= Winterthur Wallrüti railway station =

Railway station in Canton of Zürich, Switzerland

Winterthur Wallrüti
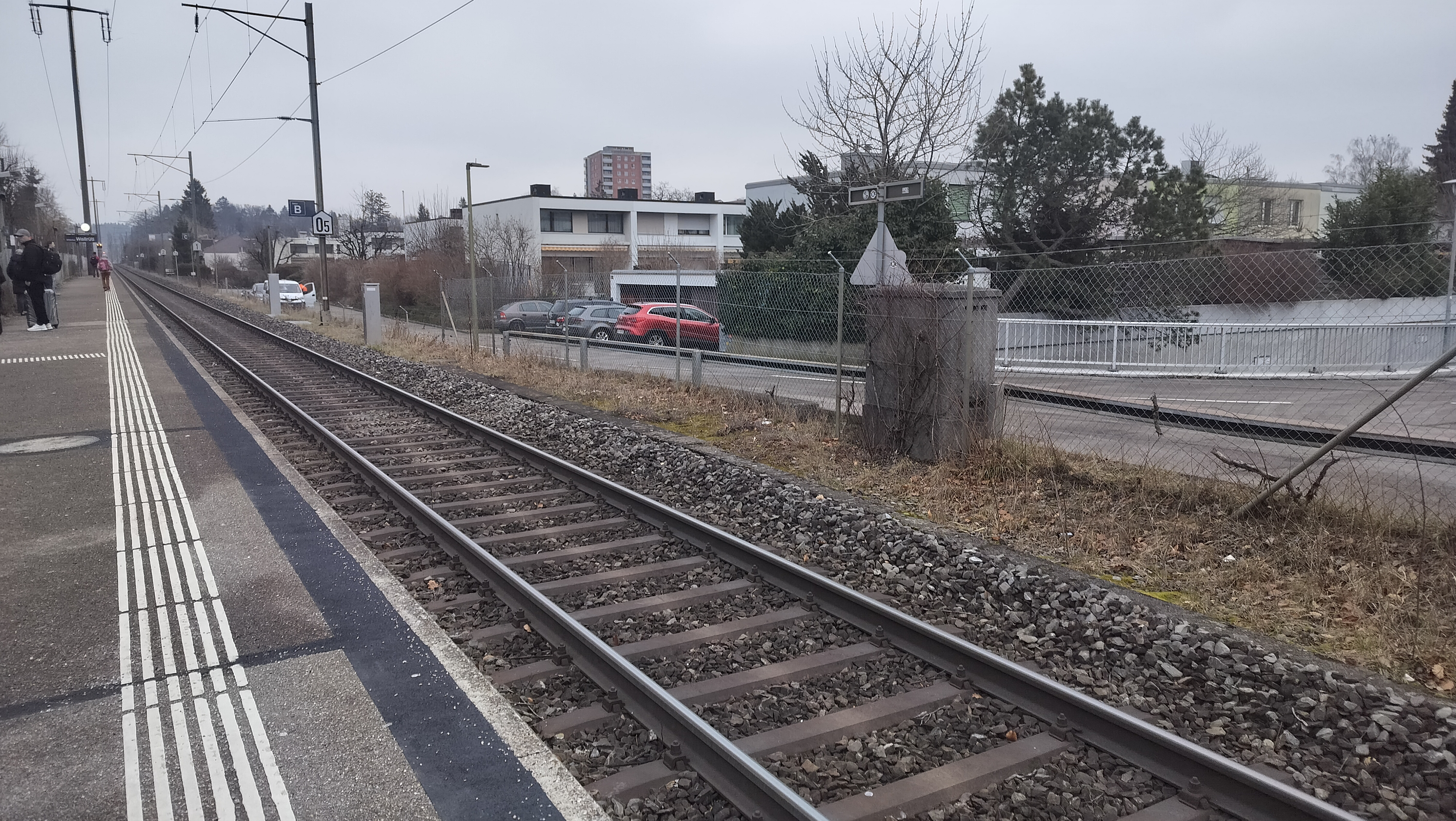
- The station in 2025

General information
- Location: Stofflerenweg; Winterthur, Zurich; Switzerland
- Coordinates: 47.516672°N 8.760969°E
- Elevation: 458 m (1,503 ft)
- Owner: Swiss Federal Railways
- Operator: Swiss Federal Railways; Thurbo
- Line: Winterthur–Etzwilen
- Platforms: 1 side platform
- Tracks: 1

Other information
- Fare zone: 120 (ZVV)

Services
Preceding station	Zurich S-Bahn	Following station
Oberwinterthur towards Aarau	S11	Reutlingen towards Seuzach
Oberwinterthur towards Winterthur	S29	Reutlingen towards Stein am Rhein
Location
- Location within Switzerland Location within Canton of Zurich

Winterthur Wallrüti railway station is a railway station in the city of Winterthur in the canton of Zurich, Switzerland. The station is on the Winterthur to Etzwilen line. It is one of ten railway stations in the city of Winterthur (fare zone 120 of ZVV), the others being: Oberwinterthur, Reutlingen, Sennhof-Kyburg, Winterthur, Winterthur Grüze, Winterthur Hegi, Winterthur Seen, Winterthur Töss, and Winterthur Wülflingen.

== Services ==
The station is an intermediate stop on Zurich S-Bahn services S11, which links Aarau and Seuzach via Zurich, and the S29, which links Winterthur and Stein am Rhein.

As of the December 2023 timetable change, the following services exist:

- Zurich S-Bahn
  - S11: hourly service to Aarau via Winterthur and Zürich HB, and to Seuzach
  - S29: half-hourly service to Winterthur and to Stein am Rhein via Etzwilen

== See also ==
- Rail transport in Switzerland
