= Dinhard railway station =

Railway station in Switzerland

Dinhard
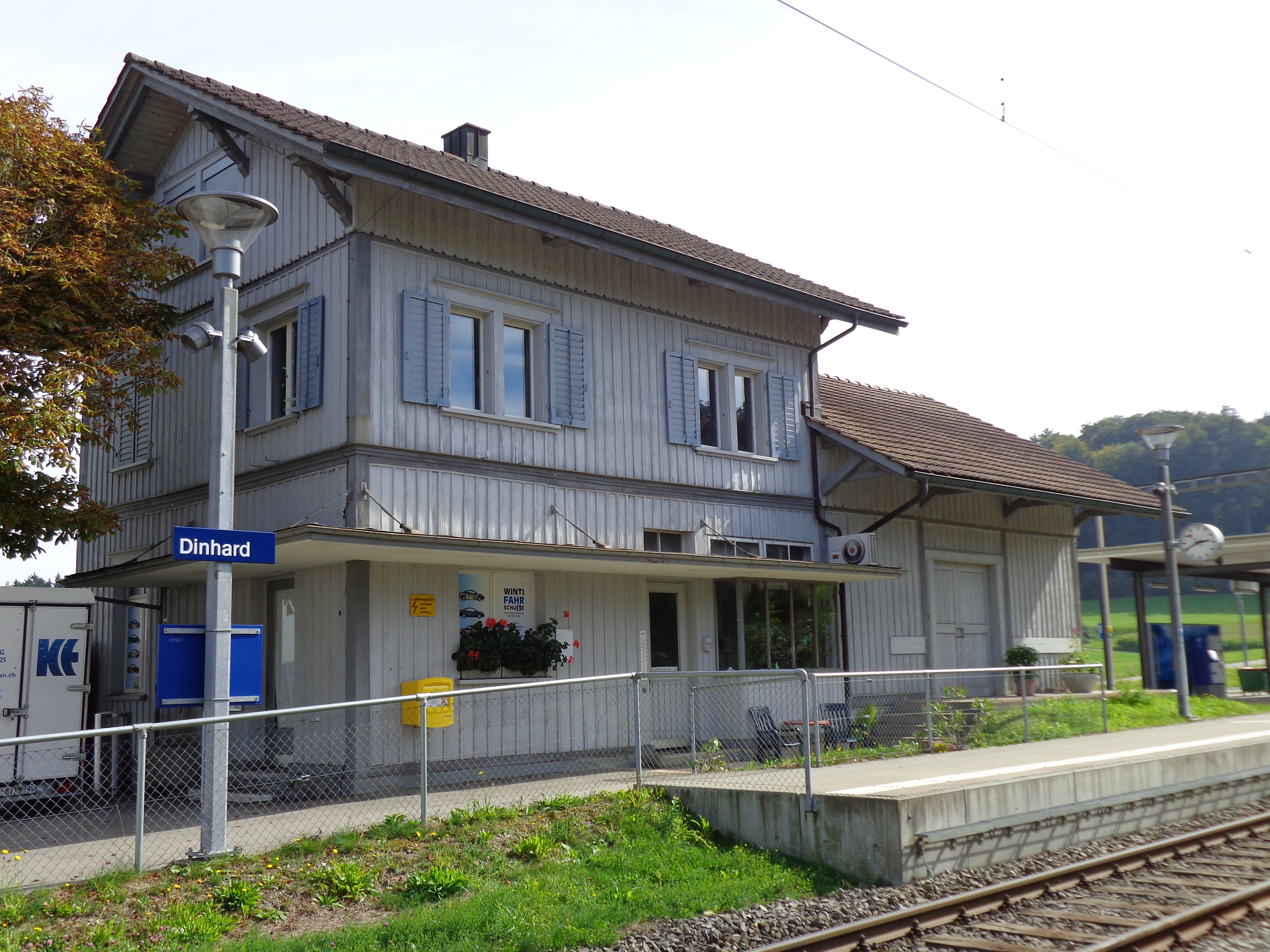

General information
- Location: Sagiweg, Dinhard, Canton of Zurich, Switzerland
- Coordinates: 47.55328°N 8.75304°E
- Elevation: 462 m (1,516 ft)
- Owner: Swiss Federal Railways
- Operator: Thurbo
- Line: Winterthur–Etzwilen
- Platforms: 1 side platform
- Tracks: 1
- Connections
- Bus: PostAuto bus line 612

Other information
- Fare zone: 160 (ZVV)

Services
Preceding station	Zurich S-Bahn	Following station
Seuzach towards Winterthur	S29	Thalheim-Altikon towards Stein am Rhein
Location
- Location within Switzerland Location within Canton of Zurich

Dinhard railway station is a railway station in the Swiss canton of Zurich and municipality of Dinhard. The station is located on the Winterthur to Etzwilen line, within fare zone 160 of Zürcher Verkehrsverbund (ZVV).

== Services ==
As of the December 2023 timetable change, the station is served by Zurich S-Bahn line S29 running between Winterthur and Stein am Rhein.

- Zurich S-Bahn S29: half-hourly service to Winterthur and to Stein am Rhein, via Etzwilen

== See also ==
- Rail transport in Switzerland
