= Thalheim-Altikon railway station =

Railway station in Thalheim an der Thur, Switzerland

Thalheim-Altikon

General information
- Location: Stationsstrasse; Thalheim an der Thur, Zurich; Switzerland
- Coordinates: 47.569418°N 8.756425°E
- Elevation: 440 m (1,440 ft)
- Owner: Swiss Federal Railways
- Operator: Thurbo
- Line: Winterthur–Etzwilen
- Connections
- Bus: PostAuto bus line 612

Other information
- Fare zone: 160 (ZVV)

Services
Preceding station	Zurich S-Bahn	Following station
Dinhard towards Winterthur	S29	Ossingen towards Stein am Rhein
Location
- Location within Switzerland Location within Canton of Zurich

Thalheim-Altikon railway station is a railway station in the Swiss canton of Zurich and municipality of Thalheim an der Thur. It takes its name from Thalheim and the adjoining municipality of Altikon. The station is located on the Winterthur to Etzwilen line, within fare zone 160 of Zürcher Verkehrsverbund (ZVV).

== Services ==
As of the December 2023 timetable change, the station is served by Zurich S-Bahn line S29 running between Winterthur and Stein am Rhein.

- Zurich S-Bahn S29: half-hourly service to Winterthur and to Stein am Rhein via Etzwilen

== See also ==
- Rail transport in Switzerland
