= Ossingen railway station =

Railway station in Ossingen, Switzerland

Ossingen
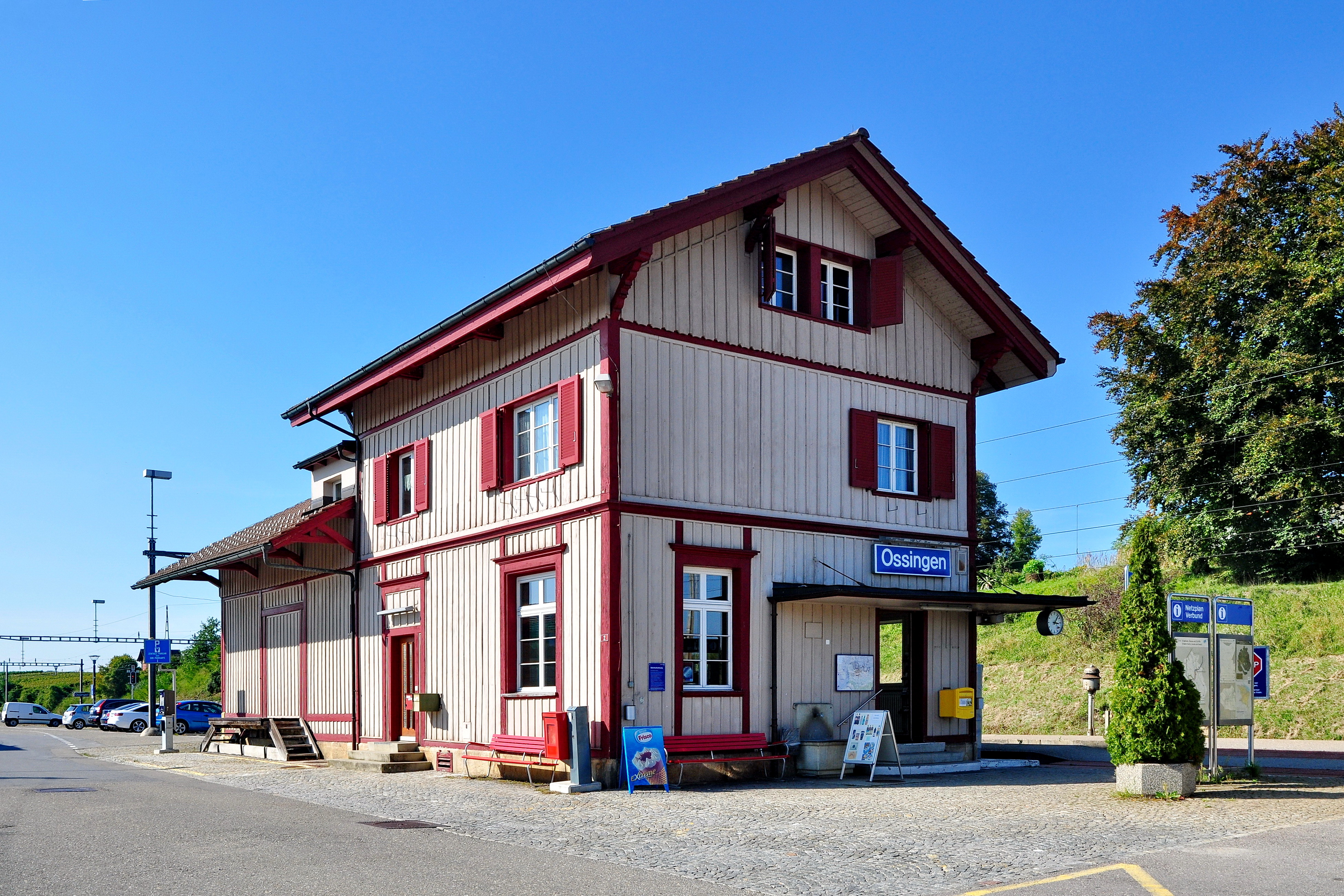

General information
- Location: Stationsstrasse, Ossingen, Canton of Zurich, Switzerland
- Coordinates: 47.614872°N 8.72426°E
- Elevation: 427 m (1,401 ft)
- Owner: Swiss Federal Railways
- Operator: Thurbo
- Line: Winterthur–Etzwilen
- Connections
- Bus: PostAuto bus lines 605 621

Other information
- Fare zone: 161 (ZVV)

Services
Preceding station	Zurich S-Bahn	Following station
Thalheim-Altikon towards Winterthur	S29	Stammheim towards Stein am Rhein
Location
- Location within Switzerland Location within Canton of Zurich

Ossingen is a railway station in the Swiss canton of Zurich and municipality of Ossingen. The station is located on the Winterthur to Etzwilen line, within fare zone 161 of the Zürcher Verkehrsverbund (ZVV).

== Services ==
As of the December 2023 timetable change, the station is served by Zurich S-Bahn line S29 running between Winterthur and Stein am Rhein.

- Zurich S-Bahn S29: half-hourly service to Winterthur and to Stein am Rhein via Etzwilen

== See also ==
- Rail transport in Switzerland
