= Wagenhausen =

- Municipality
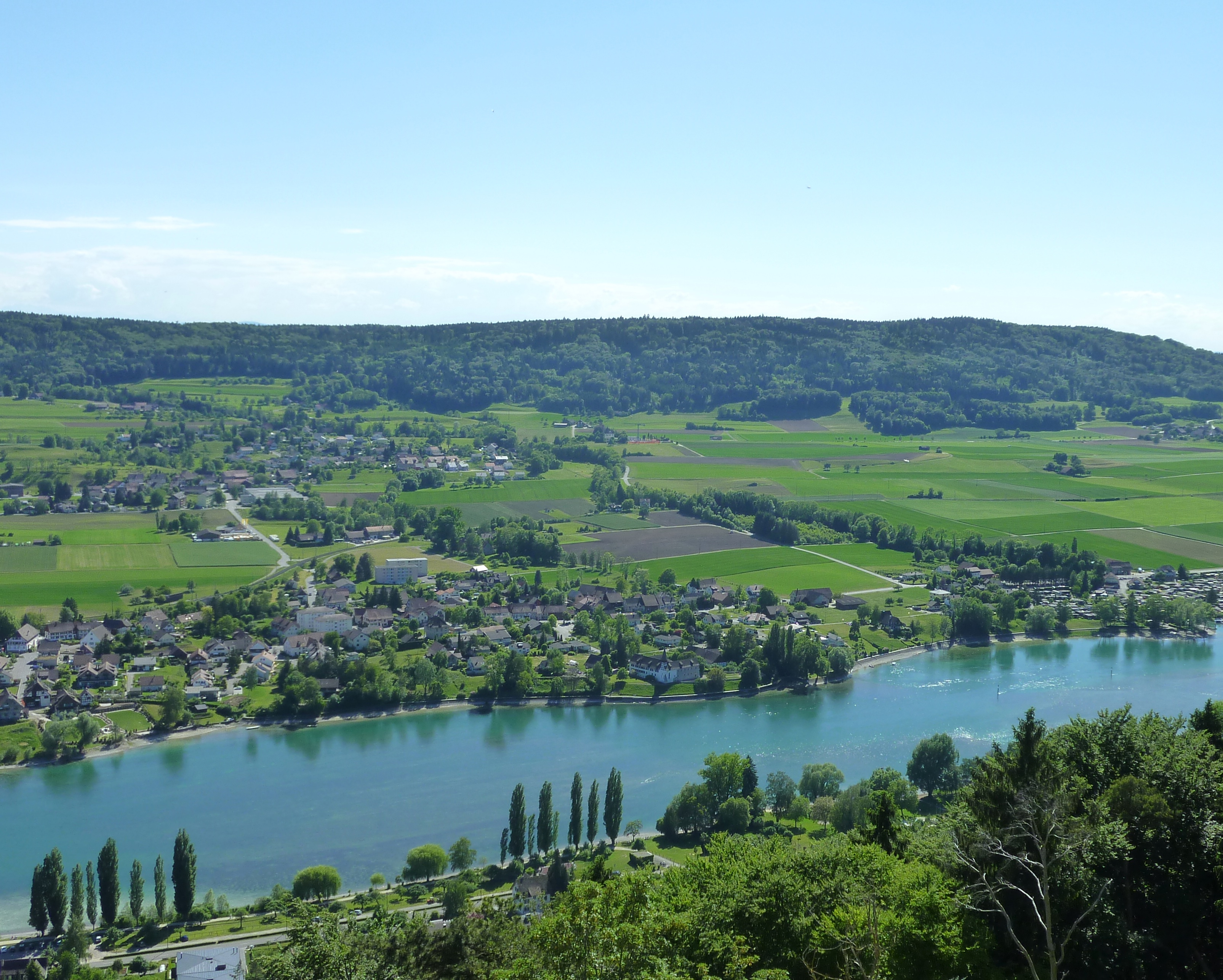

- Coat of arms
- Location of Wagenhausen
- Location within Switzerland Location within Canton of Thurgau
- Coordinates: 47°38′N 8°50′E
- Country: Switzerland
- Canton: Thurgau
- District: Frauenfeld

Area
  - Total: 11.84 km^{2} (4.57 sq mi)
- Elevation: 403 m (1,322 ft)

Population (December 2007)
  - Total: 1,589
  - Density: 134.2/km^{2} (347.6/sq mi)
- Time zone: UTC+01:00 (CET)
  - Summer (DST): UTC+02:00 (CEST)
- Postal code: 8259
- SFOS number: 4871
- ISO 3166 code: CH-TG
- Surrounded by: Diessenhofen, Eschenz, Hemishofen (SH), Hüttwilen, Oberstammheim (ZH), Ramsen (SH), Stein am Rhein (SH), Unterstammheim (ZH)
- Website: wagenhausen.ch

Wagenhausen (German pronunciation: [vaːɡn̩ˈhaʊzn̩]) is a municipality in Frauenfeld District in the canton of Thurgau in Switzerland. The municipality includes the settlements of Etzwilen, Kaltenbach and Rheinklingen.

== Geography ==
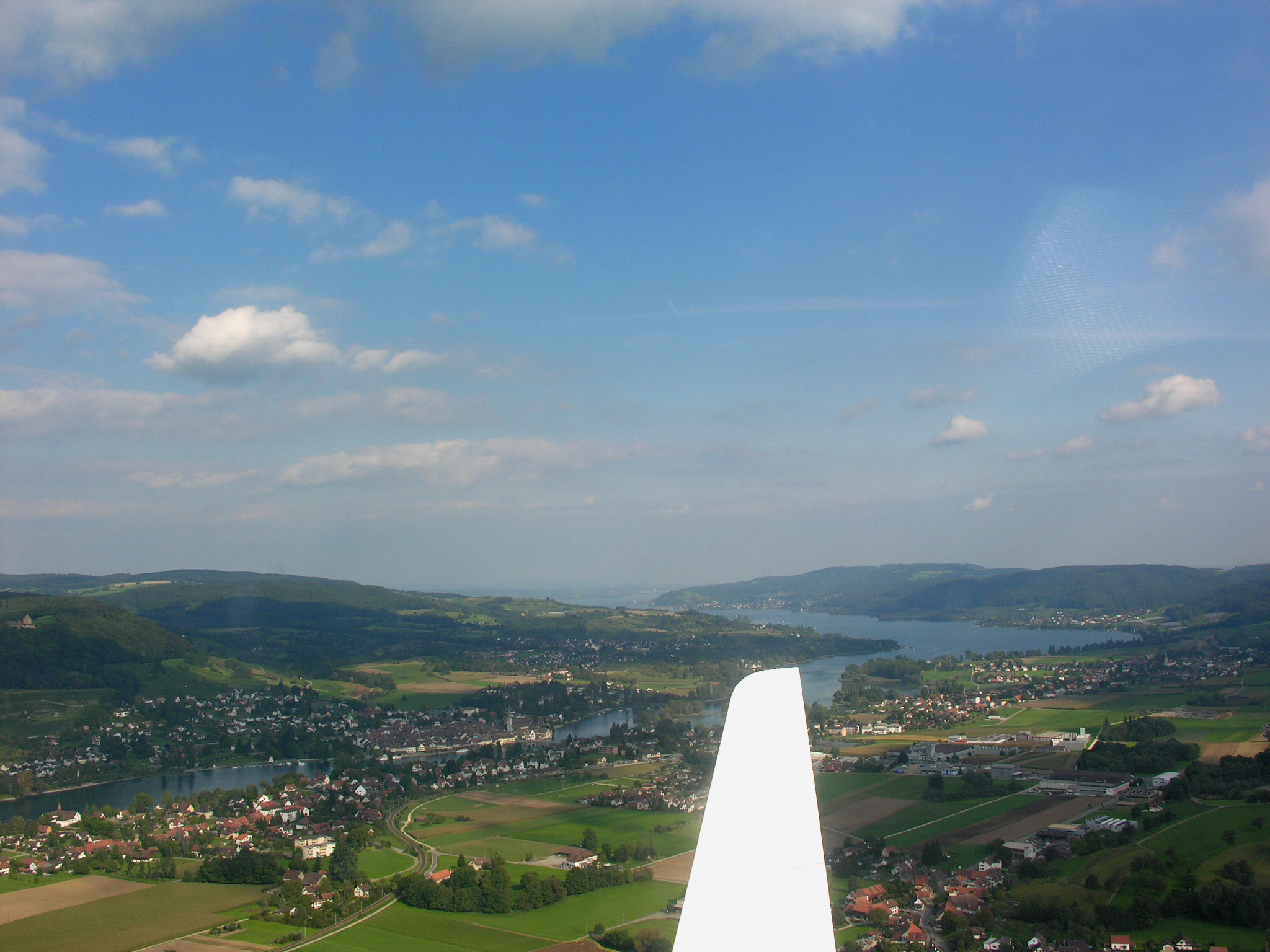
Aerial view of Wagenhausen, Stein am Rhein and Eschenz

Wagenhausen has an area, as of 2009, of 11.84 square kilometers (4.57 sq mi). Of this area, 6.36 km^{2} (2.46 sq mi) or 53.7% is used for agricultural purposes, while 3.45 km^{2} (1.33 sq mi) or 29.1% is forested. Of the rest of the land, 1.35 km^{2} (0.52 sq mi) or 11.4% is settled (buildings or roads), 0.52 km^{2} (0.20 sq mi) or 4.4% is either rivers or lakes and 0.14 km^{2} (35 acres) or 1.2% is unproductive land.

Of the built up area, industrial buildings made up 4.5% of the total area while housing and buildings made up 0.7% and transportation infrastructure made up 0.6%. Power and water infrastructure as well as other special developed areas made up 1.1% of the area while parks, green belts and sports fields made up 4.6%. Out of the forested land, 27.1% of the total land area is heavily forested and 2.0% is covered with orchards or small clusters of trees. Of the agricultural land, 51.5% is used for growing crops, while 2.2% is used for orchards or vine crops. All the water in the municipality is flowing water. Of the unproductive areas, 1.2% is unproductive vegetation.

In 1995 Rheinklingen merged into Wagenhausen.

== Demographics ==
Wagenhausen has a population (as of December 2020) of 1,770. As of 2008, 15.7% of the population are foreign nationals. Over the last 10 years (1997–2007) the population has changed at a rate of 1.4%. Most of the population (as of 2000) speaks German (91.2%), with Albanian being second most common ( 2.9%) and Turkish being third ( 1.3%).

As of 2008, the gender distribution of the population was 48.9% male and 51.1% female. The population was made up of 658 Swiss men (40.8% of the population), and 131 (8.1%) non-Swiss men. There were 702 Swiss women (43.5%), and 122 (7.6%) non-Swiss women. In 2008 there were 12 live births to Swiss citizens and 4 births to non-Swiss citizens, and in same time span there were 19 deaths of Swiss citizens and 1 non-Swiss citizen death. Ignoring immigration and emigration, the population of Swiss citizens decreased by 7 while the foreign population increased by 3. There was 1 Swiss woman who emigrated from Switzerland to another country, 8 non-Swiss men who emigrated from Switzerland to another country and 7 non-Swiss women who emigrated from Switzerland to another country. The total Swiss population change in 2008 (from all sources) was an increase of 2 and the non-Swiss population change was an increase of 13 people. This represents a population growth rate of 0.9%.

The age distribution, as of 2009, in Wagenhausen is; 154 children or 9.6% of the population are between 0 and 9 years old and 185 teenagers or 11.5% are between 10 and 19. Of the adult population, 210 people or 13.1% of the population are between 20 and 29 years old. 173 people or 10.8% are between 30 and 39, 283 people or 17.7% are between 40 and 49, and 240 people or 15.0% are between 50 and 59. The senior population distribution is 178 people or 11.1% of the population are between 60 and 69 years old, 119 people or 7.4% are between 70 and 79, there are 56 people or 3.5% who are between 80 and 89, and there are 5 people or 0.3% who are 90 and older.

As of 2000, there were 622 private households in the municipality, and an average of 2.4 persons per household. In 2000 there were 247 single family homes (or 78.9% of the total) out of a total of 313 inhabited buildings. There were 32 two family buildings (10.2%), 10 three family buildings (3.2%) and 24 multi-family buildings (or 7.7%). There were 382 (or 24.9%) persons who were part of a couple without children, and 827 (or 53.9%) who were part of a couple with children. There were 103 (or 6.7%) people who lived in single parent home, while there are 12 persons who were adult children living with one or both parents, 2 persons who lived in a household made up of relatives, 10 who lived in a household made up of unrelated persons, and 21 who are either institutionalized or live in another type of collective housing. The vacancy rate for the municipality, in 2008, was 2.53%. As of 2007, the construction rate of new housing units was 4.4 new units per 1000 residents.

In 2000 there were 720 apartments in the municipality. The most common apartment size was the 4 room apartment of which there were 255. There were 9 single room apartments and 128 apartments with six or more rooms. As of 2000 the average price to rent an average apartment in Wagenhausen was 971.40 Swiss francs (CHF) per month (US$780, £440, €620 approx. exchange rate from 2000). The average rate for a one-room apartment was 585.83 CHF (US$470, £260, €370), a two-room apartment was about 668.20 CHF (US$530, £300, €430), a three-room apartment was about 860.57 CHF (US$690, £390, €550) and a six or more room apartment cost an average of 1555.00 CHF (US$1240, £700, €1000). The average apartment price in Wagenhausen was 87.0% of the national average of 1116 CHF.

In the 2007 federal election the most popular party was the SVP which received 49.66% of the vote. The next three most popular parties were the FDP (12.57%), the Green Party (12.38%) and the SP (11.76%). In the federal election, a total of 540 votes were cast, and the voter turnout was 48.3%.

The historical population is given in the following table:

year	population
1850	1,308
1860	1,207
1870	1,187
1880	1,096
1890	1,073
1900	1,052
1950	1,104
1960	1,107
1980	1,327
1990	1,418
2000	1,533

== Heritage sites of national significance ==
The former Benedictine priory and mill at Propstei 10, 12 and the former Propstei-Trotte at Propstei 4 are listed as Swiss heritage sites of national significance. The village of Rheinklingen is designated as part of the Inventory of Swiss Heritage Sites.

== Economy ==
As of 2007, Wagenhausen had an unemployment rate of 2.04%. As of 2005, there were 73 people employed in the primary economic sector and about 27 businesses involved in this sector. 195 people are employed in the secondary sector and there are 22 businesses in this sector. 149 people are employed in the tertiary sector, with 47 businesses in this sector. In 2000 there were 1,027 workers who lived in the municipality. Of these, 559 or about 54.4% of the residents worked outside Wagenhausen while 224 people commuted into the municipality for work. There were a total of 692 jobs (of at least 6 hours per week) in the municipality. Of the working population, 12.1% used public transportation to get to work, and 48.5% used a private car.

== Religion ==
From the 2000 census, 273 or 17.8% were Roman Catholic, while 862 or 56.2% belonged to the Swiss Reformed Church. Of the rest of the population, there are 36 individuals (or about 2.35% of the population) who belong to the Orthodox Church, and there are 52 individuals (or about 3.39% of the population) who belong to another Christian church. There were 80 (or about 5.22% of the population) who are Islamic. There are 3 individuals (or about 0.20% of the population) who belong to another church (not listed on the census), 153 (or about 9.98% of the population) belong to no church, are agnostic or atheist, and 74 individuals (or about 4.83% of the population) did not answer the question.

== Transport ==
Wagenhausen has a railway station near Etzwilen of that same name. Etzwilen is the junction station of the Lake Line between Schaffhausen and Rorschach, the Winterthur–Etzwilen railway to Winterthur and the Etzwilen–Singen railway to Singen (Hohentwiel), which is a heritage railway since 2007. Etzwilen station is served by the S1 of St. Gallen S-Bahn (request stop) and the S29 of Zürich S-Bahn.

== Education ==
In Wagenhausen about 70.9% of the population (between age 25–64) have completed either non-mandatory upper secondary education or additional higher education (either university or a Fachhochschule).

Wagenhausen is part of the Wagenhausen-Kaltenbach primary school district. In the 2008/2009 school year there are 128 students. There are 26 children in the kindergarten, and the average class size is 13 kindergartners. Of the children in kindergarten, 16 or 61.5% are female, 5 or 19.2% are not Swiss citizens and 4 or 15.4% do not speak German natively. The lower and upper primary levels begin at about age 5-6 and lasts for 6 years. There are 54 children in who are at the lower primary level and 48 children in the upper primary level. The average class size in the primary school is 20.4 students. At the lower primary level, there are 29 children or 53.7% of the total population who are female, 14 or 25.9% are not Swiss citizens and 11 or 20.4% do not speak German natively. In the upper primary level, there are 29 or 60.4% who are female, 12 or 25.0% are not Swiss citizens and 12 or 25.0% do not speak German natively.
