= Langwiesen railway station =

Railway station in Switzerland

Langwiesen
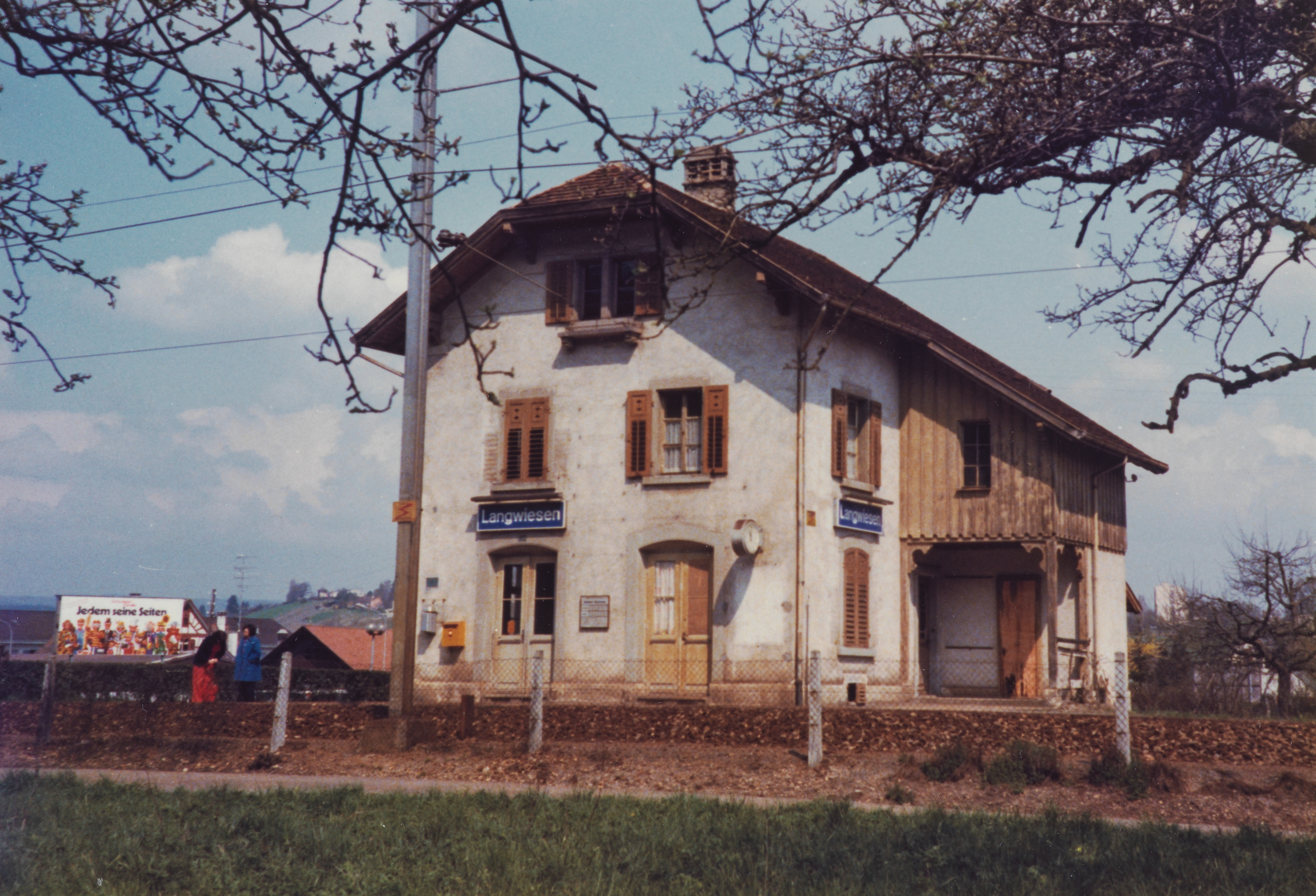
- The former station building in 1978

General information
- Location: Feuerthalen; Switzerland
- Coordinates: 47°41′22″N 8°39′36″E
- Elevation: 409 m (1,342 ft)
- Owner: Swiss Federal Railways
- Line: Lake Line
- Platforms: 1 side platform
- Tracks: 1
- Train operators: Thurbo

Other information
- Fare zone: 820 (Tarifverbund Ostwind)

Services
Preceding station	St. Gallen S-Bahn	Following station
Feuerthalen towards Schaffhausen	S1	Schlatt towards Wil
Preceding station	Zurich S-Bahn	Following station
Feuerthalen towards Winterthur	SN3 Limited service	Schlatt towards Stein am Rhein
Location
- Location within Switzerland Location within Canton of Zurich

Langwiesen railway station (German: Bahnhof Langwiesen) is a railway station in Langwiesen, part of the municipality of Feuerthalen, in the Swiss canton of Zurich. It is an intermediate stop on the Lake Line and is served as a request stop by local trains only.

== Services ==
Langwiesen is served by the S1 of the St. Gallen S-Bahn:

- S1: half-hourly service between Schaffhausen and Wil SG via St. Gallen.

During weekends, there is also a Zurich S-Bahn nighttime service (SN3) offered by ZVV.

- SN3: hourly service to Winterthur (via Schaffhausen) and Stein am Rhein.

== See also ==
- Rail transport in Switzerland
