= Schlatt railway station =

Railway station in Switzerland

Schlatt
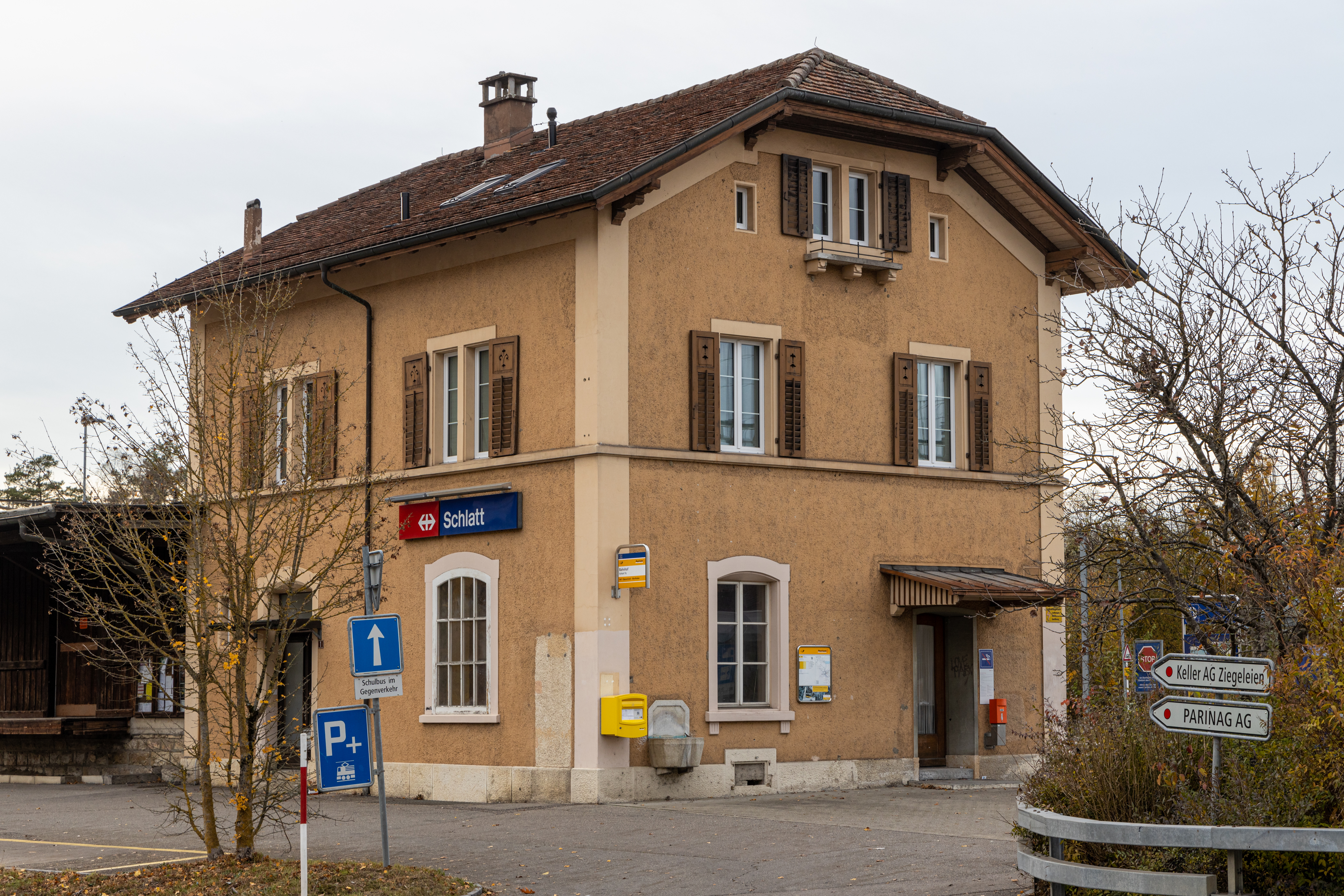

General information
- Location: Schlatt; Switzerland
- Coordinates: 47°41′9″N 8°41′9″E
- Elevation: 404 m (1,325 ft)
- Owner: Swiss Federal Railways
- Line: Lake line
- Train operators: Thurbo
- Connections: Tarifverbund Ostwind
- Bus: PostAuto line 848

Other information
- Fare zone: 820 (Tarifverbund Ostwind)

Services
Preceding station	St. Gallen S-Bahn	Following station
Langwiesen towards Schaffhausen	S1	St. Katharinental towards Wil
Preceding station	Zurich S-Bahn	Following station
Langwiesen towards Winterthur	SN3 Limited service	St. Katharinental towards Stein am Rhein
Location
- Location within Switzerland Location within Canton of Thurgau

Schlatt railway station (German: Bahnhof Schlatt) is a railway station in Schlatt, in the Swiss canton of Thurgau. It is an intermediate stop on the Lake line and is served as a request stop by local trains only.

== Services ==
Schlatt is served by the S1 of the St. Gallen S-Bahn:

- S1: half-hourly service between Schaffhausen and Wil SG via St. Gallen.

During weekends, there is also a Zurich S-Bahn nighttime service (SN3) offered by ZVV.

- SN3: hourly service to Winterthur (via Schaffhausen) and Stein am Rhein.

The station is also served by a PostAuto bus line.

== See also ==
- Rail transport in Switzerland
