= Thalheim an der Thur =

- Municipality
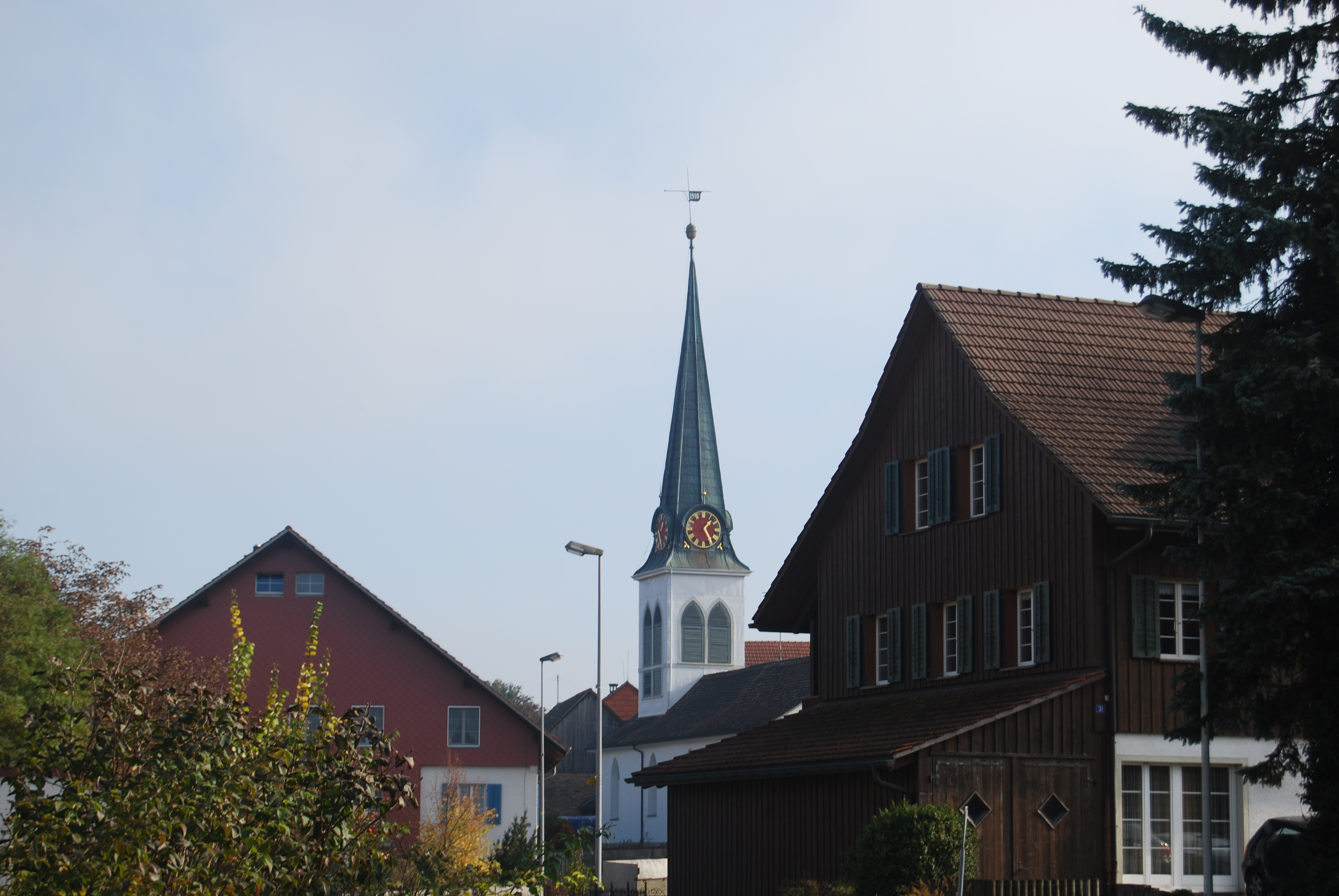

- Flag Coat of arms
- Location of Thalheim an der Thur
- Location within Switzerland Location within Canton of Zurich
- Coordinates: 47°35′N 8°45′E
- Country: Switzerland
- Canton: Zurich
- District: Andelfingen (district)

Government
  - Mayor: Gemeindepräsident; Peter Wettstein Ind. (as of 2008)

Area
  - Total: 6.44 km^{2} (2.49 sq mi)
- Elevation: 385 m (1,263 ft)

Population (December 2020)
  - Total: 949
  - Density: 147/km^{2} (382/sq mi)
- Time zone: UTC+01:00 (CET)
  - Summer (DST): UTC+02:00 (CEST)
- Postal code: 8478
- SFOS number: 39
- ISO 3166 code: CH-ZH
- Surrounded by: Adlikon, Altikon, Dägerlen, Dinhard, Neunforn (TG), Ossingen
- Website: www.thalheim.ch

Thalheim an der Thur is a municipality in the district of Andelfingen in the canton of Zürich in Switzerland.

== History ==
Thalheim an der Thur is first mentioned in 1166 as Torlinchovin. In 1257 it was mentioned as Torlinkon. Until 1878 it was Dorlikon. The name may have originated from the Alamanni name Torilo which originated in the 7th century. However, as this name could easily be taken to mean "Fools' Village" (from the nowadays old-fashioned expression Tor, German for "fool"), the community was granted a name change to Thalheim an der Thur in 1878. The original name is still used in the area.

Aerial view (1958)

== Geography ==
Thalheim an der Thur has an area of 6.4 km^{2} (2.5 sq mi). Of this area, 65.7% is used for agricultural purposes, while 21.9% is forested. Of the rest of the land, 9% is settled (buildings or roads) and the remainder (3.4%) is non-productive (rivers, glaciers or mountains).

The municipality, in contrast to its name, does not lie on the Thur river, but rather to the south. In 1862, the first bridge was built over the Thur. 14 years later, it was ruined by a flood and was rebuilt three years later. In 1875, the Winterthur–Etzwilen railway line was opened bringing the connection with the outside world.

== Demographics ==
Thalheim an der Thur has a population (as of 31 December 2020) of 949. As of 2007, 5.8% of the population was made up of foreign nationals. Over the last 10 years the population has grown at a rate of 23.3%. Most of the population (as of 2000) speaks German (93.1%), with Portuguese being second most common ( 2.0%) and Albanian being third ( 1.3%).

In the 2007 election the most popular party was the SVP which received 57% of the vote. The next three most popular parties were the FDP (9.9%), the CSP (9.1%) and the SPS (8.6%).

The age distribution of the population (as of 2000) is children and teenagers (0–19 years old) make up 23.5% of the population, while adults (20–64 years old) make up 65.9% and seniors (over 64 years old) make up 10.5%. In Thalheim an der Thur about 79.8% of the population (between age 25–64) have completed either non-mandatory upper secondary education or additional higher education (either university or a Fachhochschule).

Thalheim an der Thur has an unemployment rate of 1.91%. As of 2005, there were 75 people employed in the primary economic sector and about 20 businesses involved in this sector. 29 people are employed in the secondary sector and there are 8 businesses in this sector. 42 people are employed in the tertiary sector, with 13 businesses in this sector. The historical population is given in the following table:

year	population
1637	289
1707	480
1799	442
1850	561
1900	469
1950	433
2000	637

== Transport ==
Thalheim-Altikon railway station is served by Zurich S-Bahn line S29, which links Winterthur and Stein am Rhein.
