= Diessenhofen railway station =

Railway station in Switzerland

Diessenhofen
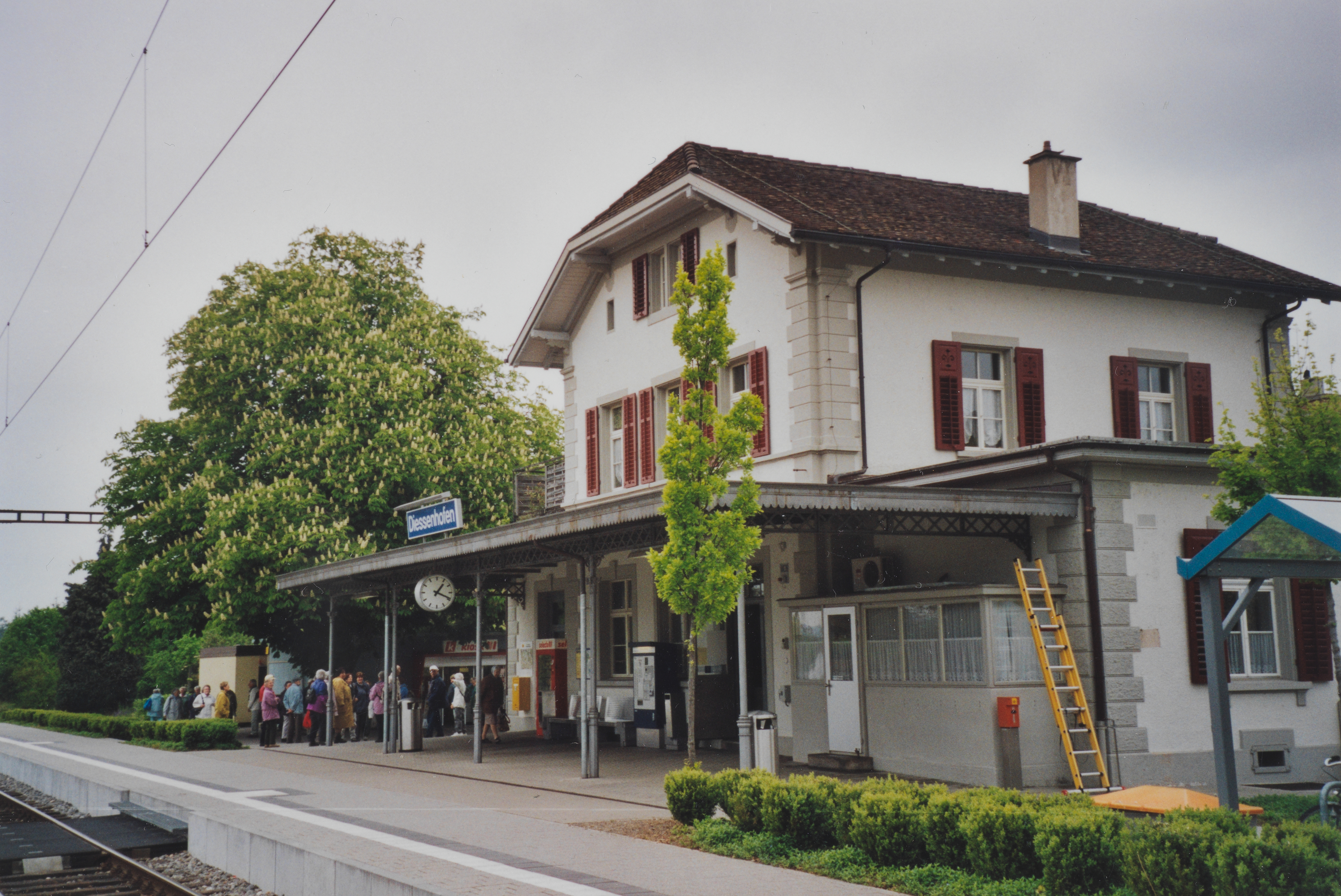

General information
- Location: Diessenhofen; Switzerland
- Coordinates: 47°41′28″N 8°45′13″E
- Elevation: 413 m (1,355 ft)
- Owner: Swiss Federal Railways
- Line: Lake Line
- Train operators: Thurbo
- Connections: Tarifverbund Ostwind
- Bus: PostAuto lines 823 847 848

Other information
- Fare zone: 835 (Tarifverbund Ostwind)

Services
Preceding station	St. Gallen S-Bahn	Following station
St. Katharinental towards Schaffhausen	S1	Schlattingen towards Wil
Preceding station	Zurich S-Bahn	Following station
St. Katharinental towards Winterthur	SN3 Limited service	Schlattingen towards Stein am Rhein
Location
- Location within Switzerland Location within Canton of Thurgau

Diessenhofen railway station (German: Bahnhof Diessenhofen) is a railway station in Diessenhofen, in the Swiss canton of Thurgau. It is an intermediate stop on the Lake Line and is served by local trains only.

== Services ==
Diessenhofen is served by the S1 of the St. Gallen S-Bahn:

- S1: half-hourly service between Schaffhausen and Wil SG via St. Gallen.

During weekends, there is also a Zurich S-Bahn nighttime service (SN3) offered by ZVV.

- SN3: hourly service to Winterthur (via Schaffhausen) and Stein am Rhein.

The station is additionally served by PostAuto buses.

== See also ==
- Rail transport in Switzerland
