= Schlattingen railway station =

Railway station in Switzerland

Schlattingen
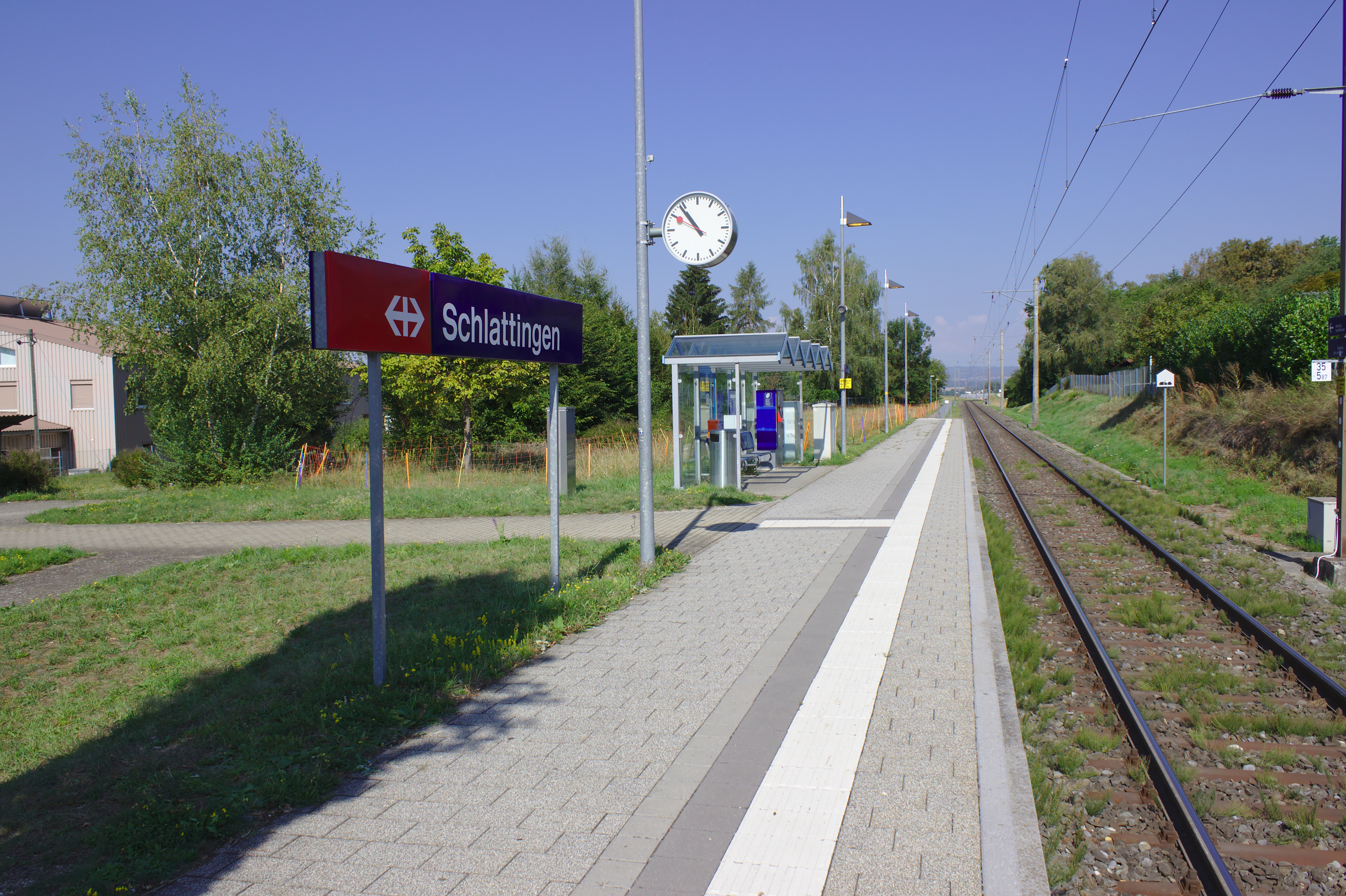
- The platform at Schlattingen in 2018

General information
- Location: Schlattingen; Switzerland
- Coordinates: 47°39′39″N 8°45′50″E
- Elevation: 427 m (1,401 ft)
- Owner: Swiss Federal Railways
- Line: Lake Line
- Platforms: 1 side platform
- Tracks: 1
- Train operators: Thurbo

Other information
- Fare zone: 835 (Tarifverbund Ostwind)

Services
Preceding station	St. Gallen S-Bahn	Following station
Diessenhofen towards Schaffhausen	S1	Etzwilen towards Wil
Preceding station	Zurich S-Bahn	Following station
Diessenhofen towards Winterthur	SN3 Limited service	Etzwilen towards Stein am Rhein
Location
- Location within Switzerland Location within Canton of Thurgau

Schlattingen railway station (German: Bahnhof Schlattingen) is a railway station in Schlattingen, in the Swiss canton of Thurgau. It is an intermediate stop on the Lake line and is served as a request stop by local trains only.

== Services ==
Schlattingen is served by the S1 of the St. Gallen S-Bahn:

- S1: half-hourly service between Schaffhausen and Wil SG via St. Gallen.

During weekends, there is also a Zurich S-Bahn nighttime service (SN3) offered by ZVV.

- SN3: hourly service to Winterthur (via Schaffhausen) and Stein am Rhein.

== See also ==
- Rail transport in Switzerland
