= Stammheim railway station =

Railway station in Stammheim, Switzerland

Stammheim
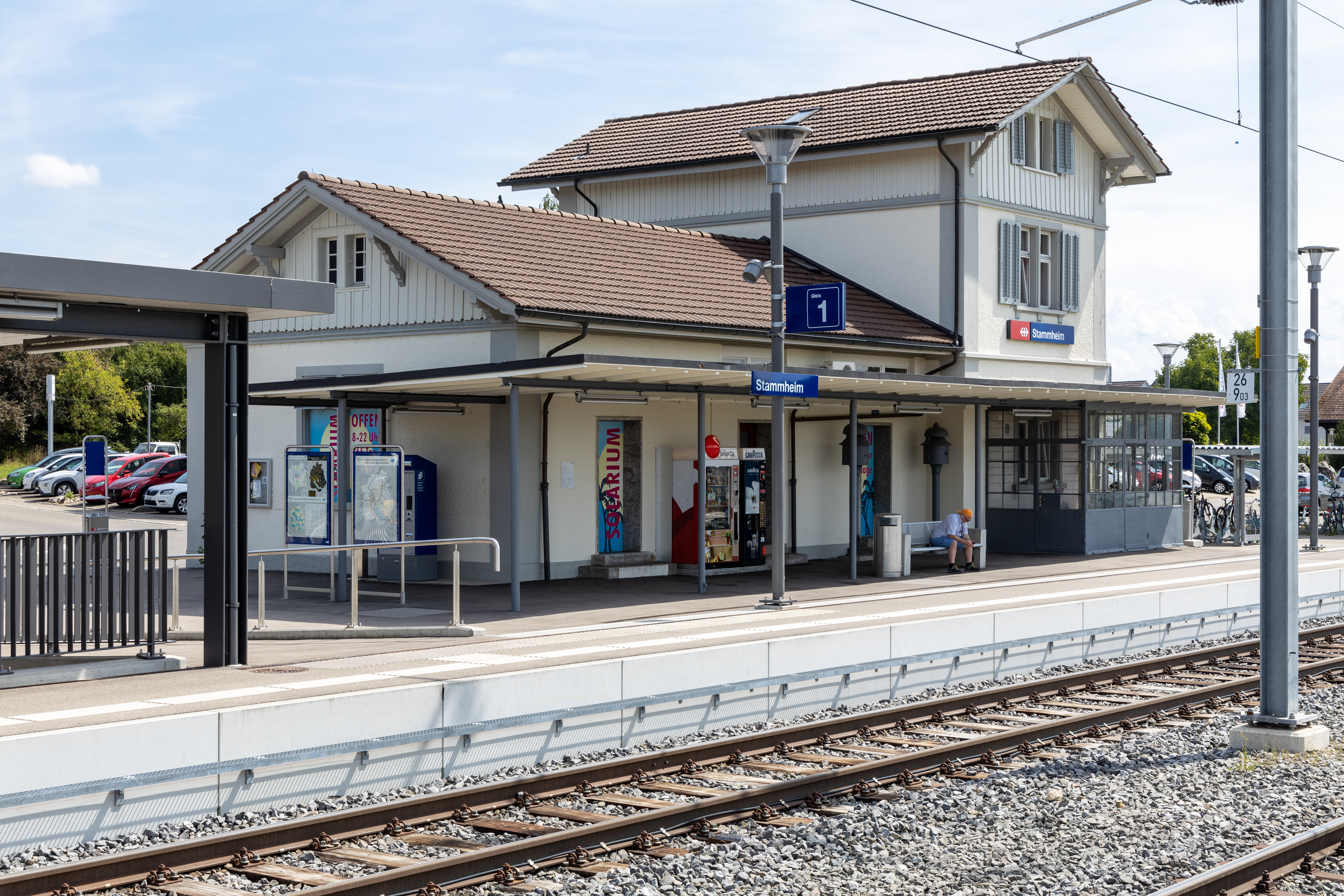

General information
- Location: Bahnhofstrasse, Unterstammheim, Canton of Zurich; Switzerland
- Coordinates: 47.634974°N 8.788719°E
- Elevation: 433 m (1,421 ft)
- Owner: Swiss Federal Railways
- Operator: Thurbo
- Line: Winterthur–Etzwilen
- Platforms: 2 side platforms
- Tracks: 2
- Connections
- Bus: PostAuto bus lines 605 823

Other information
- Fare zone: 162 (ZVV); 959 (Tarifverbund Ostschweiz)

History
- Opened: 1875

Services
Preceding station	Zurich S-Bahn	Following station
Ossingen towards Winterthur	S29	Etzwilen towards Stein am Rhein
Location
- Location within Switzerland Location within Canton of Zurich

Stammheim is a railway station in the Swiss canton of Zurich and municipality of Unterstammheim. The station is located on the Winterthur to Etzwilen line. It lies within both fare zone 162 of the Zürcher Verkehrsverbund (ZVV), and fare zone 959 of the Ostwind fare network.

== Services ==
As of the December 2023 timetable change, the station is served by Zurich S-Bahn line S29 running between Winterthur and Stein am Rhein.

- Zurich S-Bahn S29: half-hourly service to Winterthur and to Stein am Rhein, via Etzwilen

== See also ==
- Rail transport in Switzerland
