= Seuzach railway station =

Railway station in Seuzach, Switzerland

Seuzach
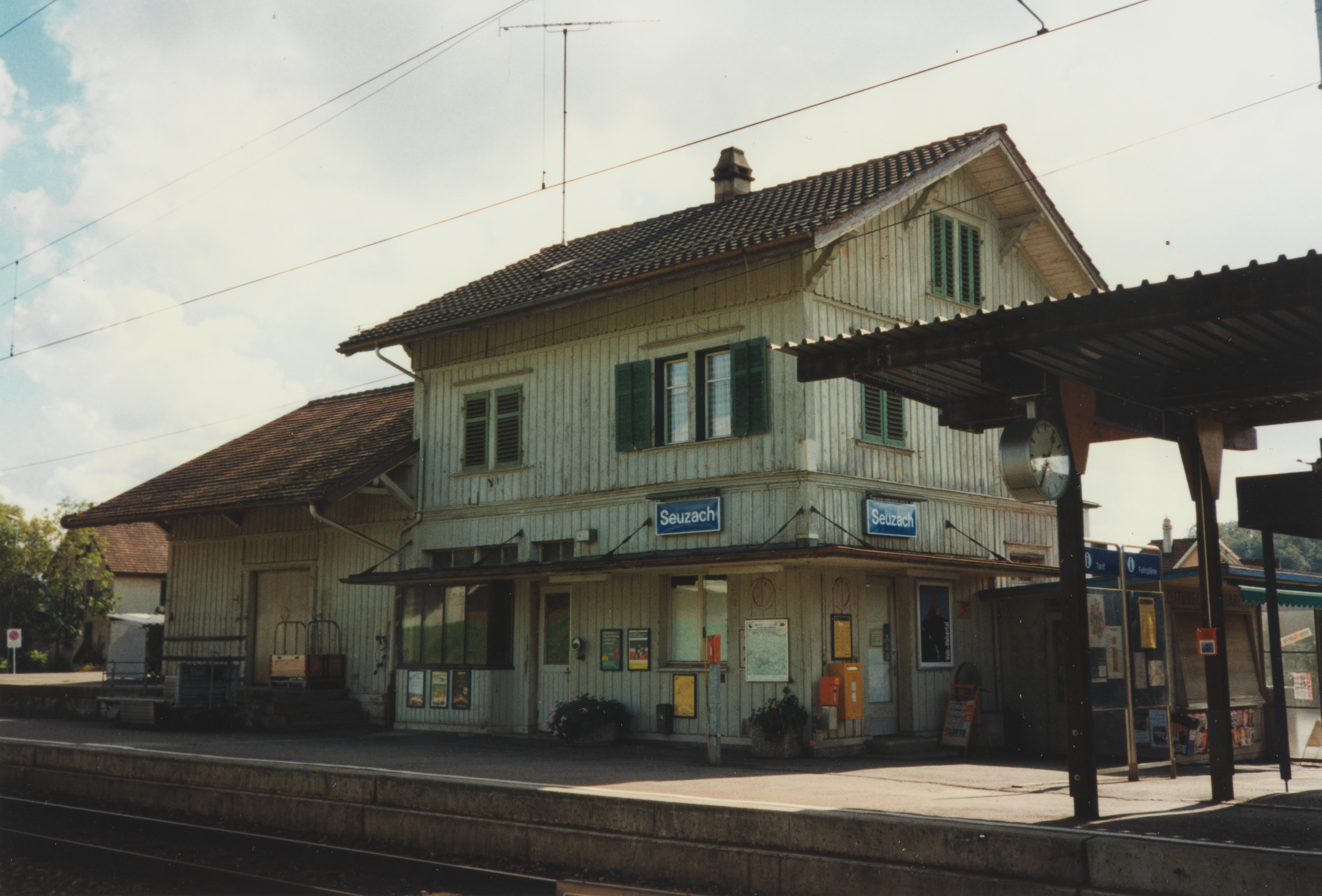
- Station in 1995

General information
- Location: Stationsstrasse; Seuzach, Zurich; Switzerland
- Coordinates: 47.535591°N 8.738964°E
- Elevation: 455 m (1,493 ft)
- Owner: Swiss Federal Railways
- Operator: Swiss Federal Railways; Thurbo
- Line: Winterthur–Etzwilen
- Platforms: 2 side platforms
- Tracks: 2
- Connections
- Bus: Stadtbus Winterthur bus route 674; PostAuto bus lines 612 679

Other information
- Fare zone: 160 (ZVV)

Services
| Preceding station | Zurich S-Bahn | Following station |
|---|---|---|
| Reutlingen towards Aarau | S11 | Terminus |
| Reutlingen towards Winterthur | S29 | Dinhard towards Stein am Rhein |
Location
- Location within Switzerland Location within Canton of Zurich

Seuzach railway station is a railway station in the Swiss canton of Zurich and municipality of Seuzach. The station is located on the Winterthur to Etzwilen line, within fare zone 160 of Zürcher Verkehrsverbund (ZVV).

== Services ==
The station is only served by S-Bahn trains. It is the terminus of Zurich S-Bahn service S11 from Aarau, via Zurich, and is an intermediate stop on the Zurich S-Bahn service S29, which links Winterthur and Stein am Rhein.

As of the December 2023 timetable change, the following services exist:

- Zurich S-Bahn
  - S11: hourly service to Aarau via Winterthur and Zürich HB
  - S29: half-hourly service to Winterthur and to Stein am Rhein via Etzwilen

== See also ==
- Rail transport in Switzerland
