= St. Katharinental railway station =

Railway station in Switzerland

St. Katharinental

General information
- Location: Diessenhofen; Switzerland
- Coordinates: 47°41′35″N 8°43′48″E
- Elevation: 413 m (1,355 ft)
- Owner: Swiss Federal Railways
- Line: Lake Line
- Platforms: 1 side platform
- Tracks: 1
- Train operators: Thurbo

Other information
- Fare zone: 835 (Tarifverbund Ostwind)

Services
Preceding station	St. Gallen S-Bahn	Following station
Schlatt towards Schaffhausen	S1	Diessenhofen towards Wil
Preceding station	Zurich S-Bahn	Following station
Schlatt towards Winterthur	SN3 Limited service	Diessenhofen towards Stein am Rhein
Location
- Location within Switzerland Location within Canton of Thurgau

St. Katharinental railway station (German: Bahnhof St. Katharinental) is a railway station in Diessenhofen, in the Swiss canton of Thurgau. It is an intermediate stop on the Lake Line and is served as a request stop by local trains only. It takes its name from the former Dominican monastery of St. Katharinental, located 650 metres (2,130 ft) north of the station.

== Services ==
St. Katharinental is served by the S1 of the St. Gallen S-Bahn:

- S1: half-hourly service between Schaffhausen and Wil SG via St. Gallen.

During weekends, there is also a Zurich S-Bahn nighttime service (SN3) offered by ZVV.

- SN3: hourly service to Winterthur (via Schaffhausen) and Stein am Rhein.

== See also ==
- Rail transport in Switzerland
