= Altikon =

- Municipality
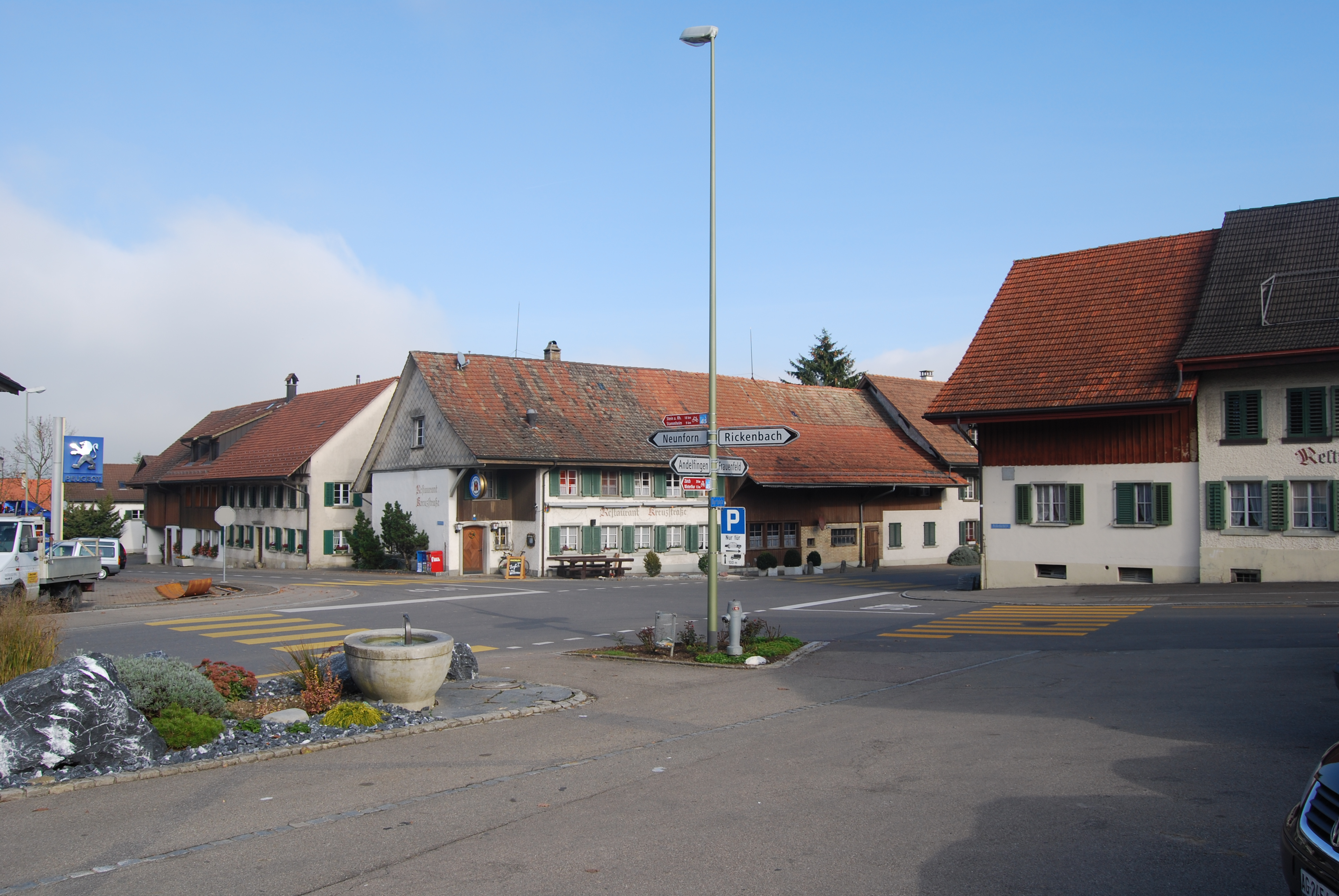

- Flag Coat of arms
- Location of Altikon
- Location within Switzerland Location within Canton of Zurich
- Coordinates: 47°34′N 8°47′E
- Country: Switzerland
- Canton: Zurich
- District: Winterthur

Area
  - Total: 7.68 km^{2} (2.97 sq mi)
- Elevation: 393 m (1,289 ft)

Population (December 2020)
  - Total: 701
  - Density: 91.3/km^{2} (236/sq mi)
- Time zone: UTC+01:00 (CET)
  - Summer (DST): UTC+02:00 (CEST)
- Postal code: 8321
- SFOS number: 211
- ISO 3166 code: CH-ZH
- Surrounded by: Dinhard, Ellikon an der Thur, Neunforn (TG), Rickenbach, Thalheim an der Thur, Uesslingen-Buch (TG)
- Website: www.altikon.ch

Altikon is a municipality in the district of Winterthur in the canton of Zürich in Switzerland.

== History ==
Altikon is first mentioned in 1277 as Altlincon.

== Geography ==
Aerial view from 400 m by Walter Mittelholzer (1923)

Altikon has an area of 7.7 km^{2} (3.0 sq mi). Of this area, 68.6% is used for agricultural purposes, while 20.3% is forested. Of the rest of the land, 6.5% is settled (buildings or roads) and the remainder (4.6%) is non-productive (rivers, glaciers or mountains). In 1996 housing and buildings made up 3.5% of the total area, while transportation infrastructure made up the rest (3%). Of the total unproductive area, water (streams and lakes) made up 2.6% of the area. As of 2007 2.6% of the total municipal area was undergoing some type of construction.

The village of Altikon is located on the southern bank of the Thur river. It is at the intersection of the old Thurtalstrasse (parallel to the Thur river) from Andelfingen to Frauenfeld and the main north-south road over the Thru. The municipality includes the village of Altikon and the hamlet of Schneit. Since 1884 it has also included Feldi and Herten (Burgstelle), which were part of Ellikon an der Thur.

== Demographics ==
Altikon has a population (as of 31 December 2020) of 701. As of 2007, 4.0% of the population was made up of foreign nationals. As of 2008 the gender distribution of the population was 51.2% male and 48.8% female. Over the last 10 years the population has grown at a rate of 3.5%. Most of the population (as of 2000) speaks German (98.4%), with English being second most common (0.3%) and Spanish being third (0.3%).

In the 2007 election the most popular party was the SVP which received 62.8% of the vote. The next three most popular parties were the SPS (11.8%), the Green Party (7.8%) and the CSP (6.4%).

The age distribution of the population (as of 2000) is children and teenagers (0–19 years old) make up 28.9% of the population, while adults (20–64 years old) make up 59.1% and seniors (over 64 years old) make up 12.1%. In Altikon about 77.9% of the population (between age 25-64) have completed either non-mandatory upper secondary education or additional higher education (either university or a Fachhochschule). There are 230 households in Altikon.

Altikon has an unemployment rate of 0.65%. As of 2005, there were 101 people employed in the primary economic sector and about 35 businesses involved in this sector. 11 people are employed in the secondary sector and there are 4 businesses in this sector. 33 people are employed in the tertiary sector, with 17 businesses in this sector. As of 2007 37% of the working population were employed full-time, and 63% were employed part-time.

As of 2008 there were 85 Catholics and 439 Protestants in Altikon. In the 2000 census, religion was broken down into several smaller categories. From the census, 75.7% were some type of Protestant, with 74.2% belonging to the Swiss Reformed Church and 1.5% belonging to other Protestant churches. 12.6% of the population were Catholic. Of the rest of the population, 0% were Muslim, 1.1% belonged to another religion (not listed), 2.8% did not give a religion, and 7.5% were atheist or agnostic.

The historical population is given in the following table:

| year | population |
|---|---|
| 1467 | 62 (in 20 households) |
| 1836 | 400 |
| 1850 | 452 |
| 1950 | 471 |
| 2000 | 613 |

== Transport ==
Thalheim-Altikon railway station, in the neighbouring municipality of Thalheim an der Thur, is served by Zurich S-Bahn line S29, which links Winterthur and Stein am Rhein.
