= Feuerthalen railway station =

Train station in Switzerland

Feuerthalen
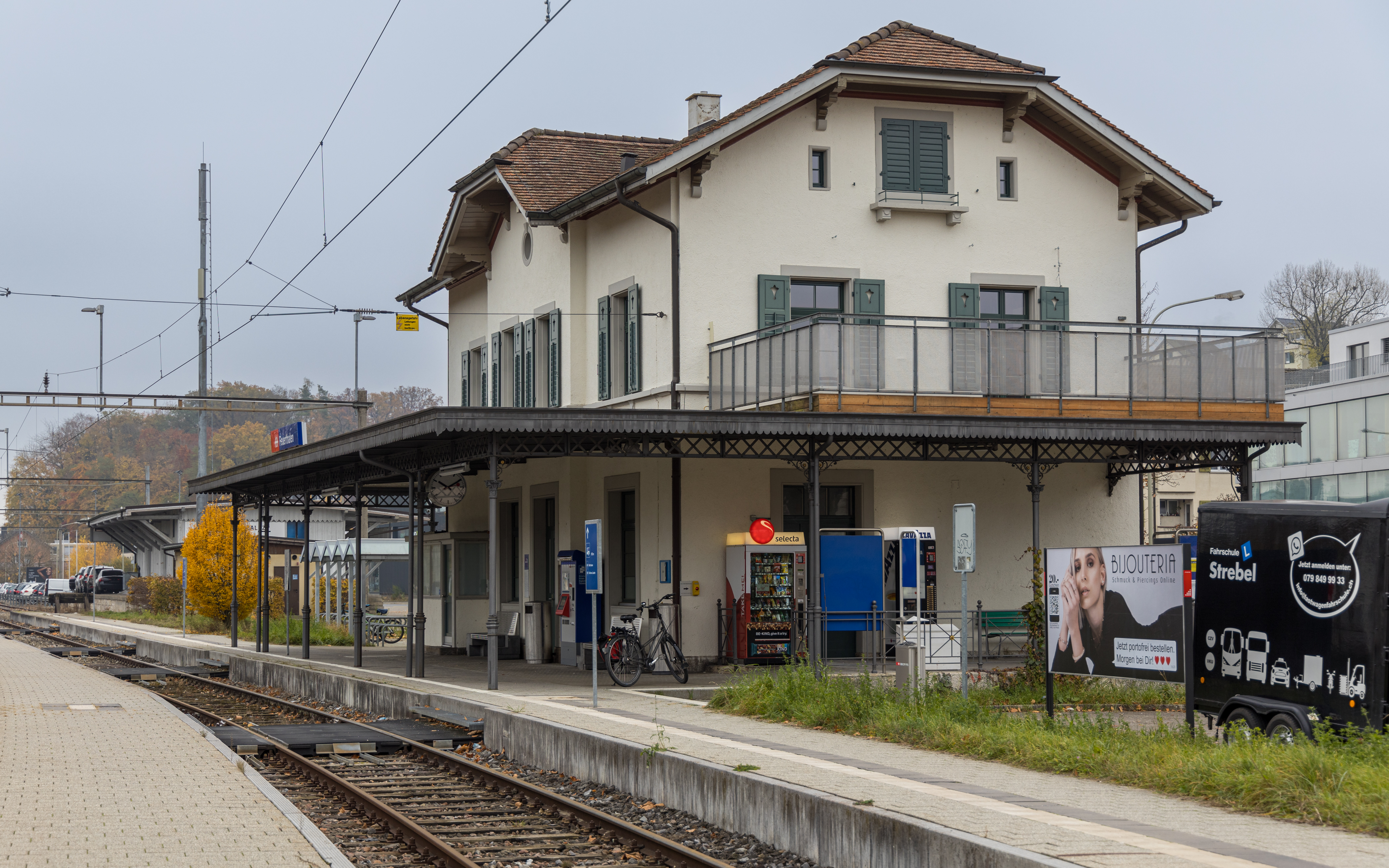

General information
- Location: Feuerthalen; Switzerland
- Coordinates: 47°41′31.790″N 8°38′45.427″E
- Elevation: 409 m (1,342 ft)
- Owner: Swiss Federal Railways
- Line: Lake Line
- Train operators: Thurbo

Other information
- Fare zone: 820 (Tarifverbund Ostwind)

Services
Preceding station	St. Gallen S-Bahn	Following station
Schaffhausen Terminus	S1	Langwiesen towards Wil
Preceding station	Zurich S-Bahn	Following station
Schaffhausen towards Winterthur	SN3 Limited service	Langwiesen towards Stein am Rhein
Location
- Location within Switzerland Location within Canton of Zurich

Feuerthalen railway station (German: Bahnhof Feuerthalen) is a railway station in Feuerthalen, in the Swiss canton of Zurich. It is an intermediate stop on the Lake Line and is served as a request stop by local trains only.

== Services ==
Feuerthalen is served by the S1 of the St. Gallen S-Bahn:

- S1: half-hourly service between Schaffhausen and Wil SG via St. Gallen.

During weekends, there is also a Zurich S-Bahn nighttime service (SN3) offered by ZVV.

- SN3: hourly service to Winterthur (via Schaffhausen) and Stein am Rhein.

== See also ==
- Rail transport in Switzerland
