= Dinhard =

- Municipality
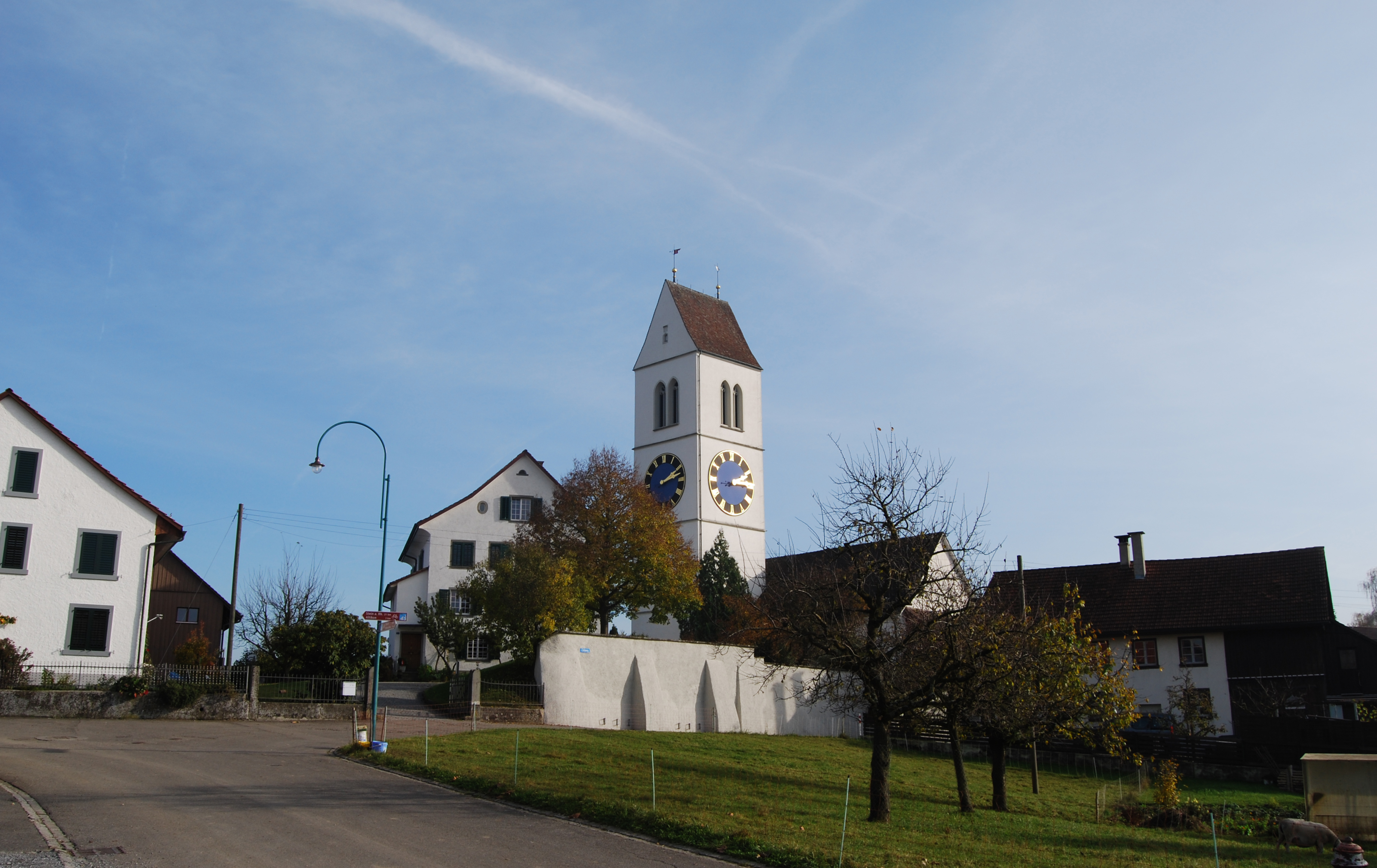

- Flag Coat of arms
- Location of Dinhard
- Location within Switzerland Location within Canton of Zurich
- Coordinates: 47°33′N 8°46′E
- Country: Switzerland
- Canton: Zurich
- District: Winterthur

Area
  - Total: 7.15 km^{2} (2.76 sq mi)
- Elevation: 434 m (1,424 ft)

Population (December 2020)
  - Total: 1,741
  - Density: 243/km^{2} (631/sq mi)
- Time zone: UTC+01:00 (CET)
  - Summer (DST): UTC+02:00 (CEST)
- Postal code: 8474
- SFOS number: 216
- ISO 3166 code: CH-ZH
- Surrounded by: Altikon, Dägerlen, Rickenbach, Seuzach, Thalheim an der Thur, Winterthur
- Website: www.dinhard.ch

Dinhard is a municipality in the district of Winterthur, which is located in the canton of Zürich in Switzerland.

== History ==
Aerial view by Walter Mittelholzer (1924)

Dinhard is first mentioned in 1275 as Thynart.

== Geography ==
Dinhard has an area of 7.1 km^{2} (2.7 sq mi). Of this area, 70.1% is used for agricultural purposes, while 19.5% is forested. Of the rest of the land, 10% is settled (buildings or roads) and the remainder (0.4%) is non-productive (rivers, glaciers or mountains). In 1996 housing and buildings made up 6.2% of the total area, while transportation infrastructure made up the rest (3.9%). Of the total unproductive area, water (streams and lakes) made up 0.4% of the area. As of 2007 6.3% of the total municipal area was undergoing some type of construction.

The municipality is located in the southern Zürcher Weinland. It consists of the villages of Kirch- and Ausser-Dinhard, Welsikon, Eschlikon and Vorder Grüt.

== Demographics ==
Dinhard has a population (as of 31 December 2020) of 1,741. As of 2007, 6.5% of the population was made up of foreign nationals. As of 2008 the gender distribution of the population was 51.3% male and 48.7% female. Over the last 10 years the population has grown at a rate of 7.6%. Most of the population (as of 2000) speaks German (97.3%), with English being second most common ( 0.7%) and Italian being third ( 0.5%).

In the 2007 election the most popular party was the SVP which received 46% of the vote. The next three most popular parties were the CSP (11.3%), the FDP (10.9%) and the Green Party (10.2%).

The age distribution of the population (as of 2000) is children and teenagers (0–19 years old) make up 27.2% of the population, while adults (20–64 years old) make up 63.6% and seniors (over 64 years old) make up 9.2%. The entire Swiss population is generally well educated. In Dinhard about 86.1% of the population (between age 25-64) have completed either non-mandatory upper secondary education or additional higher education (either university or a Fachhochschule). There are 500 households in Dinhard.

Dinhard has an unemployment rate of 1.07%. As of 2005, there were 92 people employed in the primary economic sector and about 30 businesses involved in this sector. 128 people are employed in the secondary sector and there are 20 businesses in this sector. 130 people are employed in the tertiary sector, with 38 businesses in this sector. As of 2007 39.4% of the working population were employed full-time, and 60.6% were employed part-time.

As of 2008 there were 220 Catholics and 912 Protestants in Dinhard. In the 2000 census, religion was broken down into several smaller categories. From the census, 72.3% were some type of Protestant, with 68.6% belonging to the Swiss Reformed Church and 3.6% belonging to other Protestant churches. 14.4% of the population were Catholic. Of the rest of the population, 0% were Muslim, 1.5% belonged to another religion (not listed), 2.5% did not give a religion, and 9.3% were atheist or agnostic.

The historical population is given in the following table:

year	population
1467	c150
1634	438
1771	619
1850	738
1900	639
1910	758
1950	586
1970	651
2000	1,301

== Transport ==
Dinhard railway station is served by Zurich S-Bahn line S29, which links Winterthur and Stein am Rhein.
