= Swiss National Railway =

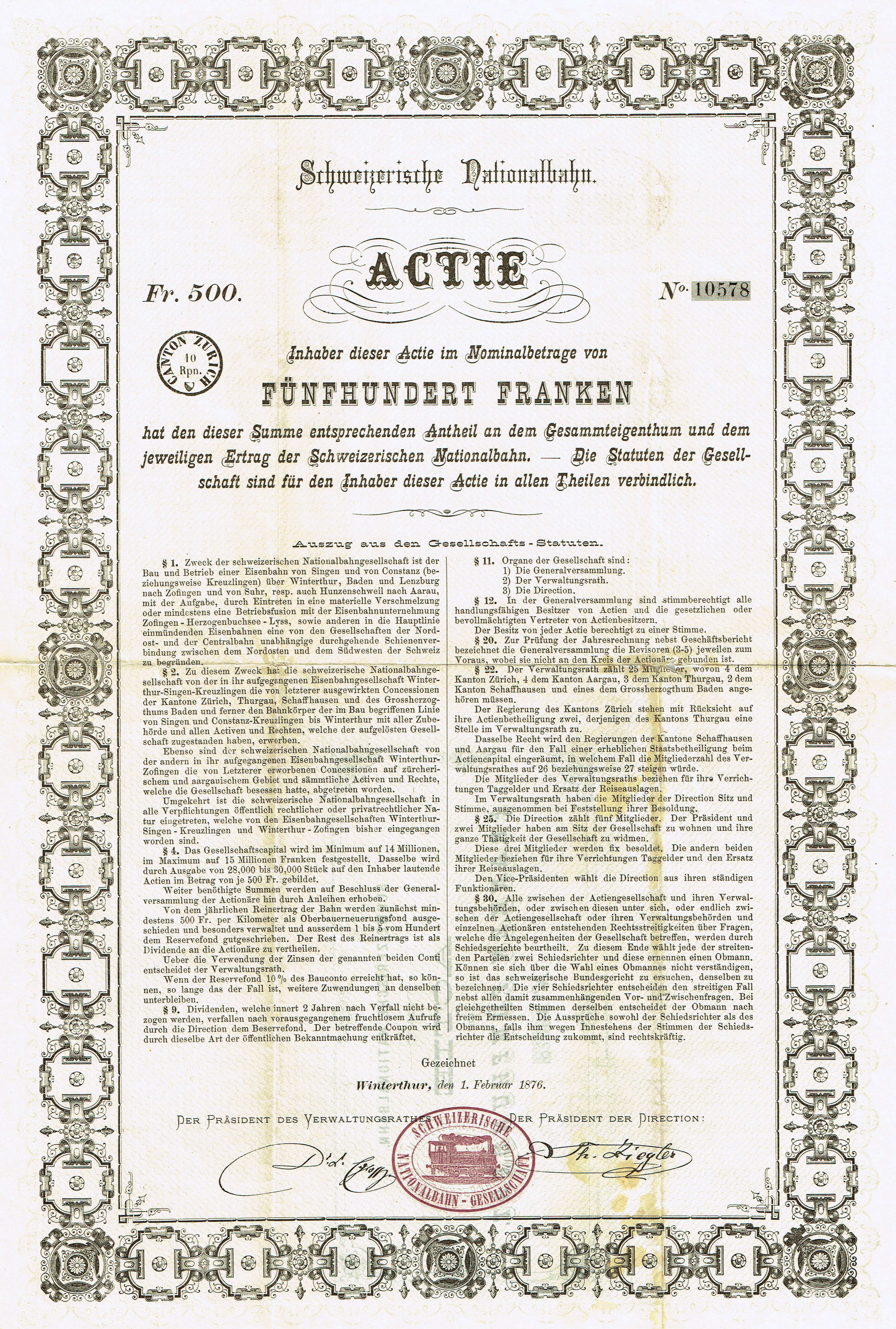
Share of the Swiss National Railway (Schweizerische Nationalbahn), issued 1. February 1876

The Swiss National Railway (German: Schweizerische Nationalbahn, SNB) was a railway company in Switzerland.

The Swiss National Railway was created in 1875 from the merger of the two companies, the Winterthur–Zofingen Railway and the Zofingen–Singen–Kreuzlingen Railway. The Winterthur Democratic Party promoted a railway funded by some communities and cantons to build a railway from Lake Constance to Lake Geneva to compete with the Swiss Northeastern Railway (German: Schweizerische Nordostbahn, NOB). This new line across of the Swiss Plateau would have bypassed the major economic centres and run through relatively sparsely populated areas. Unfortunately for the SNB, the established railways managed to gain the right to a new railway line concession in order to prevent it from connecting to Zürich as it had planned. In 1878 financial problems forced the SNB's liquidation, and the NOB took over its bankrupt estate for 12.4% of the face value of its shares. The cities of Winterthur, Baden, Lenzburg, Zofingen did not finish paying off the debts that they had incurred from investing in the SNB until the 20th century.

In 1877, the SNB built a railway through the Furttal (valley) linking Baden and northern Zürich. Following the bankruptcy of the SNB, the section of the Wettingen–Effretikon railway from Seebach to Wettingen was used for testing electric locomotives from the nearby Oerlikon locomotive works.

The Zofingen–Lenzburg line is generally known in vernacular Swiss as the "Nazeli", derived from the Nationalbahn.

== Lines ==
- Aarau–Suhr railway
- Zofingen–Wettingen railway
- Wettingen–Effretikon railway (also known as the Furttal Bahn)
- Winterthur–Etzwilen railway
- Etzwilen–Konstanz railway (part of the Lake Line)
- Etzwilen–Singen railway
- Kreuzlingen–Kreuzlingen port railway (part of the Lake Line)
