= Seuzach =

- Municipality
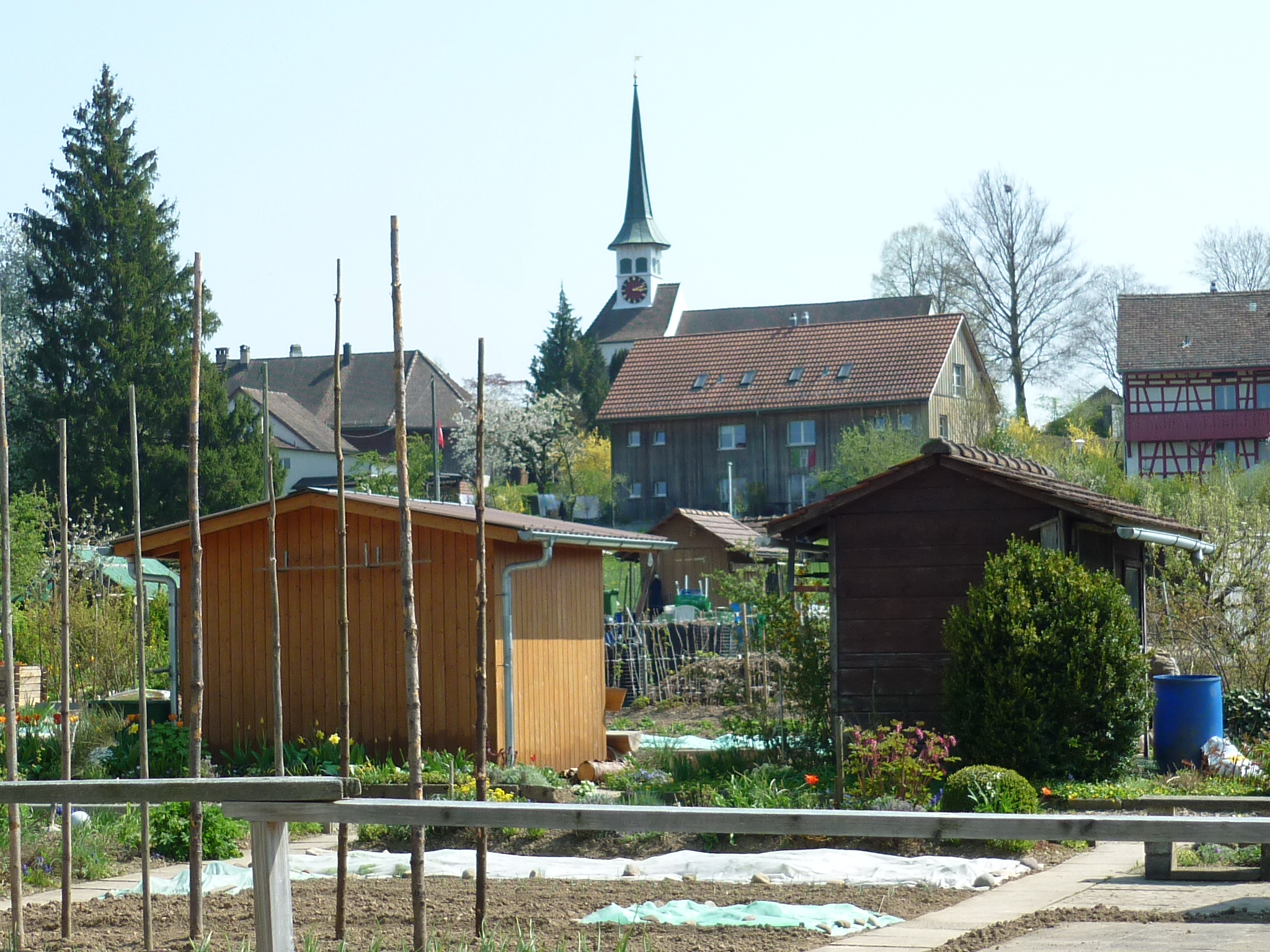

- Flag Coat of arms
- Location of Seuzach
- Location within Switzerland Location within Canton of Zurich
- Coordinates: 47°32′N 8°44′E
- Country: Switzerland
- Canton: Zurich
- District: Winterthur

Area
  - Total: 7.56 km^{2} (2.92 sq mi)
- Elevation: 455 m (1,493 ft)

Population (December 2020)
  - Total: 7,420
  - Density: 981/km^{2} (2,540/sq mi)
- Time zone: UTC+01:00 (CET)
  - Summer (DST): UTC+02:00 (CEST)
- Postal code: 8472
- SFOS number: 227
- ISO 3166 code: CH-ZH
- Surrounded by: Dägerlen, Dinhard, Hettlingen, Winterthur
- Website: www.seuzach.ch

Seuzach is a municipality in the district of Winterthur in the canton of Zürich in Switzerland.

== Geography ==
Aerial view from 400 m by Walter Mittelholzer (1923)

Seuzach has an area of 7.6 km^{2} (2.9 sq mi). 44.6% is used for agricultural purposes, while 24.3% is forested, 30.1% is settled (buildings or roads), and the remainder (0.9%) is non-productive (rivers, glaciers or mountains). In 1996 housing and buildings made up 20.4% of the total area, while transportation infrastructure made up the rest (9.9%). Of the total unproductive area, water (streams and lakes) made up 0.5% of the area. As of 2007, 22.1% of the total municipal area was undergoing some type of construction.

== Demographics ==
Seuzach has a population (as of 31 December 2020) of 7,420. As of 2007, 9.8% of the population was made up of foreign nationals. As of 2008 the gender distribution of the population was 49.6% male and 50.4% female. Over the last 10 years the population has grown at a rate of 11.1%. Most of the population (as of 2000) speaks German (92.5%), with Italian being second most common ( 2.1%) and Albanian being third ( 1.0%).

In the 2007 election, the most popular party was the SVP which received 41.8% of the vote. The next three most popular parties were the FDP (17.1%), the SPS (13.6%) and the CSP (10.4%).

The age distribution of the population (as of 2000) is children and teenagers (0–19 years old) make up 22.1% of the population, while adults (20–64 years old) make up 63.1% and seniors (over 64 years old) make up 14.8%. In Seuzach about 83.7% of the population (between age 25-64) have completed either non-mandatory upper secondary education or additional higher education (either university or a Fachhochschule). There are 2722 households in Seuzach.

Seuzach has an unemployment rate of 1.43%. As of 2005, there were 82 people employed in the primary economic sector and about 25 businesses involved in this sector. 740 people are employed in the secondary sector and there are 71 businesses in this sector. 1299 people are employed in the tertiary sector, with 174 businesses in this sector. As of 2007 32.7% of the working population were employed full-time, and 67.3% were employed part-time.

As of 2008 there were 1819 Catholics and 3600 Protestants in Seuzach. In the 2000 census, religion was broken down into several smaller categories. From the census, 57.9% were some type of Protestant, with 54.4% belonging to the Swiss Reformed Church and 3.5% belonging to other Protestant churches. 26.4% of the population were Catholic. Of the rest of the population, 0% were Muslim, 3.3% belonged to another religion (not listed), 2.5% did not give a religion, and 9.7% were atheist or agnostic.

== Transport ==
Seuzach railway station is the terminus of Zurich S-Bahn service S11, from Zurich, and is an intermediate stop on the S29, which links Winterthur and Stein am Rhein.
