= Etzwilen railway station =

Railway station in Switzerland

Etzwilen
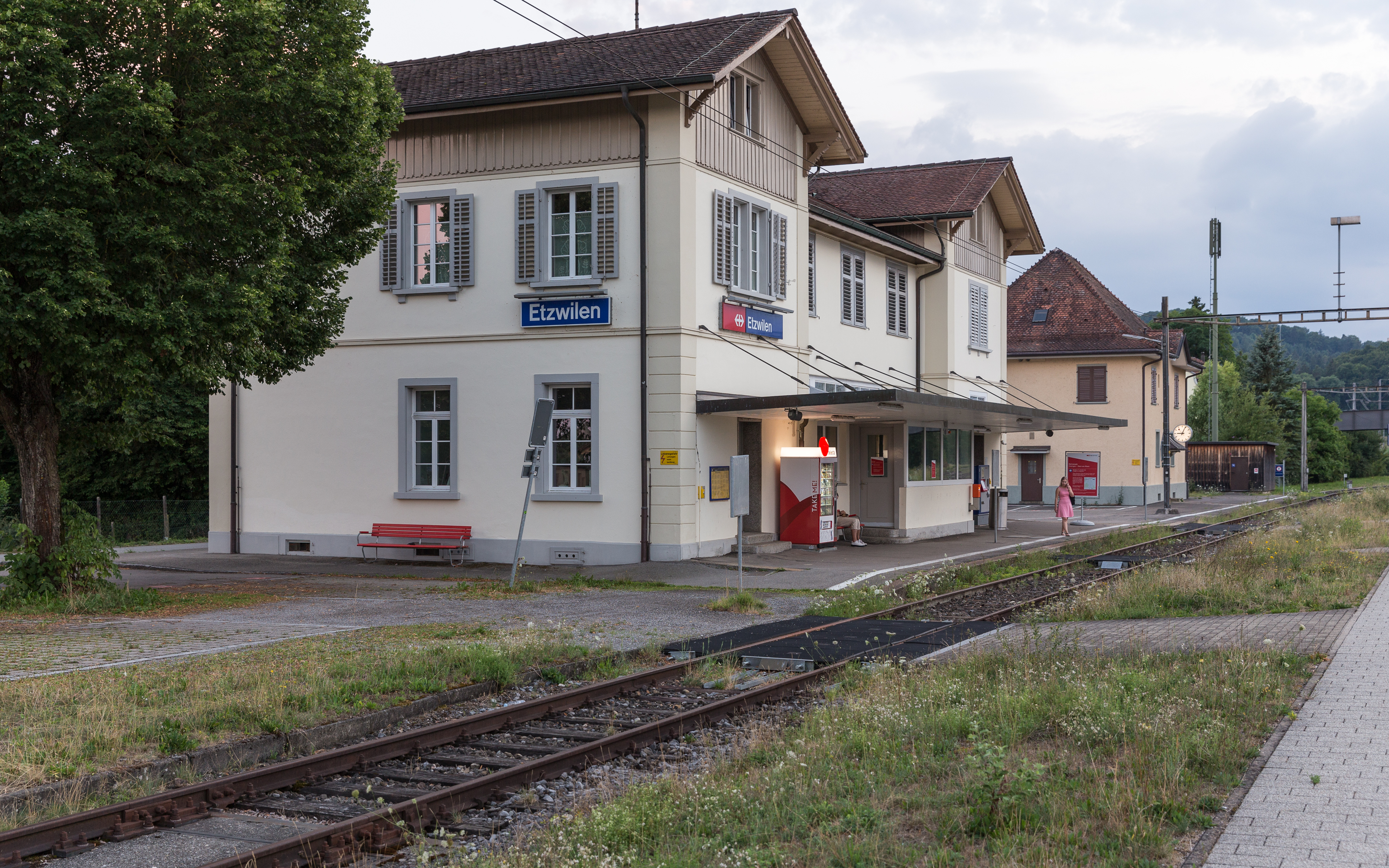
- The station building in 2017

General information
- Location: Bahnhofstrasse; Wagenhausen; Switzerland
- Coordinates: 47°39′40″N 8°49′8″E
- Elevation: 438 m (1,437 ft)
- Owner: Swiss Federal Railways
- Lines: Lake Line; Winterthur–Etzwilen; Etzwilen–Singen
- Train operators: Thurbo

Other information
- Fare zone: 845 (Tarifverbund Ostwind)

Services
Preceding station	Zurich S-Bahn	Following station
Stammheim towards Winterthur	S29	Stein am Rhein Terminus
Schlattingen towards Winterthur	SN3 Limited service	Stein am Rhein Terminus
Preceding station	St. Gallen S-Bahn	Following station
Schlattingen towards Schaffhausen	S1	Stein am Rhein towards Wil
Location
- Location within Switzerland Location within Canton of Thurgau

Etzwilen railway station is a railway station in the Swiss canton of Thurgau and municipality of Wagenhausen. It takes its name from the nearby settlement of Etzwilen. The station is located on the Lake Line, which links Schaffhausen with Rorschach, at its junction with the Winterthur–Etzwilen line and the Etzwilen–Singen railway.

== Services ==
=== S-Bahn ===
Etzwilen is served by regional trains S1 of St. Gallen S-Bahn (as a request stop only) and the S29 of Zurich S-Bahn:

- S1: half-hourly service over the Lake line from Schaffhausen to Wil SG via St. Gallen.
- S29: half-hourly service over the Winterthur–Etzwilen line to Winterthur and the Lake line to Stein am Rhein.

During weekends, there is also a Zurich S-Bahn nighttime service (SN3) offered by ZVV.

- SN3: hourly service to Winterthur (via Schaffhausen) and Stein am Rhein.

=== Heritage trains and draisines ===
During the warmer season and per order, the Museumsbahn SEHR & RS offers heritage train operations over the Etzwilen–Singen heritage railway line to Hemishofen, Ramsen, Arlen-Rielasingen and Singen (Hohentwiel). The line crosses the Germany–Switzerland border between Ramsen and Rielasingen. Part of the line can be driven with draisines on other days

== See also ==
- History of rail transport in Switzerland
- Rail transport in Switzerland
