= S29 (ZVV) =

Railway service in Switzerland

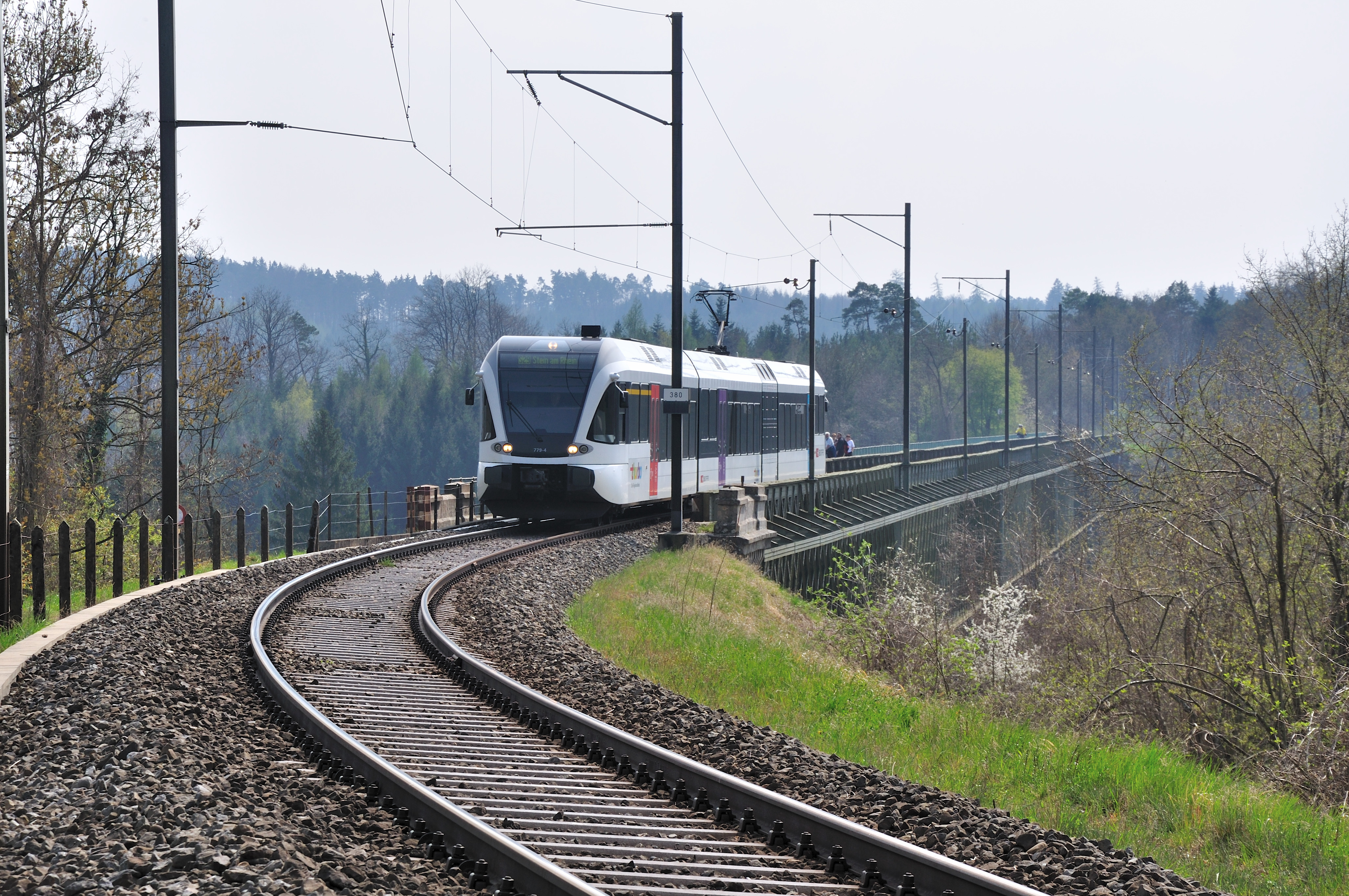
- S29 on the Thur bridge, south of Ossingen, in 2010.

Overview
- Status: Operational
- Locale: Switzerland
- Termini: Winterthur; Stein am Rhein
- Stations: 11
- Website: ZVV (in English)

Service
- Type: S-Bahn
- System: Zurich S-Bahn
- Operator(s): Zürcher Verkehrsverbund (ZVV)

Technical
- Track gauge: 1,435 mm (4 ft 8 1/2 in)

Zürich S-Bahn network as of December 2018

The S29 is a regional railway line of the Zurich S-Bahn on the ZVV (Zurich transportation network), in the cantons of Zurich, Thurgau and Schaffhausen.

== Route ==
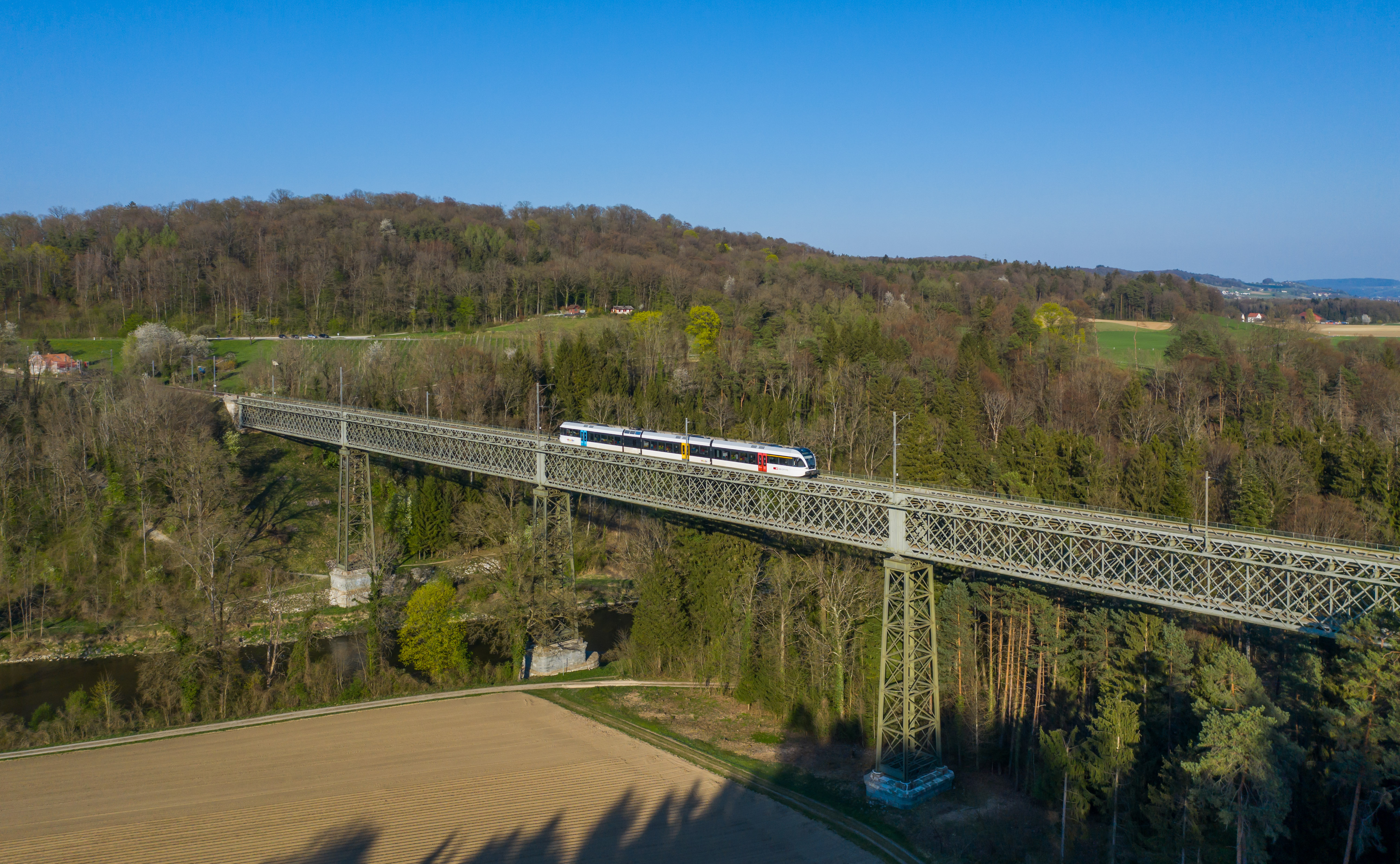
S29 service on the Thurbrücke over the River Thur

- S29 Winterthur–Stein am Rhein

The line operated by Thurbo, runs from Winterthur to Stein am Rhein, using the Winterthur–Etzwilen railway line (crossing the River Thur) as far as Etzwilen, and the Lake Line (Seelinie) from there on.

Trains usually run every 30 minutes (as of 2023) and a journey takes 46 minutes.

Alternative connections from Winterthur to Stein am Rhein are:

- via Schaffhausen using the S12/S33 of Zürich S-bahn to Schaffhausen, and then the S1 of St. Gallen S-Bahn along the Lake Line
- via Frauenfeld taking the S24/S30 of Zürich S-bahn or the InterCity/InterRegio to Frauenfeld, and then Postauto bus line 825 to Stein am Rhein

== Stations ==
- Winterthur
- Oberwinterthur
- Winterthur Wallrüti
- Reutlingen
- Seuzach
- Dinhard
- Thalheim-Altikon
- Ossingen
- Stammheim
- Etzwilen
- Stein am Rhein

== Rolling stock ==
The S29 service is operated with Thurbo rolling stock (Stadler GTW units).

== See also ==
- Rail transport in Switzerland
- Public transport in Zurich
- ZVV fare zones
