= Lake Line =

Railway line in Switzerland

Lake Line (Schaffhausen–Rorschach)
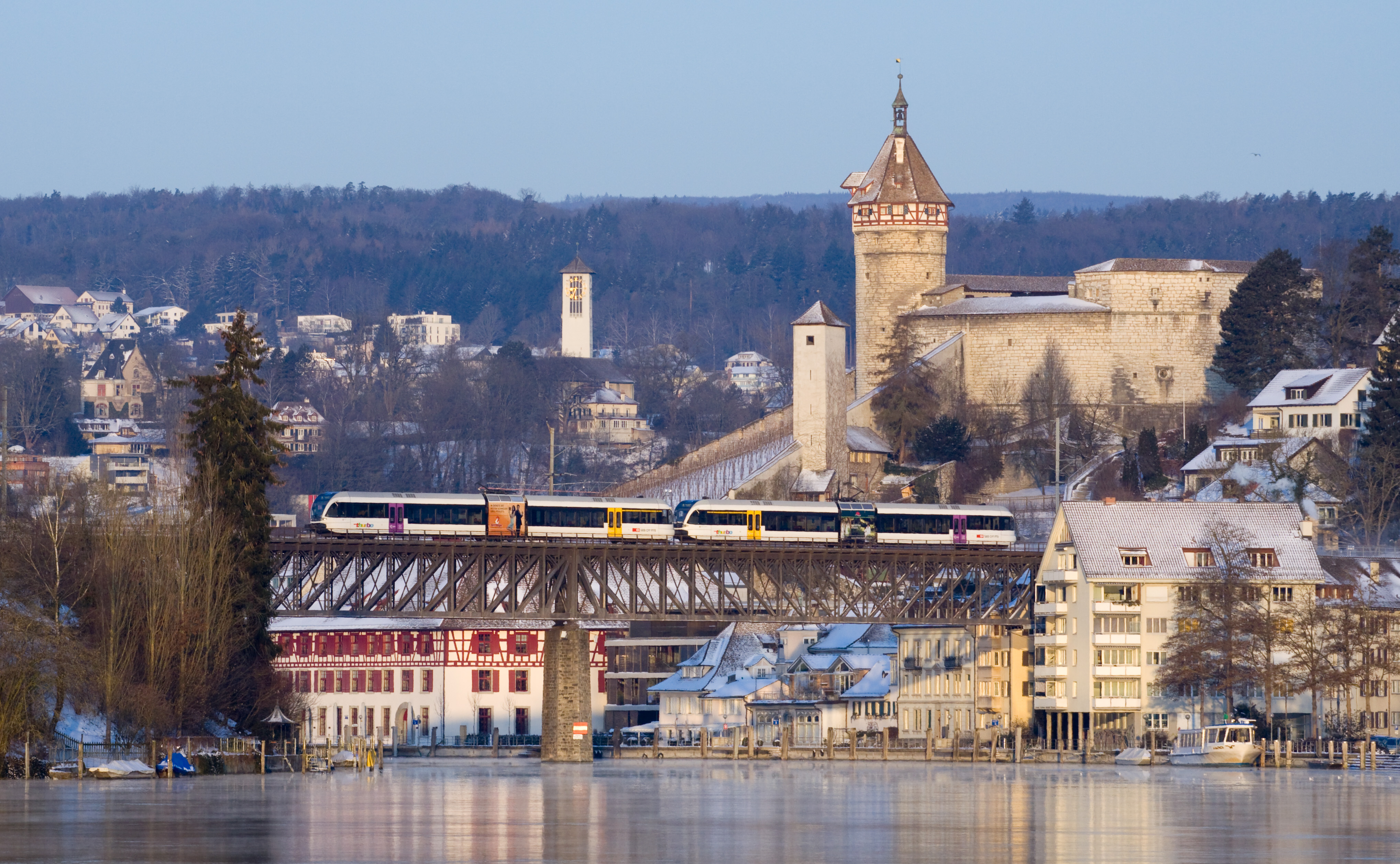
- Two GTW 2/4 sets of Thurbo on the Rhine Bridge at Feuerthalen near Schaffhausen; the Munot in the background

Overview
- Native name: Seelinie
- Line number: 820 (Schaffhausen–Romanshorn); 830 (Konstanz–Kreuzlingen–Weinfelden); 845 (Romanshorn–Rorschach)
- Locale: Switzerland and Germany
- Termini: Schaffhausen; Rorschach

Technical
- Line length: 82.4 km (51.2 mi)
- Number of tracks: mostly single track
- Track gauge: 1,435 mm (4 ft 8 1/2 in)
- Electrification: 15 kV/16.7 Hz AC overhead catenary
- Maximum incline: 1.2%

The Lake Line (German: Seelinie), as it is referred to by the SBB in English, is the Swiss railway line running from Rorschach via Romanshorn, Konstanz (Germany), Kreuzlingen, Steckborn, Stein am Rhein and Diessenhofen to Schaffhausen. The scenic route follows the southern border of Lake Constance (Bodensee) and the High Rhine (Hochrhein). It forms the Swiss section of the ring railway around Lake Constance.

== History ==
The Lake Line was built in four sections (see below) between 1869 and 1895. The loop via Konstanz crosses the border between Switzerland and Germany twice. The sections of the Lake Line were built by two railway companies, the Swiss Northeastern Railway (NOB) and the Swiss National Railway (SNB). The SNB were taken over by the NOB in 1878, and in 1902 the latter was transferred into the Swiss Federal Railways (SBB). In 1996, the line was taken over by the Mittelthurgaubahn following a competition. They introduced half-hourly fixed-interval services and modernised both track and rolling stock. When Mittelthurgaubahn went bankrupt in 2003 the line went into the possession of SBB's subsidiary THURBO, which had been intended as a joint venture between the SBB and Mittelthurgaubahn.

=== Rorschach–Romanshorn ===
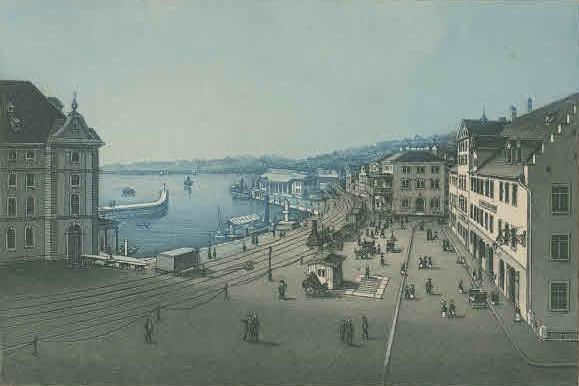
Rorschach Hafen in 1860

On 15 October 1869, the section from Romanshorn to Rorschach was opened by the NOB. It connected to the already existing railway between Rorschach and Rorschach Hafen of the United Swiss Railways (VSB), which opened in 1856. Between Rorschach and Rorschach Hafen, the NOB built its own track next to the VSB track and this section is still double-tracked today while the rest of the line is single-tracked (except for stations where trains cross regularly).

In 1893, the line was connected to the Thur Valley Railway so that trains could operate between Winterthur and Rorschach without reversing direction in Romanshorn. The NOB line competed with the Rorschach–St. Gallen railway and St. Gallen–Winterthur railway lines of VSB.

Between 1869 and 1976, train ferries operated from Romanshorn to other ports of Lake Constance.

=== Romanshorn–Kreuzlingen Hafen–Konstanz ===
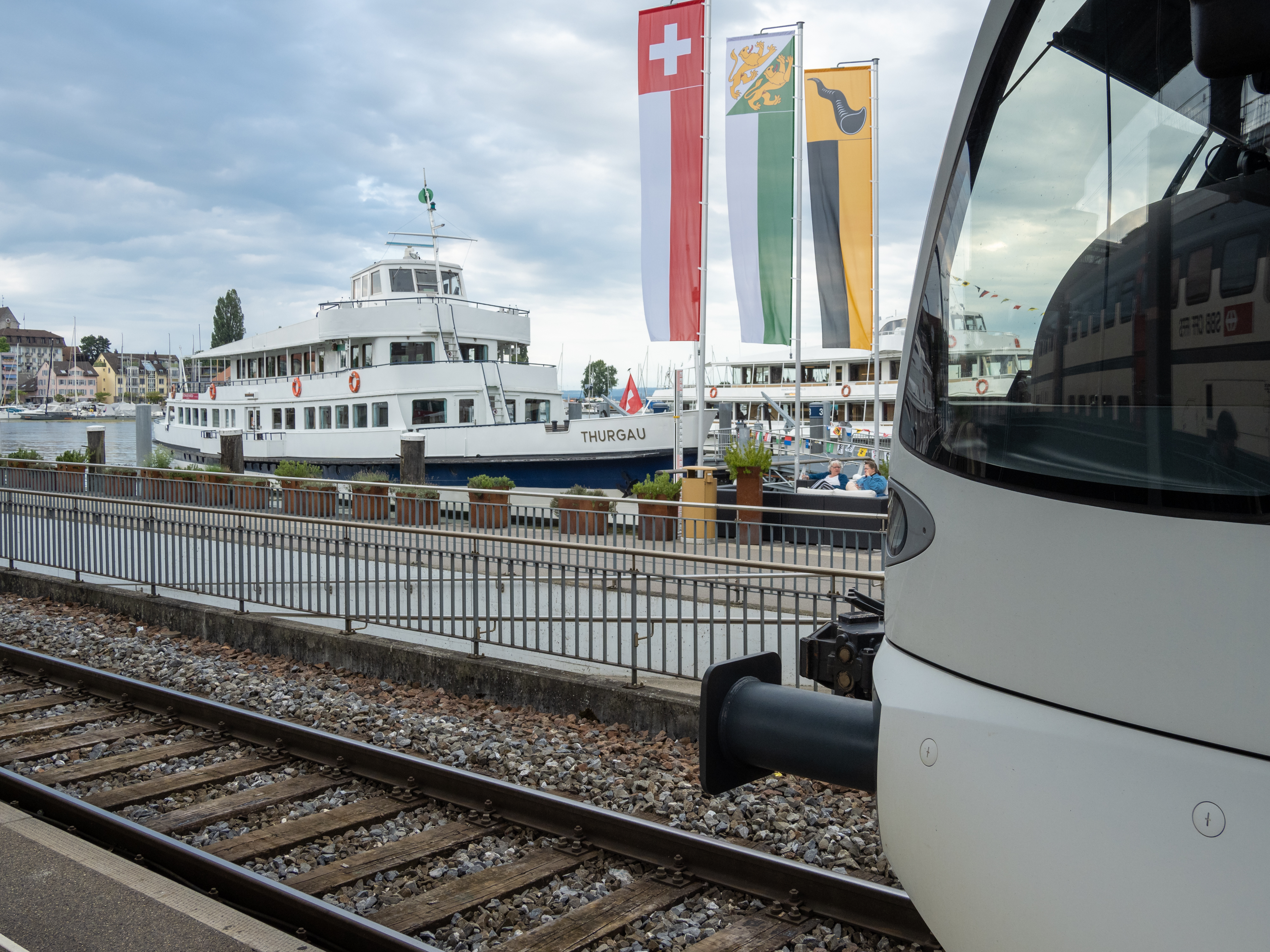
Romanshorn station

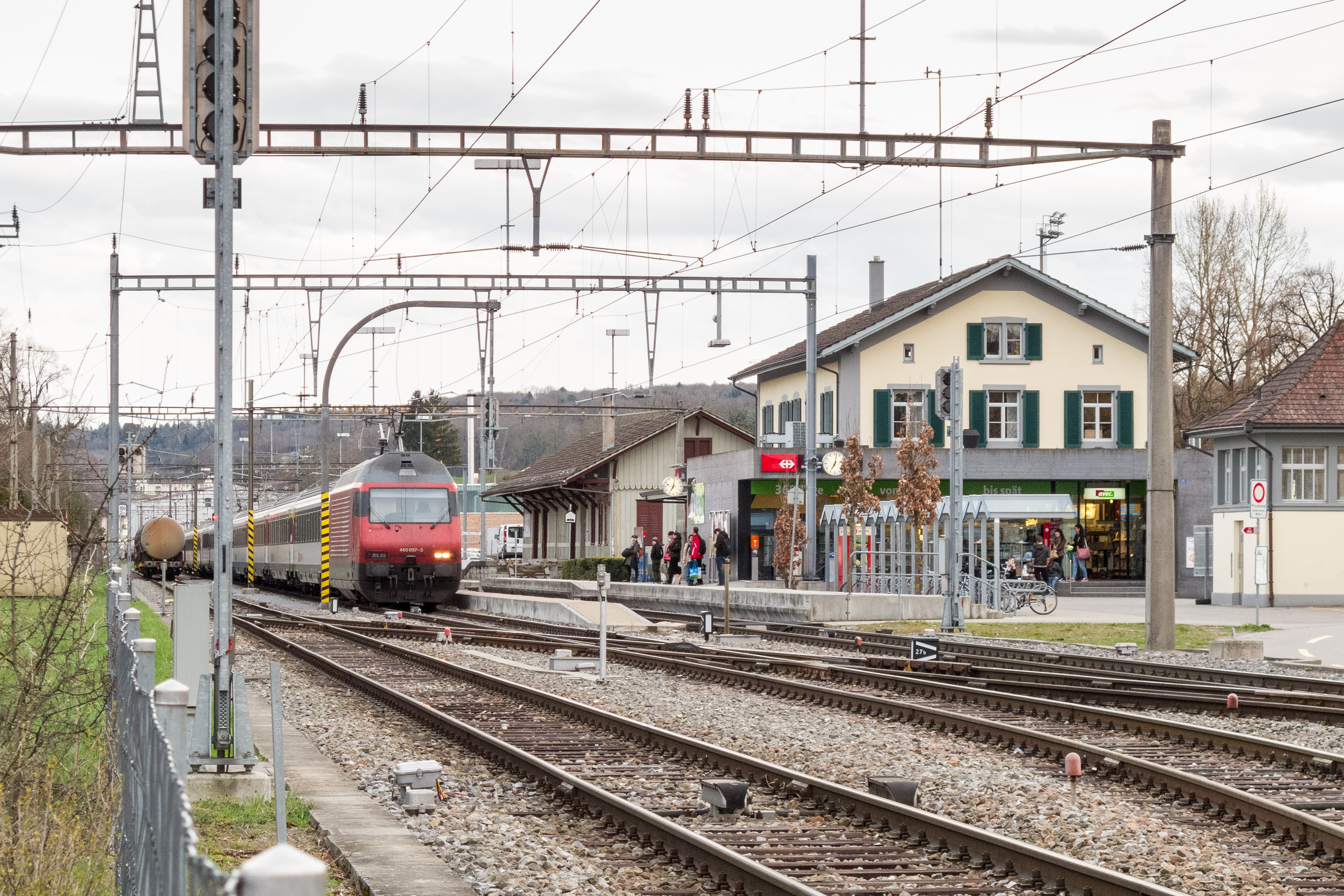
Kreuzlingen-Hafen

On 1 July 1871, not quite two years after the Rorschach–Romanshorn section started operations, the Romanshorn–Konstanz line opened by the NOB. It connects to the High Rhine Railway (between Basel and Konstanz), which opened in 1863. With the incorporation of Emmishofen into the municipality of Kreuzlingen in 1928, the former Emmishofen railway station changed its name to Kreuzlingen, and the former Kreuzlingen railway station became Kreuzlingen Hafen.

=== Etzwilen–Kreuzlingen–Konstanz ===
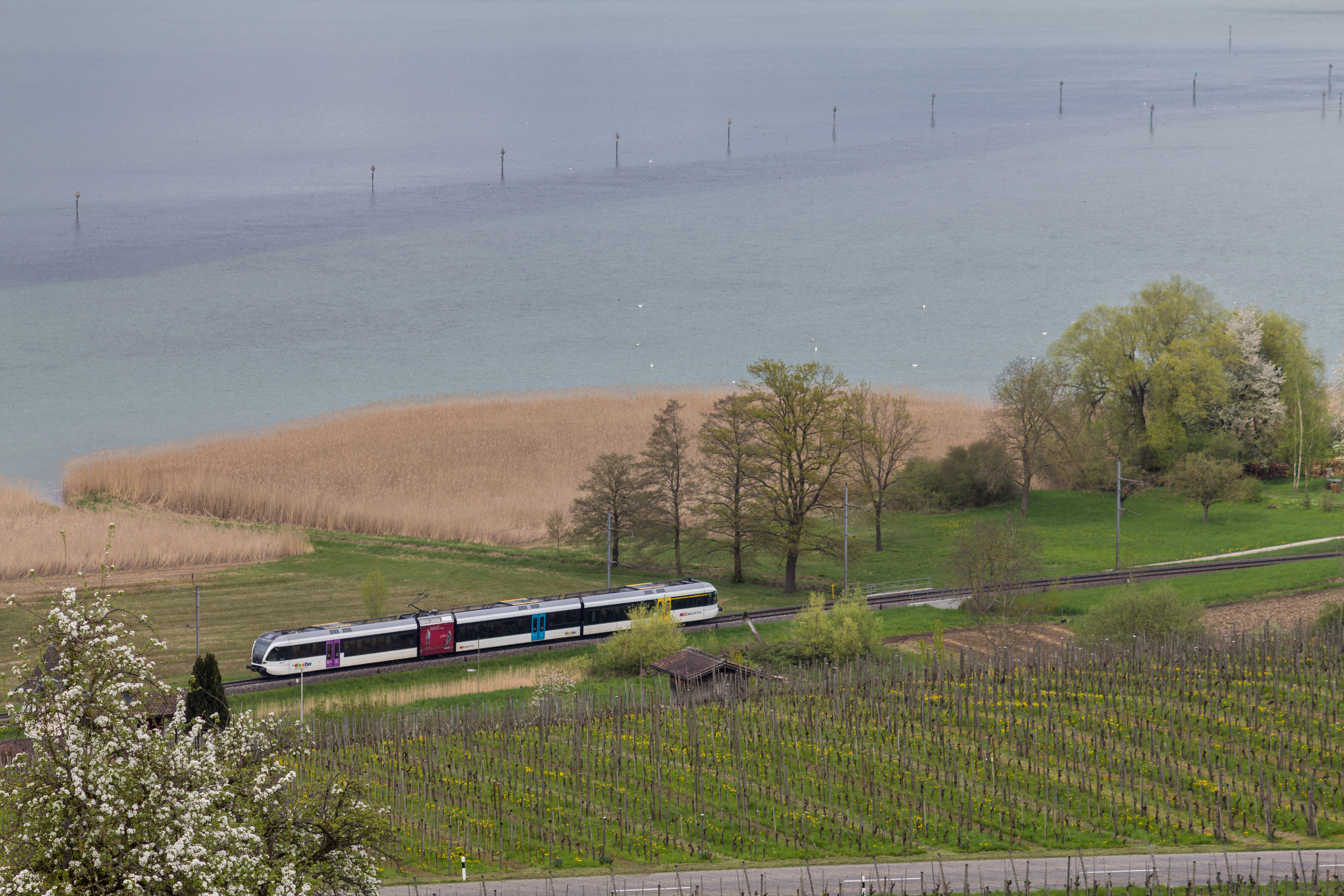
THURBO trainset passing by Untersee

The section along the lower Lake Constance (Untersee) was bult by the SNB, whose goal was to build an independent railway line between Lake Constance and Lake Geneva (Lac Leman). The section between Etzwilen and Konstanz/Kreuzlingen Hafen opened on 17 July 1875, on the same day as SNB's Winterthur–Etzwilen railway and Etzwilen–Singen railway lines. The SNB went bankrupt in 1878 and its railway lines were taken over by the NOB.

=== Schaffhausen–Etzwilen ===
The westernmost section between the city of Schaffhausen and Etzwilen was built by the NOB in order to connect the village of Stein am Rhein, located in the eastern part of the canton of Schaffhausen, with the capital of said canton. The section between Etzwilen and Feuerthalen opened on 1 November 1894. The final section between Feuerthalen and Schaffhausen, which features a steel bridge over the High Rhine and the Emmersberg tunnel, opened on 2 April 1895 due to delays in construction of the tunnel.

== Electrification ==
The sections of the Lake line are electrified since the following dates:

Date	Section
15 Mai 1928	(Winterthur–) Romanshorn–Rorschach
16 Dezember 1945	Schaffhausen–Etzwilen
6 Mai 1946	Kreuzlingen–Kreuzlingen Hafen–Romanshorn
7 Oktober 1946	(Winterthur–) Etzwilen–Stein am Rhein
5 Oktober 1947	Stein am Rhein–Kreuzlingen
27 Mai 1962	Kreuzlingen–Konstanz
1 Juni 1969	Konstanz–Kreuzlingen Hafen

== Services ==
There is currently no service operating on the entire line. As of the December 2023 timetable change, sections of the Lake Line are operated by the following regional train services, of which most belong to the Bodensee S-Bahn:

- S1 of St. Gallen S-Bahn between Romanshorn and Schaffhausen (operated by Thurbo)
- S7 of St. Gallen S-Bahn between Romanshorn and Rorschach (operated by Thurbo)
- S14 and S44 of St. Gallen S-Bahn between Kreuzlingen and Konstanz (operated by Thurbo)
- S25 of St. Gallen S-Bahn between Rorschach Hafen and Rorschach (operated by Appenzell Railways)
- S29 of Zürich S-Bahn between Etzwilen and Stein am Rhein (operated by Thurbo)
- RE1 between Konstanz and Romanshorn (operated by Thurbo)

The section between Kreuzlingen and Konstanz is also used by InterRegio service of Swiss Federal Railways (SBB).
