= Winterthur–Etzwilen railway line =

Railway line in Switzerland

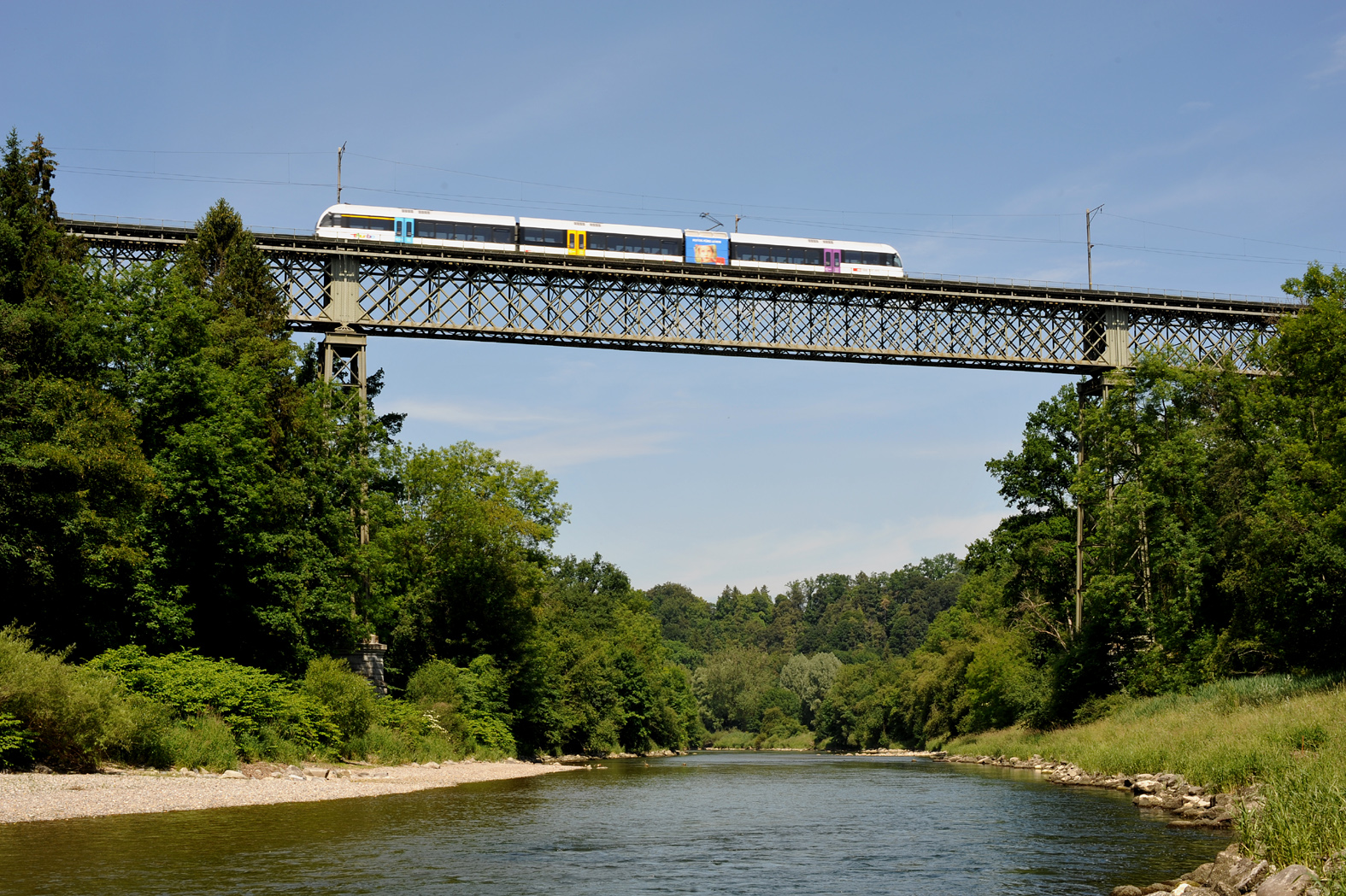
- Bridge carrying the line over the River Thur near Ossingen

Overview
- Owner: Swiss Federal Railways
- Locale: Switzerland
- Termini: Winterthur, Canton of Zurich; Etzwilen, Canton of Thurgau

History
- Opened: 17 July 1875

Technical
- Line length: 31.81 km (19.77 mi)
- Track gauge: 1,435 mm (4 ft 8 1/2 in)
- Electrification: 15 kV 16.7 Hz AC supplied by overhead line

The Winterthur–Etzwilen railway line is a railway line in Switzerland. It links Winterthur in the canton of Zurich with Etzwilen in the canton of Thurgau. The line is 31.81 kilometres (19.77 mi) long, standard gauge, single track and electrified at 15 kV 16.7 Hz AC supplied by overhead line.

The line was opened on 17 July 1875 between Winterthur and Etzwilen by the Swiss National Railway (SNB) company. By 1878 the railway company was in bankruptcy, and the line was taken over by the Swiss Northeastern Railway (NOB). Since 1902 the line has been part of the network of the Swiss Federal Railways (SBB). The line was electrified between Oberwinterthur and Etzwilen in 1946, the section from Winterthur Hbf to Oberwinterthur having been electrified since 1928.

The principal civil engineering structure on the line is the Thurbrücke Ossingen, a 332 metres (1,089 ft) long and 42 metres (138 ft) high five-span truss bridge over the River Thur. A 63 metres (207 ft) long two-span prestressed concrete bridge carries the line over the A1 motorway, built in 1967.

The line is served throughout by hourly passenger trains of Zurich S-Bahn line S29, which links Winterthur and Stein am Rhein. Additionally, alternate trains of line S11 provide an hourly service to Seuzach from Zurich.
