= Stein am Rhein railway station =

Railway station in the Swiss canton of Schaffhausen

Stein am Rhein
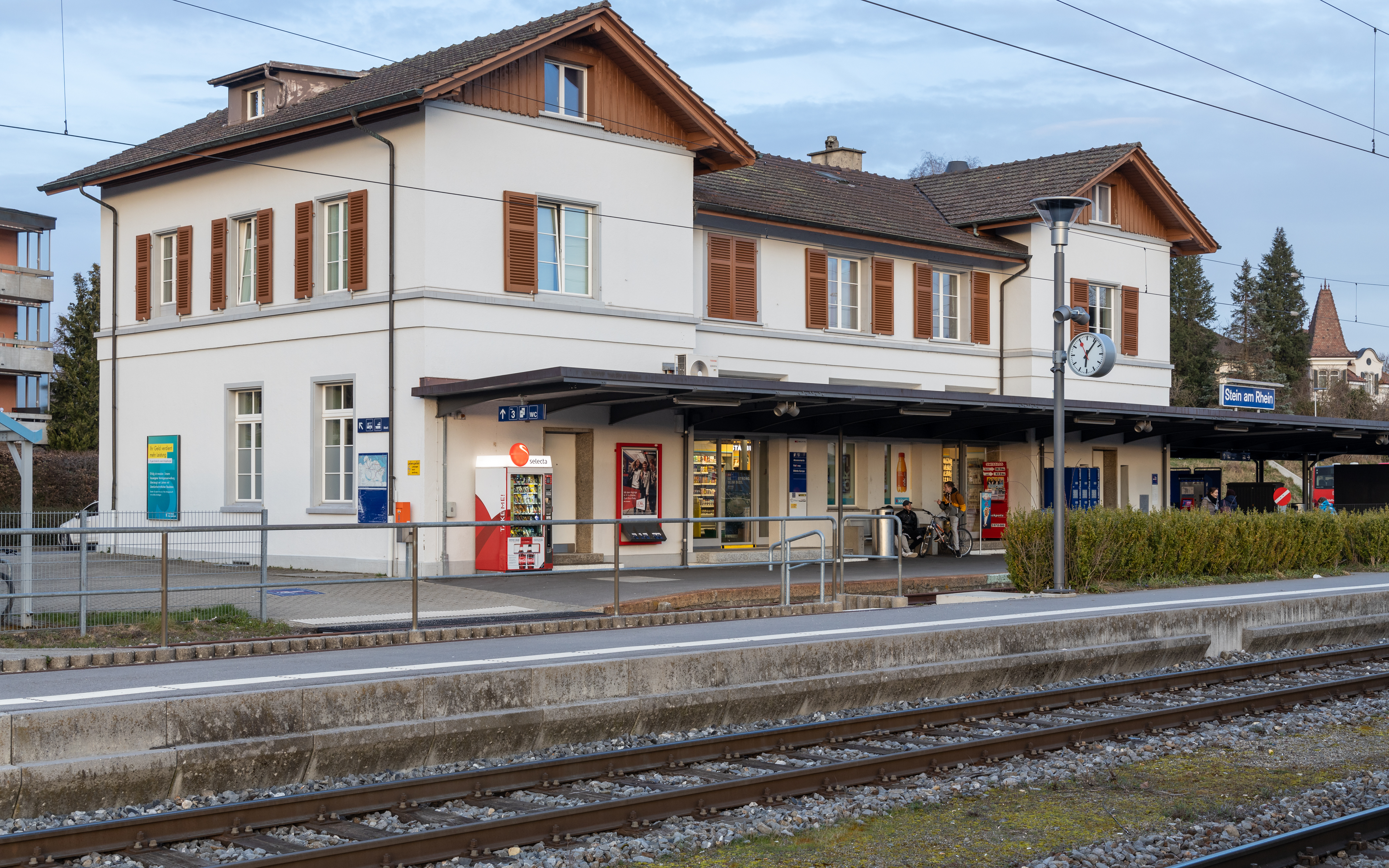
- Stein am Rhein railway station in 2020

General information
- Other names: Bahnhof Stein am Rhein
- Location: Bahnhofstrasse 1, Stein am Rhein; Switzerland
- Coordinates: 47.656108874°N 8.85500693112°E
- Elevation: 413 m (1,355 ft)
- System: Pass-through railway station
- Owner: SBB CFF FFS (Swiss Federal Railways)
- Operator: Thurbo
- Line: Lake Line
- Platforms: 1 island platform, 1 side platform
- Tracks: 3 (German: Gleis)
- Connections
- Bus: Südbadenbus 33 / 7349; PostAuto 825

Construction
- Structure type: at-grade
- Depth: 0
- Platform levels: 1
- Architect: Conrad Bär (1875)

Other information
- Fare zone: 845 (Tarifverbund Ostwind) (ZVV corridor)

Passengers
- 2016: n/a
- Rank: of 1735

Services
Preceding station	Zurich S-Bahn	Following station
Etzwilen towards Winterthur	S29	Terminus
Etzwilen via Schaffhausen towards Winterthur	SN3 Limited service	Terminus
Preceding station	St. Gallen S-Bahn	Following station
Etzwilen towards Schaffhausen	S1	Eschenz towards Wil
Location
- Location within Switzerland Location within Canton of Schaffhausen

Stein am Rhein railway station (German: Bahnhof Stein am Rhein) is a railway station in the Swiss canton of Schaffhausen and the municipality Stein am Rhein. The station is situated on the opposite (southern) bank of the Rhine to the historic centre of the town, a walk of some 500 m (1,600 ft). It is located on the Lake line (German: Seelinie), which links Schaffhausen with Rorschach.

The station is close to the Untersee (Lake Constance), and the Werd islands.

== Services ==
=== Train ===
As of the December 2023 timetable change, the station is served by the S1 of St. Gallen S-Bahn, which operates over the Lake Line from Schaffhausen to Wil SG via St. Gallen, and by Zurich S-Bahn line S29, which runs over the Lake line and Winterthur–Etzwilen railway line to and from Winterthur.

- St. Gallen S-Bahn / Bodensee S-Bahn S1: to Schaffhausen and to Wil SG via St. Gallen
- Zurich S-Bahn S29: to Winterthur via Etzwilen

During weekends, there is also a Zurich S-Bahn nighttime service (SN3) offered by ZVV.

- SN3: hourly service to Winterthur via Schaffhausen.

=== Bus ===
As of the December 2023 timetable change, two bus routes depart from the forecourt of the station, Südbadenbus line 33 / 7349 to Ramsen / Singen (Hohentwiel) and PostAuto line 825 to Frauenfeld.

== See also ==
- Rail transport in Switzerland
