= Häggenschwil-Winden railway station =

Train station in Switzerland

Häggenschwil-Winden
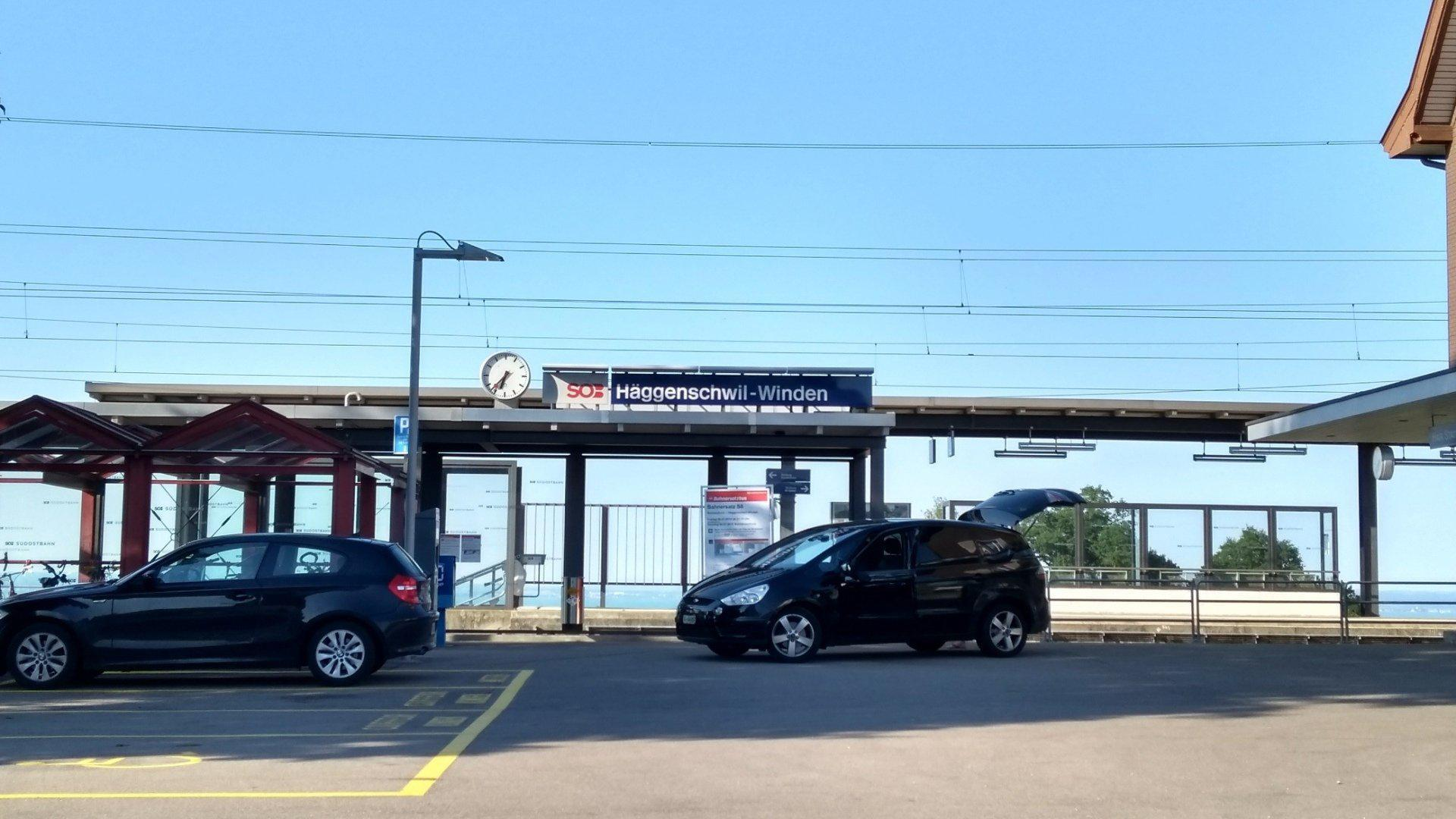
- The station platform in 2018; the station building is to the right

General information
- Location: Egnach; Switzerland
- Coordinates: 47°30′14″N 9°21′32″E
- Elevation: 512 m (1,680 ft)
- Owner: Südostbahn
- Line: Bodensee–Toggenburg line
- Train operators: Thurbo

Other information
- Fare zone: 228 (Tarifverbund Ostschweiz)

Services
Preceding station	St. Gallen S-Bahn	Following station
Muolen towards Schaffhausen	S1	Roggwil-Berg towards Wil
Muolen towards Romanshorn	SN72 Limited service	Roggwil-Berg towards Lichtensteig
Location
- Location within Switzerland Location within Canton of Thurgau

Häggenschwil-Winden railway station (German: Bahnhof Häggenschwil-Winden) is a railway station in Egnach, in the Swiss canton of Thurgau. The station sits just over the border from the Canton of St. Gallen, and its name comes from the St. Gallen municipality of Häggenschwil and village of Winden in Egnach. It is an intermediate stop on the Bodensee–Toggenburg line and is served as a request stop by local trains only.

== Services ==
Häggenschwil-Winden is served by the S1 of the St. Gallen S-Bahn:

- S1: half-hourly service between Schaffhausen and Wil via St. Gallen.

During weekends, the station is served by a nighttime S-Bahn service (SN72), offered by Ostwind fare network, and operated by Thurbo for St. Gallen S-Bahn.

- St. Gallen S-Bahn SN72: hourly service to Romanshorn and to Lichtensteig, via St. Gallen.

== See also ==
- Bodensee S-Bahn
- Rail transport in Switzerland
