= S1 (St. Gallen S-Bahn) =

Railway service in Switzerland

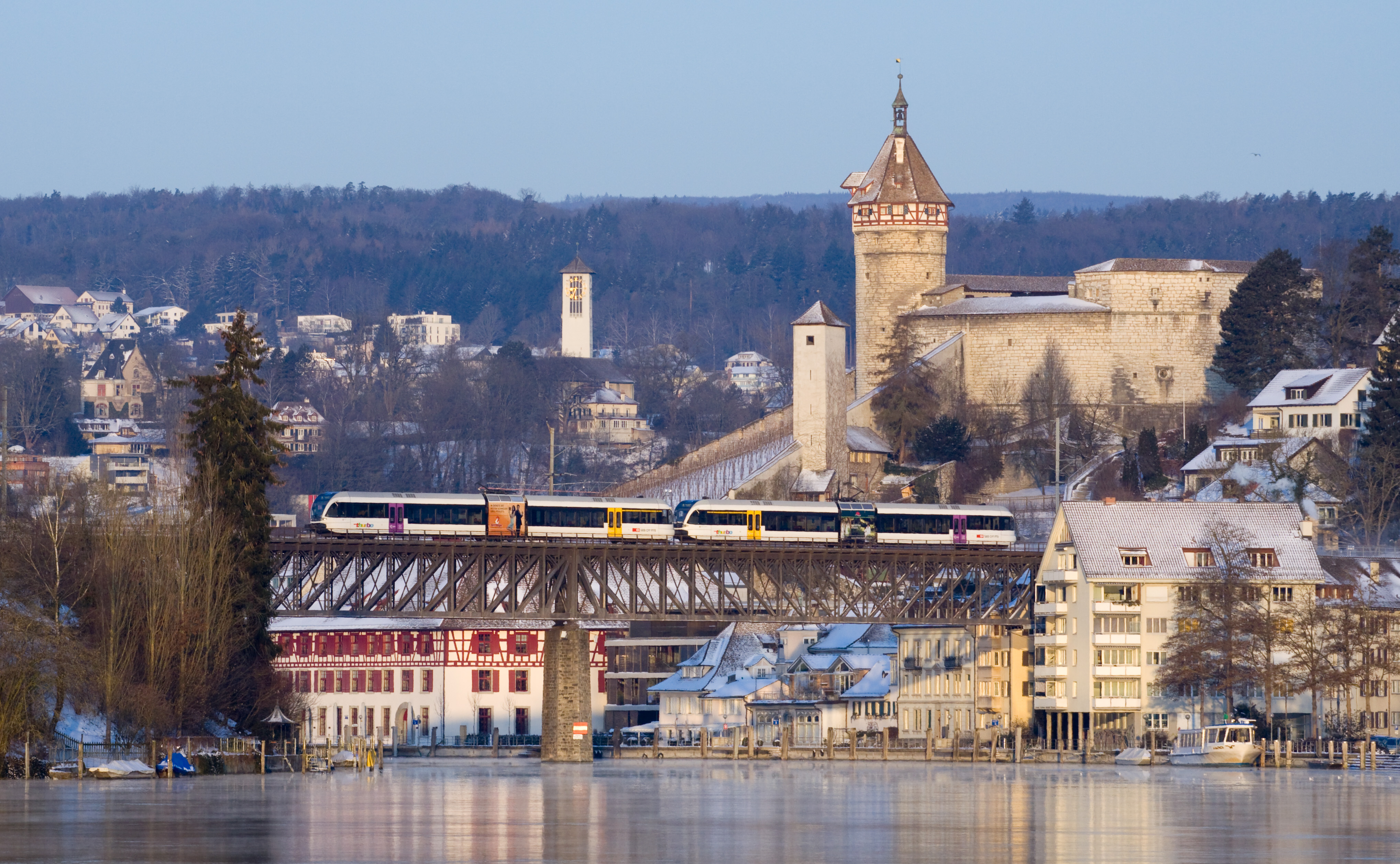
- A Wil-bound S1 on the bridge over the Rhine river (between Schaffhausen and Feuerthalen)

Overview
- Current operator(s): THURBO

Route
- Termini: Schaffhausen; Wil
- Stops: 42
- Distance travelled: 116.6 kilometres (72.5 mi)
- Average journey time: 2 hours 24 minutes
- Service frequency: Every 30 minutes
- Line(s) used: Lake line; Bodensee–Toggenburg line; St. Gallen–Winterthur line

The S1 is a railway service of the St. Gallen S-Bahn that provides half-hourly service between Schaffhausen and Wil, via St. Gallen, in the Swiss cantons of Zürich, Thurgau, Schaffhausen, and St. Gallen. The entire line is also part of the Bodensee S-Bahn. THURBO, a joint venture of Swiss Federal Railways and the canton of Thurgau, operates the service.

== Operations ==
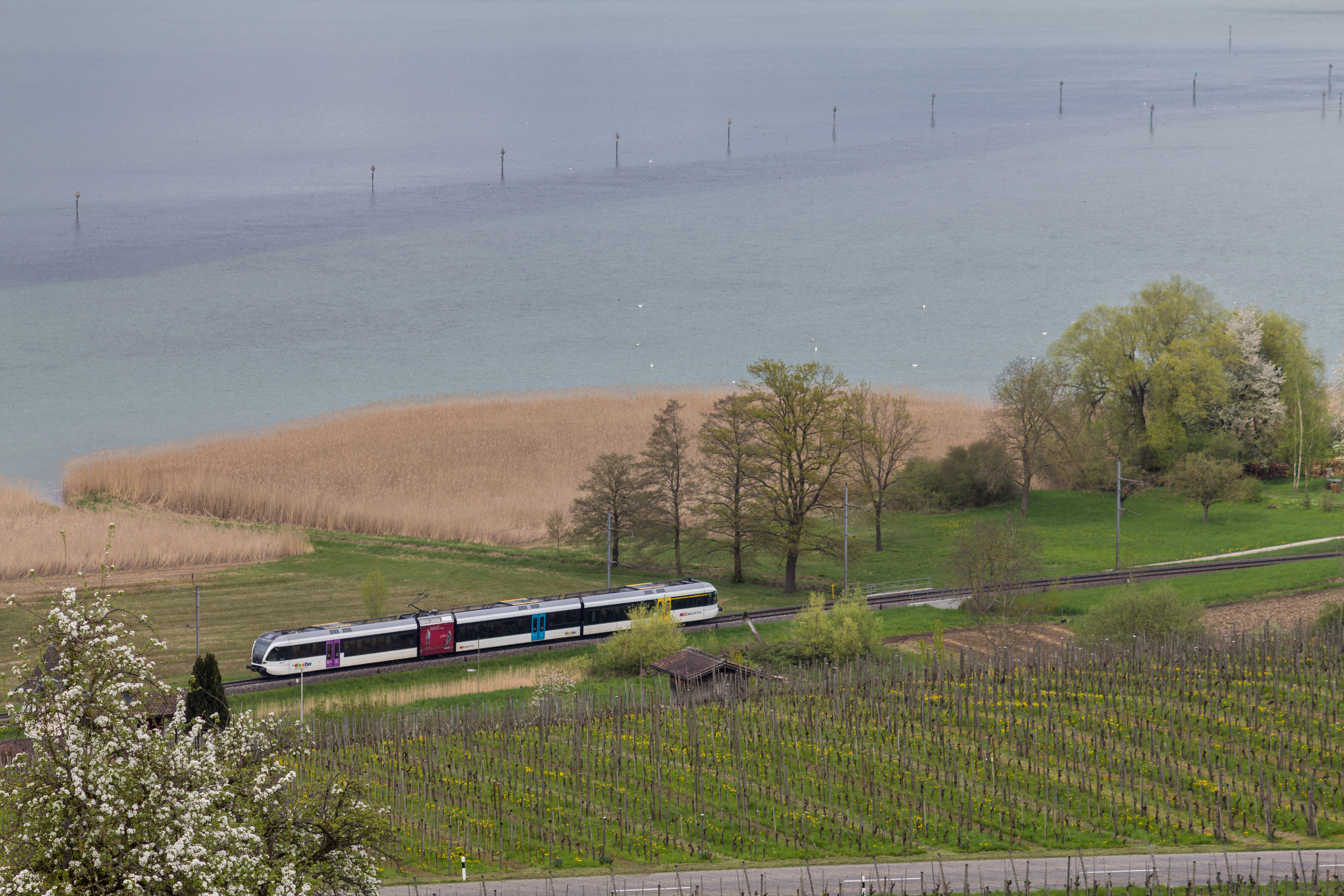
S1 service on the Lake Line between Triboltingen and Ermatingen, Lake Constance

The S1 operates every half-hour between Schaffhausen and Wil over the Lake line (Schaffhausen–Romanshorn), Bodensee–Toggenburg line (Romanshorn–St. Gallen), and St. Gallen–Winterthur line (St. Gallen–Wil). It shares the Konstanz–St. Gallen and St. Gallen–Wil portions with various regional and long-distance trains, plus the S5 between St. Gallen and Gossau SG. Between Wil and Uzwil it passes Schwarzenbach and Algetshausen-Henau stations, which are both disused since 2013.

The S1 allows for combined round trips by train and boat on the section along the High Rhine and Lower Lake Constance (Schaffhausen–Kreuzlingen), which is operated by the URh navigation company. In addition, Romanshorn and Kreuzlingen Hafen stations are both located close to landing stages on Upper Lake Constance, which are served by boats and ferries.

== Route ==
S1 Wil SG – St. Gallen – Romanshorn – Kreuzlingen – Stein am Rhein – Schaffhausen

- Wil SG
- Uzwil
- Flawil
- Gossau SG
- St. Gallen Winkeln
- St. Gallen Bruggen
- St. Gallen
- St. Gallen St. Fiden
- Wittenbach
- Roggwil-Berg (stops only on request)
- Häggenschwil-Winden (stops only on request)
- Muolen
- Steinebrunn
- Neukirch-Egnach (stops only on request)
- Romanshorn
- Uttwil (stops only on request)
- Kesswil (stops only on request)
- Güttingen (stops only on request)
- Altnau (stops only on request)
- Landschlacht (stops only on request)
- Münsterlingen Spital (stops only on request)
- Münsterlingen-Scherzingen (stops only on request)
- Bottighofen (stops only on request)
- Kurzrickenbach Seepark (stops only on request)
- Kreuzlingen Hafen
- Kreuzlingen
- Tägerwilen-Gottlieben (stops only on request)
- Triboltingen (stops only on request)
- Ermatingen (stops only on request)
- Mannenbach-Salenstein (stops only on request)
- Berlingen (stops only on request)
- Steckborn
- Mammern (stops only on request)
- Eschenz (stops only on request)
- Stein am Rhein
- Etzwilen (stops only on request)
- Schlattingen (stops only on request)
- Diessenhofen
- St. Katharinental (stops only on request)
- Schlatt (stops only on request)
- Langwiesen (stops only on request)
- Feuerthalen (stops only on request)
- Schaffhausen

== History ==
Until the December 2013 timetable change, the S1 continued east from St. Gallen to Altstätten SG, on the Chur–Rorschach line. The service was truncated when the Rheintal-Express was extended west from St. Gallen to Wil. With the December 2018 change the S1 began running half-hourly and InterRegio 13 replaced the Rheintal-Express.

Between the December 2018 and December 2021 timetable changes the S1 operated every half-hour between Wil and St. Gallen, continuing from St. Gallen to Schaffhausen as the S8. With the December 2021 timetable change, the entire Wil–St. Gallen–Schaffhausen route was designated as the S1, albeit with the timetable color formerly associated with the S8.
