= Steinebrunn railway station =

Train station in Switzerland

Steinebrunn
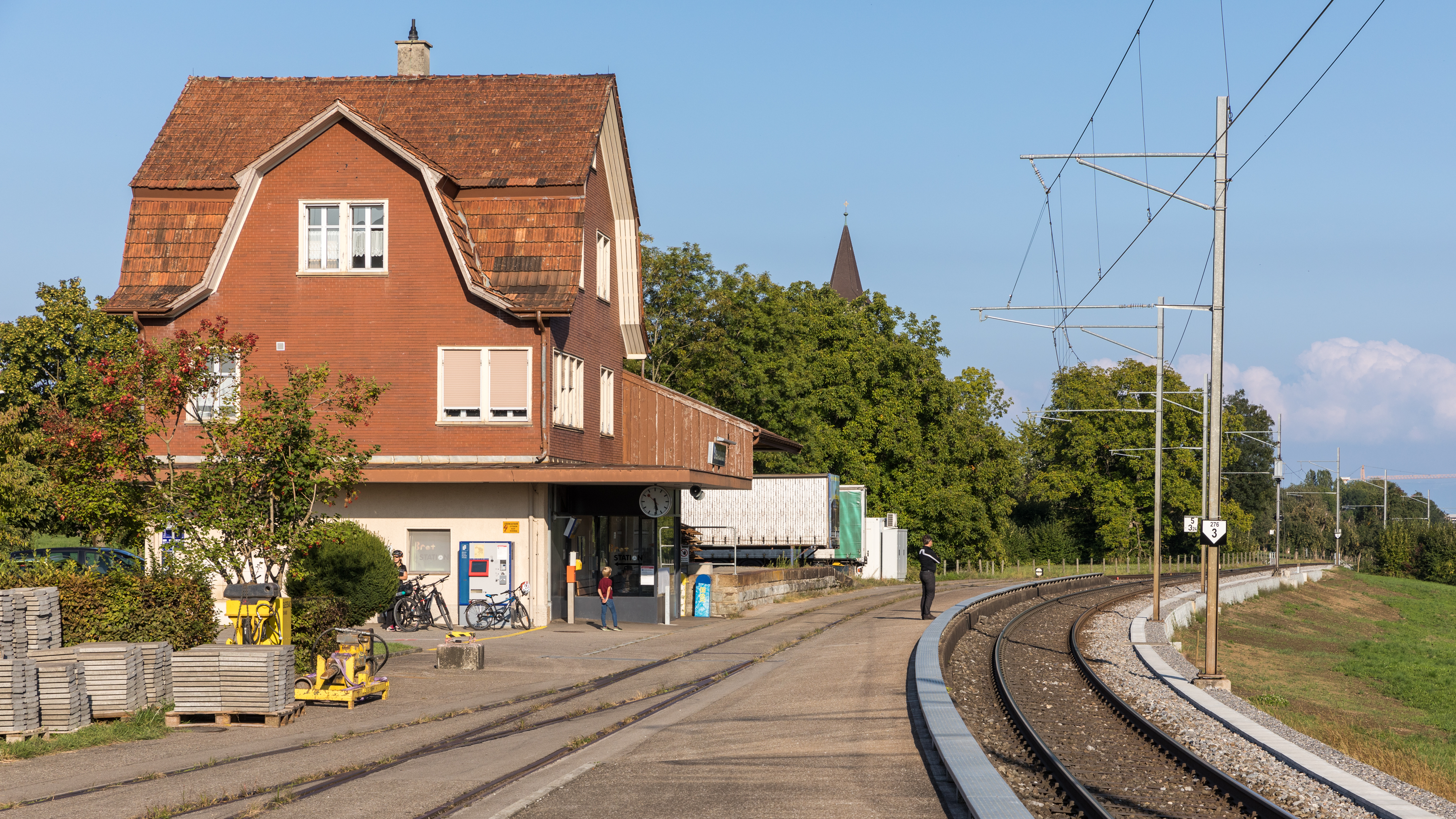
- The station building in 2018

General information
- Location: Egnach; Switzerland
- Coordinates: 47°31′55″N 9°21′0″E
- Elevation: 448 m (1,470 ft)
- Owner: Südostbahn
- Line: Bodensee–Toggenburg line
- Train operators: Thurbo

Other information
- Fare zone: 230 (Tarifverbund Ostschweiz)

Services
Preceding station	St. Gallen S-Bahn	Following station
Neukirch-Egnach towards Schaffhausen	S1	Muolen towards Wil
Neukirch-Egnach towards Romanshorn	SN72 Limited service	Muolen towards Lichtensteig
Location
- Location within Switzerland Location within Canton of Thurgau

Steinebrunn railway station (German: Bahnhof Steinebrunn) is a railway station in Egnach, in the Swiss canton of Thurgau. It is an intermediate stop on the Bodensee–Toggenburg line and is served by local trains only.

== Services ==
Steinebrunn is served by the S1 of the St. Gallen S-Bahn:

- S1: half-hourly service between Schaffhausen and Wil via St. Gallen.

During weekends, the station is served by a nighttime S-Bahn service (SN72), offered by Ostwind fare network, and operated by Thurbo for St. Gallen S-Bahn.

- St. Gallen S-Bahn SN72: hourly service to Romanshorn and to Lichtensteig, via St. Gallen.

== See also ==
- Bodensee S-Bahn
- Rail transport in Switzerland
