= Neukirch-Egnach railway station =

Railway station on the Bodensee-Toggenburg line in Egnach, Thurgau

Neukirch-Egnach
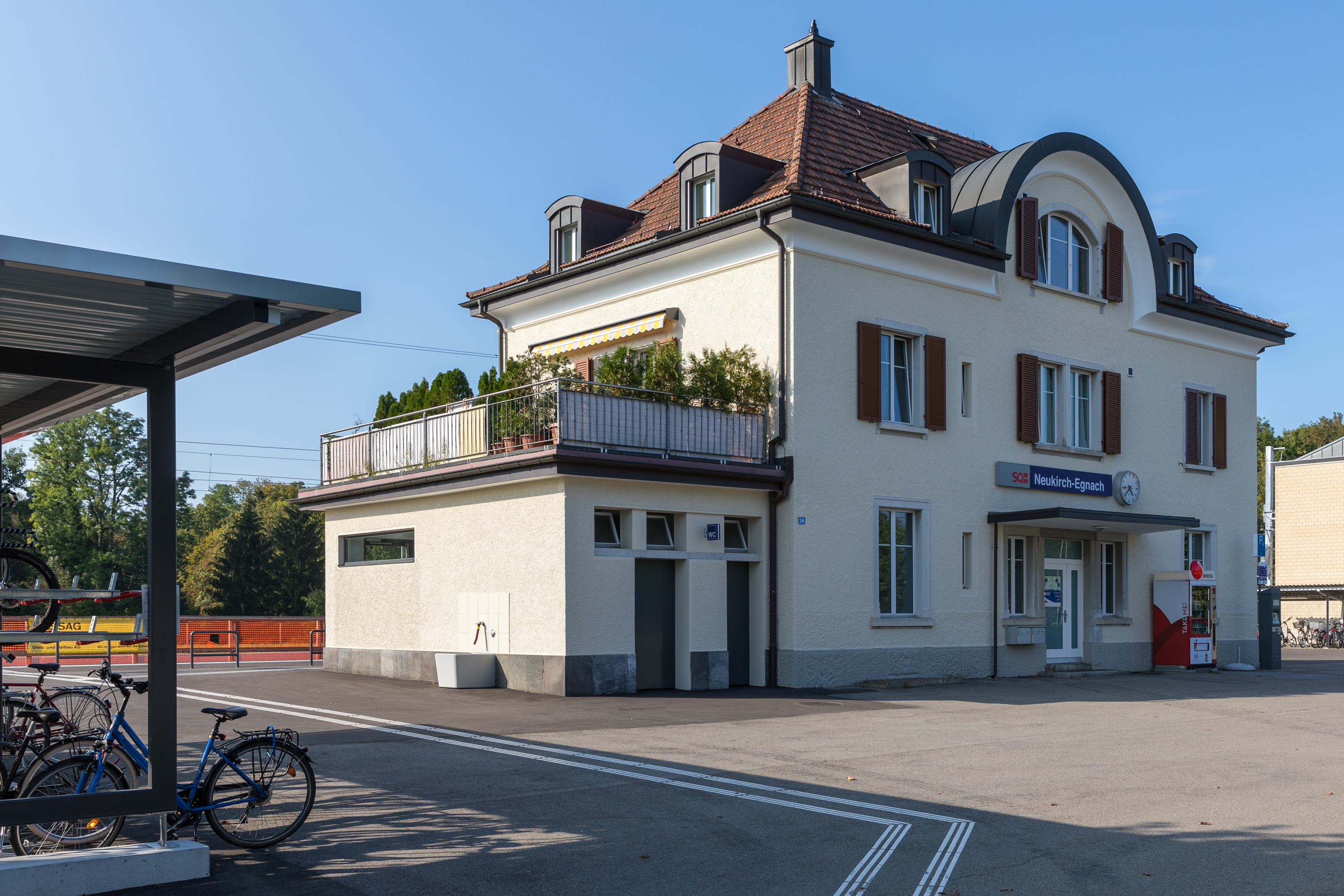
- The station building in 2018

General information
- Location: Egnach; Switzerland
- Coordinates: 47°32′20″N 9°22′34″E
- Elevation: 412 m (1,352 ft)
- Owner: Südostbahn
- Line: Bodensee–Toggenburg line
- Train operators: Thurbo

Other information
- Fare zone: 230 (Tarifverbund Ostschweiz)

Services
Preceding station	St. Gallen S-Bahn	Following station
Romanshorn towards Schaffhausen	S1	Steinebrunn towards Wil
Romanshorn Terminus	SN72 Limited service	Steinebrunn towards Lichtensteig
Location
- Location within Switzerland Location within Canton of Thurgau

Neukirch-Egnach railway station (German: Bahnhof Neukirch-Egnach) is a railway station in Egnach, in the Swiss canton of Thurgau. It is an intermediate stop on the Bodensee–Toggenburg line and is served as a request stop by local trains only. The station is approximately 800 metres (2,600 ft) from the Egnach station on the Lake line.

== Services ==
Neukirch-Egnach is served by the S1 of the St. Gallen S-Bahn:

- S1: half-hourly service between Schaffhausen and Wil via St. Gallen.

During weekends, the station is served by a nighttime S-Bahn service (SN72), offered by Ostwind fare network, and operated by Thurbo for St. Gallen S-Bahn.

- St. Gallen S-Bahn SN72: hourly service to Romanshorn and to Lichtensteig, via St. Gallen.

== See also ==
- Bodensee S-Bahn
- Rail transport in Switzerland
