= Muolen railway station =

Train station in Switzerland

Muolen
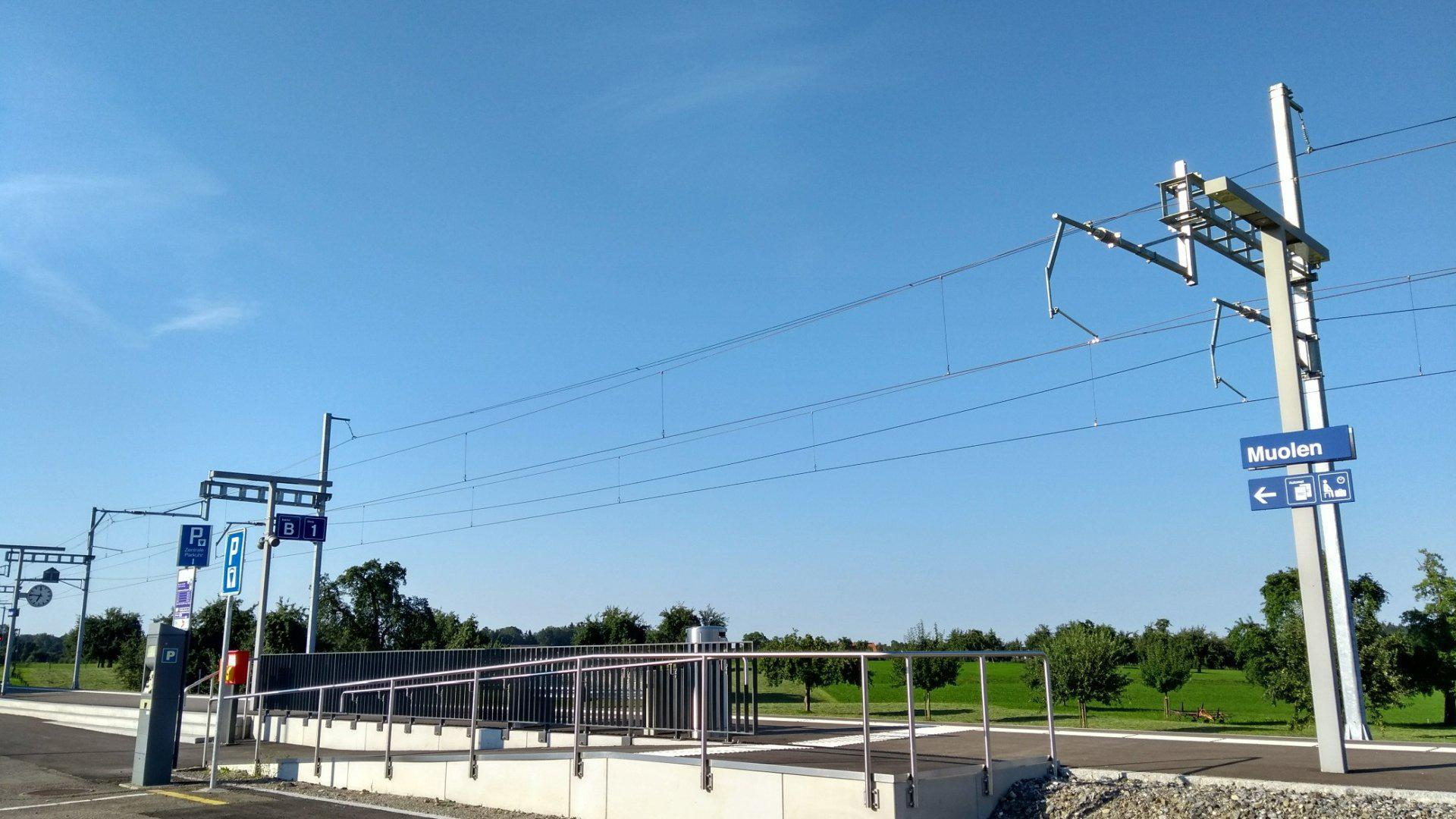
- The station platform in 2018

General information
- Location: Muolen; Switzerland
- Coordinates: 47°31′5″N 9°20′13″E
- Elevation: 479 m (1,572 ft)
- Owner: Südostbahn
- Line: Bodensee–Toggenburg line
- Train operators: Thurbo

Other information
- Fare zone: 228 (Tarifverbund Ostschweiz)

Services
Preceding station	St. Gallen S-Bahn	Following station
Steinebrunn towards Schaffhausen	S1	Häggenschwil-Winden towards Wil
Steinebrunn towards Romanshorn	SN72 Limited service	Häggenschwil-Winden towards Lichtensteig
Location
- Location within Switzerland Location within Canton of St. Gallen

Muolen railway station (German: Bahnhof Muolen) is a railway station in Muolen, in the Swiss canton of St. Gallen. It is an intermediate stop on the Bodensee–Toggenburg line and is served by local trains only.

== Services ==
Muolen is served by the S1 of the St. Gallen S-Bahn:

- S1: half-hourly service between Schaffhausen and Wil via St. Gallen.

During weekends, the station is served by a nighttime S-Bahn service (SN72), offered by Ostwind fare network, and operated by Thurbo for St. Gallen S-Bahn.

- St. Gallen S-Bahn SN72: hourly service to Romanshorn and to Lichtensteig, via St. Gallen.

== See also ==
- Bodensee S-Bahn
- Rail transport in Switzerland
