= Roggwil-Berg railway station =

Train station in Switzerland

Roggwil-Berg
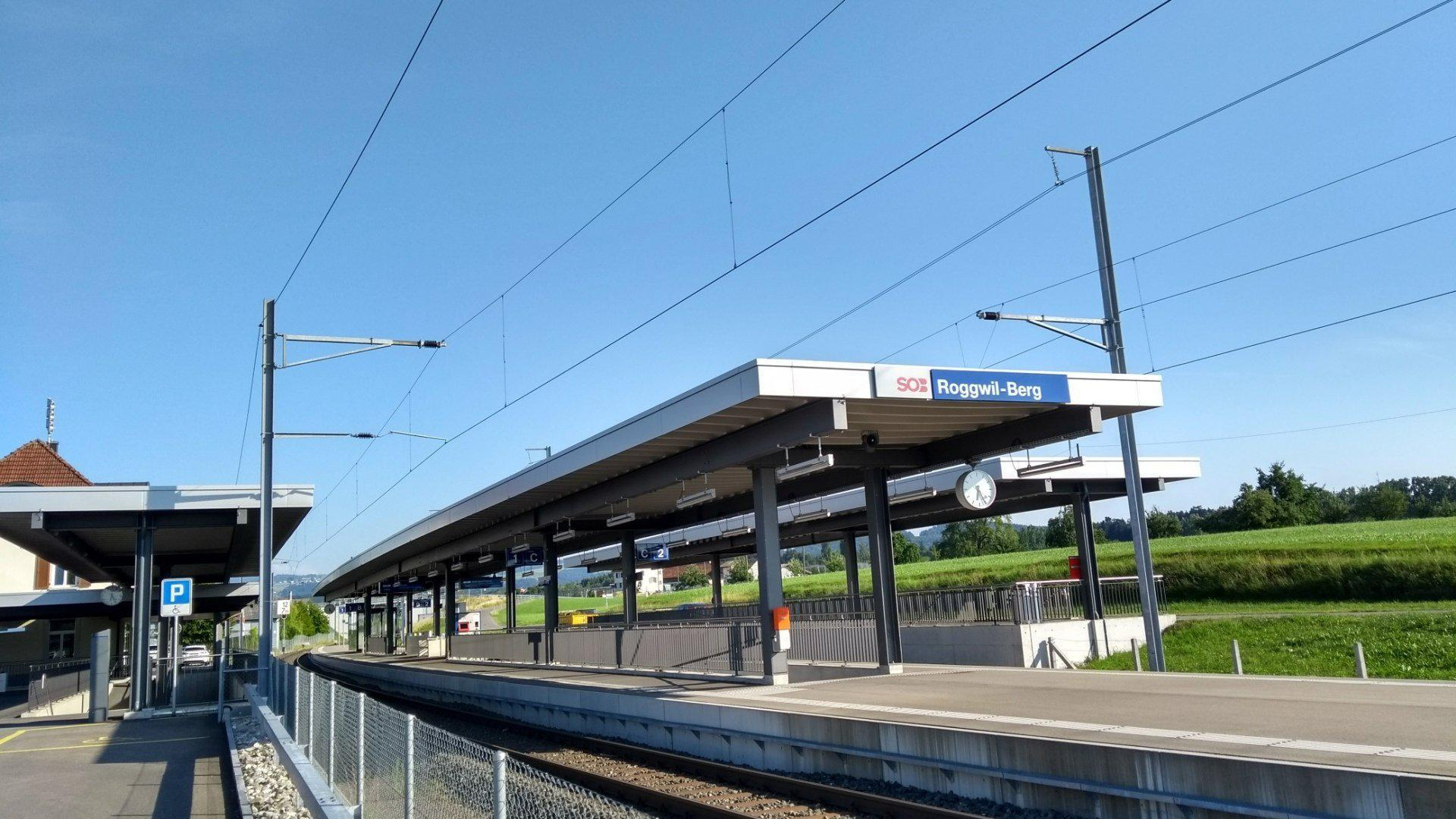
- The station in 2018

General information
- Location: Roggwil; Switzerland
- Coordinates: 47°29′10″N 9°23′31″E
- Elevation: 560 m (1,840 ft)
- Owner: Südostbahn
- Line: Bodensee–Toggenburg line
- Train operators: Thurbo

Other information
- Fare zone: 228 (Tarifverbund Ostschweiz)

Services
Preceding station	St. Gallen S-Bahn	Following station
Häggenschwil-Winden towards Schaffhausen	S1	Wittenbach towards Wil
Häggenschwil-Winden towards Romanshorn	SN72 Limited service	Wittenbach towards Lichtensteig
Location
- Location within Switzerland Location within Canton of Thurgau

Roggwil-Berg railway station (German: Bahnhof Roggwil-Berg) is a railway station in Roggwil, in the Swiss canton of Thurgau. The station sits just over the border from the Canton of St. Gallen, and its name comes from the Thurgau municipality of Roggwil and the nearby St. Gallen municipality of Berg. It is an intermediate stop on the Bodensee–Toggenburg line and is served as a request stop by local trains only.

== Services ==
Roggwil-Berg is served by the S1 of the St. Gallen S-Bahn:

- S1: half-hourly service between Schaffhausen and Wil via St. Gallen.

During weekends, the station is served by a nighttime S-Bahn service (SN72), offered by Ostwind fare network, and operated by Thurbo for St. Gallen S-Bahn.

- St. Gallen S-Bahn SN72: hourly service to Romanshorn and to Lichtensteig, via St. Gallen.

== See also ==
- Bodensee S-Bahn
- Rail transport in Switzerland
