= Häggenschwil =

- Municipality
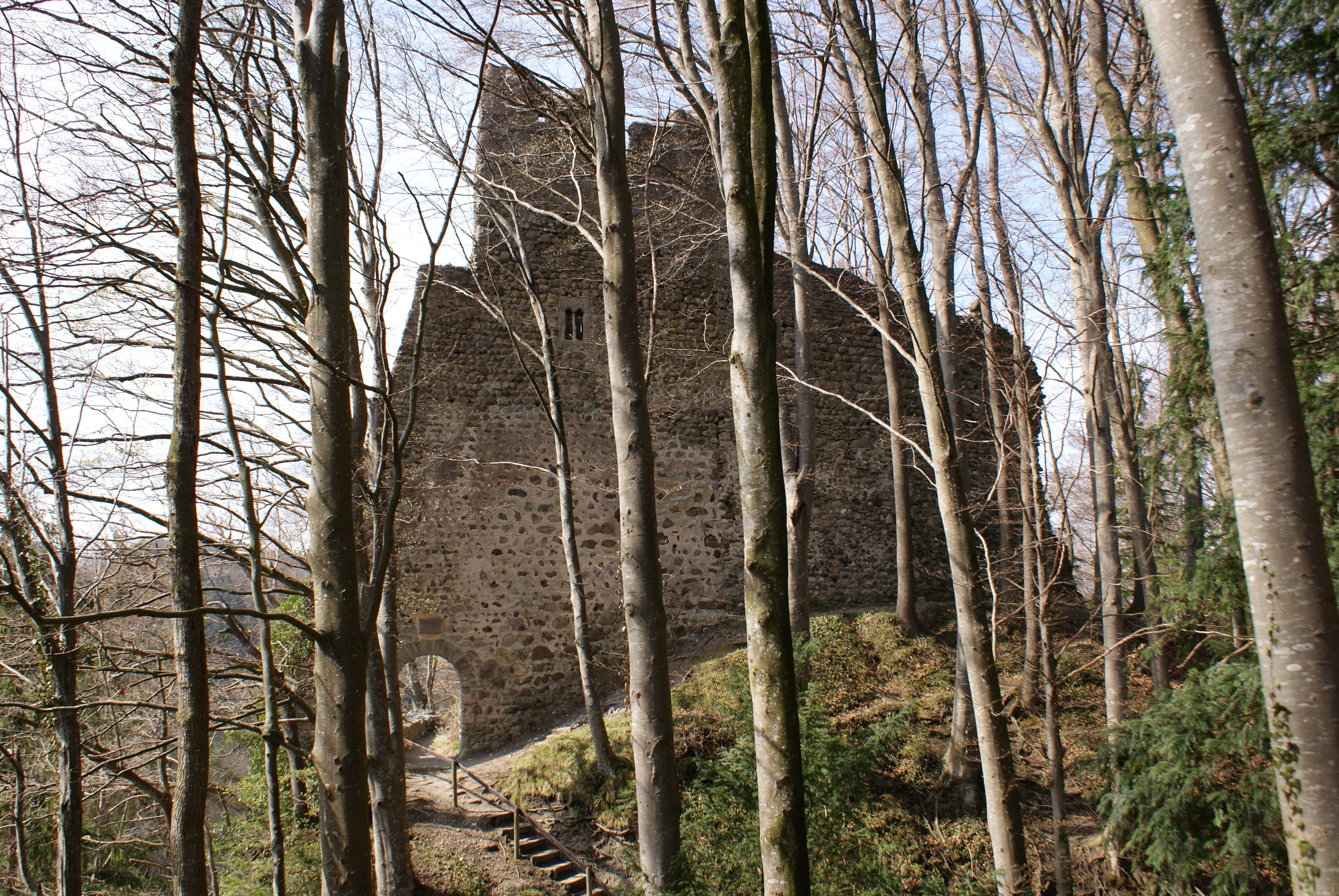

- Coat of arms
- Location of Häggenschwil
- Location within Switzerland Location within Canton of St. Gallen
- Coordinates: 47°29′N 9°21′E
- Country: Switzerland
- Canton: St. Gallen
- District: St. Gallen

Government
  - Mayor: Thomas Huber

Area
  - Total: 9.10 km^{2} (3.51 sq mi)
- Elevation: 565 m (1,854 ft)

Population (December 2020)
  - Total: 1,389
  - Density: 153/km^{2} (395/sq mi)
- Time zone: UTC+01:00 (CET)
  - Summer (DST): UTC+02:00 (CEST)
- Postal code: 9312
- SFOS number: 3201
- ISO 3166 code: CH-SG
- Surrounded by: Egnach (TG), Hauptwil-Gottshaus (TG), Muolen, Roggwil (TG), Waldkirch, Wittenbach, Zihlschlacht-Sitterdorf (TG)
- Website: www.haeggenschwil.ch

Häggenschwil is a municipality in the Wahlkreis (constituency) of St. Gallen in the canton of St. Gallen in Switzerland.

== History ==
Häggenschwil is first mentioned in 1419 as Hergnschwylen.

== Geography ==
Häggenschwil has an area, as of 2006, of 9.2 km^{2} (3.6 sq mi). Of this area, 75.4% is used for agricultural purposes, while 14% is forested. Of the rest of the land, 8.7% is settled (buildings or roads) and the remainder (1.9%) is non-productive (rivers or lakes).

The municipality is located in the St Gallen Wahlkreis. It consists of the settlements of Häggenschwil and Lömmenschwil as well as several small hamlets and the exclaves of Raach and Ruggisberg..

== Coat of arms ==
The blazon of the municipal coat of arms is Or two Leopards passant Gules crowned Argent.

== Demographics ==
Häggenschwil has a population (as of 31 December 2020) of 1,389. As of 2007, about 6.0% of the population was made up of foreign nationals. Of the foreign population, (as of 2000), 28 are from Germany, 8 are from Italy, 23 are from ex-Yugoslavia, 1 person is from Austria,1 person is from Turkey, and 20 are from another country. Over the last 10 years the population has grown at a rate of 9.9%. Most of the population (as of 2000) speaks German (96.9%), with Albanian being second most common ( 0.9%) and Arabic being third ( 0.6%). Of the Swiss national languages (as of 2000), 1,108 speak German, 1 person speaks, French, 3 people speak Italian, and 2 people speak Romansh.

The age distribution, as of 2000, in Häggenschwil is; 212 children or 18.5% of the population are between 0 and 9 years old and 197 teenagers or 17.2% are between 10 and 19. Of the adult population, 110 people or 9.6% of the population are between 20 and 29 years old. 220 people or 19.2% are between 30 and 39, 144 people or 12.6% are between 40 and 49, and 99 people or 8.7% are between 50 and 59. The senior population distribution is 69 people or 6.0% of the population are between 60 and 69 years old, 75 people or 6.6% are between 70 and 79, there are 16 people or 1.4% who are between 80 and 89, and there is 1 person who is between 90 and 99.

In 2000 there were 92 persons (or 8.0% of the population) who were living alone in a private dwelling. There were 158 (or 13.8%) persons who were part of a couple (married or otherwise committed) without children, and 781 (or 68.3%) who were part of a couple with children. There were 66 (or 5.8%) people who lived in single parent home, while there are 4 persons who were adult children living with one or both parents, 6 persons who lived in a household made up of relatives, 11 who lived household made up of unrelated persons, and 25 who are either institutionalized or live in another type of collective housing.

In the 2007 federal election the most popular party was the SVP which received 37.9% of the vote. The next three most popular parties were the CVP (34.7%), the FDP (10.5%) and the SP (7.5%).

The entire Swiss population is generally well educated. In Häggenschwil about 76.9% of the population (between age 25-64) have completed either non-mandatory upper secondary education or additional higher education (either university or a Fachhochschule). Out of the total population in Häggenschwil, as of 2000, the highest education level completed by 247 people (21.6% of the population) was Primary, while 379 (33.2%) have completed the Secondary level, 140 (12.2%) have attended a Tertiary school, and 30 (2.6%) are not in school. The remainder did not answer this question.

The historical population is given in the following table:

year	population
1808	1,049
1850	935
1900	926
1950	908
1980	787
2000	1,143

== Economy ==
As of 2007, Häggenschwil had an unemployment rate of 1.34%. As of 2005, there were 144 people employed in the primary economic sector and about 56 businesses involved in this sector. 51 people are employed in the secondary sector and there are 13 businesses in this sector. 98 people are employed in the tertiary sector, with 24 businesses in this sector.

As of October 2009 the average unemployment rate was 1.3%. There were 91 businesses in the municipality of which 12 were involved in the secondary sector of the economy while 27 were involved in the third.

As of 2000 there were 209 residents who worked in the municipality, while 334 residents worked outside Häggenschwil and 67 people commuted into the municipality for work.

== Transport ==
Häggenschwil sits on the Bodensee–Toggenburg line between Romanshorn and St. Gallen and is served by the St. Gallen S-Bahn at Häggenschwil-Winden railway station.

== Religion ==
From the 2000 census, 793 or 69.4% are Roman Catholic, while 203 or 17.8% belonged to the Swiss Reformed Church. Of the rest of the population, there is 1 individual who belongs to the Christian Catholic faith, there are 7 individuals (or about 0.61% of the population) who belong to the Orthodox Church, and there are 22 individuals (or about 1.92% of the population) who belong to another Christian church. There is 1 individual who is Jewish, and 18 (or about 1.57% of the population) who are Islamic. 72 (or about 6.30% of the population) belong to no church, are agnostic or atheist, and 26 individuals (or about 2.27% of the population) did not answer the question.
