= Muolen =

- Municipality
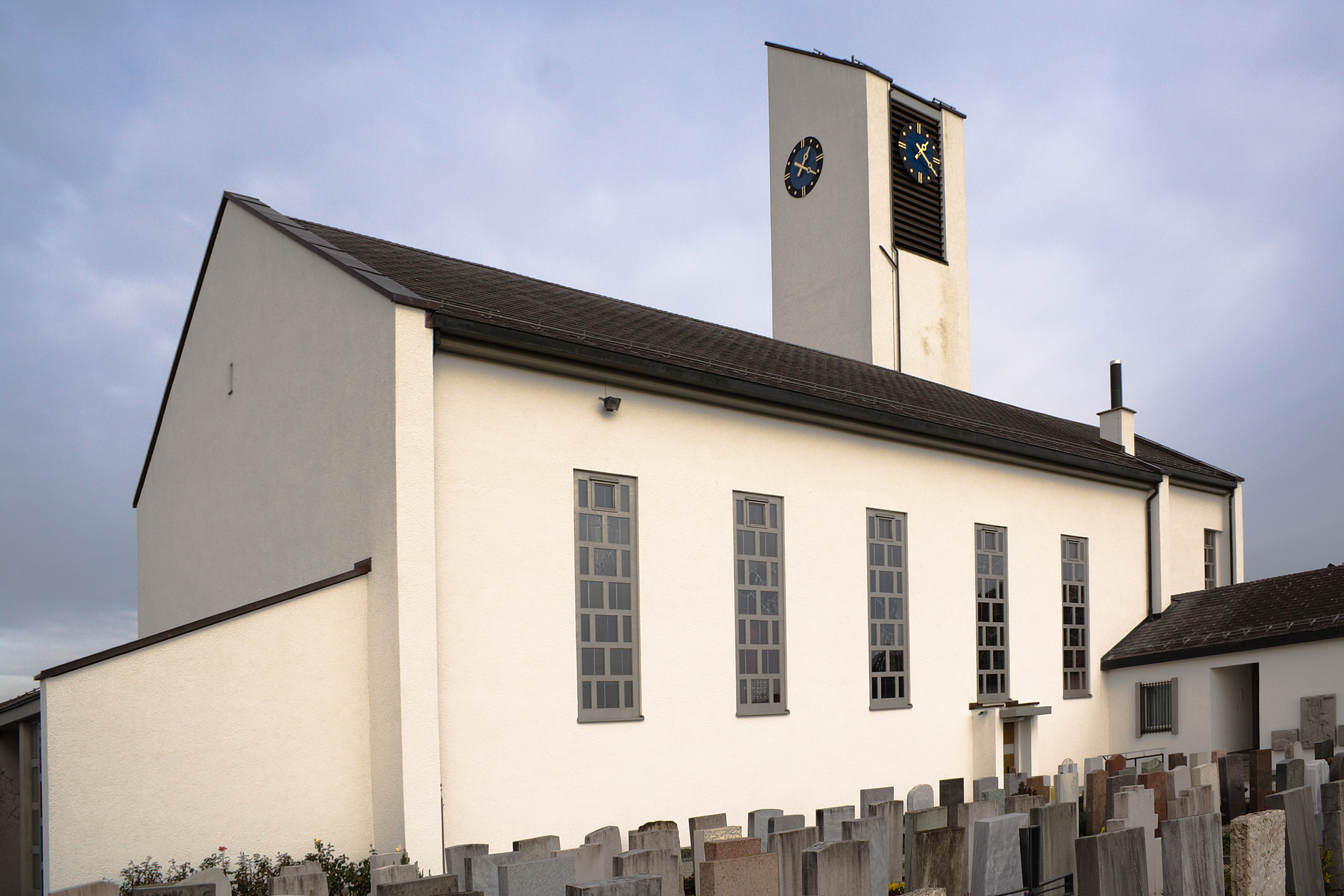

- Coat of arms
- Location of Muolen
- Location within Switzerland Location within Canton of St. Gallen
- Coordinates: 47°31′N 9°19′E
- Country: Switzerland
- Canton: St. Gallen
- District: St. Gallen

Government
  - Mayor: Bernhard Keller

Area
  - Total: 10.30 km^{2} (3.98 sq mi)
- Elevation: 490 m (1,610 ft)

Population (December 2020)
  - Total: 1,224
  - Density: 118.8/km^{2} (307.8/sq mi)
- Time zone: UTC+01:00 (CET)
  - Summer (DST): UTC+02:00 (CEST)
- Postal code: 9313
- SFOS number: 3202
- ISO 3166 code: CH-SG
- Surrounded by: Amriswil (TG), Egnach (TG), Häggenschwil, Hauptwil-Gottshaus (TG), Zihlschlacht-Sitterdorf (TG)
- Website: www.muolen.ch

Muolen is a municipality in the Wahlkreis (constituency) of St. Gallen in the canton of St. Gallen in Switzerland.

== History ==
Muolen is first mentioned in 1155 as Mola.

== Geography ==
Muolen has an area, as of 2006, of 10.3 km^{2} (4.0 sq mi). Of this area, 85.2% is used for agricultural purposes, while 7.7% is forested. Of the rest of the land, 7% is settled (buildings or roads) and the remainder (0.1%) is non-productive (rivers or lakes).

The municipality is located in the St Gallen Wahlkreis.. It is the northernmost municipality in the canton. It consists of the village of Muolen and multiple hamlets as well as part of the Hudelmoos, the last high moorland in the Fürstenland (a historic region comprising the Wahlkreises of Wil, St. Gallen and Rorschach).

Aerial view from 300 m by Walter Mittelholzer (1923)

== Coat of arms ==
The blazon of the municipal coat of arms is Per fess Or a Semi Mill-wheel Sable and vert a bar wavy Argent.

== Demographics ==
Muolen has a population (as of 31 December 2020) of 1,224. As of 2007, about 4.0% of the population was made up of foreign nationals. Of the foreign population, (as of 2000), 6 are from Germany, 11 are from Italy, 12 are from ex-Yugoslavia, 6 are from Austria, and 11 are from another country. Over the last 10 years the population has grown at a rate of 8.1%. Most of the population (as of 2000) speaks German (97.8%), with Italian being second most common ( 0.5%) and English being third ( 0.3%). Of the Swiss national languages (as of 2000), 1,050 speak German, 2 people speak French, 5 people speak Italian, and 1 person speaks Romansh.

The age distribution, as of 2000, in Muolen is; 164 children or 15.3% of the population are between 0 and 9 years old and 166 teenagers or 15.5% are between 10 and 19. Of the adult population, 133 people or 12.4% of the population are between 20 and 29 years old. 168 people or 15.6% are between 30 and 39, 150 people or 14.0% are between 40 and 49, and 119 people or 11.1% are between 50 and 59. The senior population distribution is 76 people or 7.1% of the population are between 60 and 69 years old, 65 people or 6.1% are between 70 and 79, there are 31 people or 2.9% who are between 80 and 89, and there are 2 people or 0.2% who are between 90 and 99.

In 2000 there were 72 persons (or 6.7% of the population) who were living alone in a private dwelling. There were 241 (or 22.4%) persons who were part of a couple (married or otherwise committed) without children, and 689 (or 64.2%) who were part of a couple with children. There were 32 (or 3.0%) people who lived in single parent home, while there are 12 persons who were adult children living with one or both parents, 9 persons who lived in a household made up of relatives, 10 who lived household made up of unrelated persons, and 9 who are either institutionalized or live in another type of collective housing.

In the 2007 federal election the most popular party was the CVP which received 38.5% of the vote. The next three most popular parties were the SVP (34.7%), the FDP (12.1%) and the SP (7.2%).

In Muolen about 73.7% of the population (between age 25-64) have completed either non-mandatory upper secondary education or additional higher education (either university or a Fachhochschule). Out of the total population in Muolen, as of 2000, the highest education level completed by 249 people (23.2% of the population) was Primary, while 369 (34.4%) have completed their secondary education, 116 (10.8%) have attended a Tertiary school, and 30 (2.8%) are not in school. The remainder did not answer this question.

The historical population is given in the following table:

year	population
1831	953
1850	983
1900	1,015
1950	1,027
2000	1,074

== Sights ==
The Kulturlandschaft Unteregg/Rotzenwil/Hueb (Cultural region Unteregg/Rotzenwil/Hueb) in the municipality is designated as part of the Inventory of Swiss Heritage Sites.

== Economy ==
As of 2007, Muolen had an unemployment rate of 1.14%. As of 2005, there were 166 people employed in the primary economic sector and about 69 businesses involved in this sector. 87 people are employed in the secondary sector and there are 20 businesses in this sector. 126 people are employed in the tertiary sector, with 24 businesses in this sector.

As of October 2009 the average unemployment rate was 0.5%. There were 114 businesses in the municipality of which 24 were involved in the secondary sector of the economy while 25 were involved in the third.

As of 2000 there were 224 residents who worked in the municipality, while 359 residents worked outside Muolen and 131 people commuted into the municipality for work.

== Religion ==
From the 2000 census, 747 or 69.6% are Roman Catholic, while 227 or 21.1% belonged to the Swiss Reformed Church. Of the rest of the population, there are 5 individuals (or about 0.47% of the population) who belong to the Orthodox Church, and there are 19 individuals (or about 1.77% of the population) who belong to another Christian church. There are 10 (or about 0.93% of the population) who are Islamic. There are 2 individuals (or about 0.19% of the population) who belong to another church (not listed on the census), 45 (or about 4.19% of the population) belong to no church, are agnostic or atheist, and 19 individuals (or about 1.77% of the population) did not answer the question.

== Transport ==
Muolen sits on the Bodensee–Toggenburg line between Romanshorn and St. Gallen and is served by the St. Gallen S-Bahn at Muolen railway station.
