= Gübsensee =

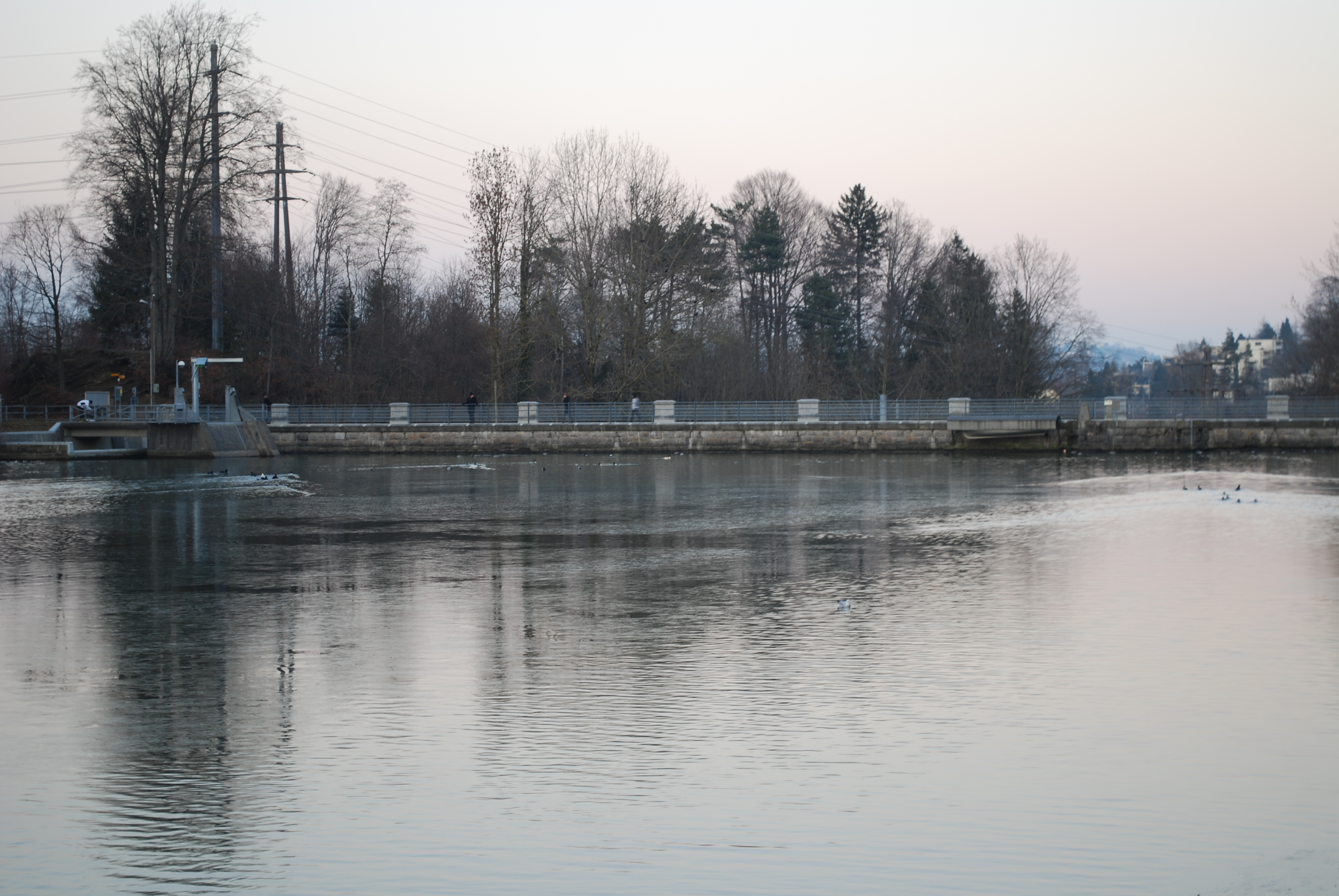

- Location within Canton of St. Gallen Location within Switzerland Location within Alps
- Interactive map of Gübsensee
- Location: St. Gallen
- Coordinates: 47°23′56″N 9°18′49″E
- Type: reservoir
- Primary outflows: Sitter
- Catchment area: 0.68 km^{2} (0.26 sq mi)
- Basin countries: Switzerland
- Surface area: 0.17 km^{2} (0.066 sq mi)
- Water volume: 1.5 million cubic metres (1,200 acre⋅ft)
- Surface elevation: 682 m (2,238 ft)

Gübsensee is a reservoir near the city of St. Gallen, Switzerland. Its dams were built between 1898 and 1900, the first hydroelectric reservoir in Switzerland. Kraftwerk Kubel has generated electrical power there since 1900.

Gübsensee Ost is a gravity dam with a height of 24 m, Gübsensee West an earthfill dam.

The lake's surface area is 0.17 km^{2} (0.066 sq mi). Its volume is 1.5 mio m³.

The Gübsensee and the surrounding area is today protected as a nature reserve
