= Egnach =

- Municipality
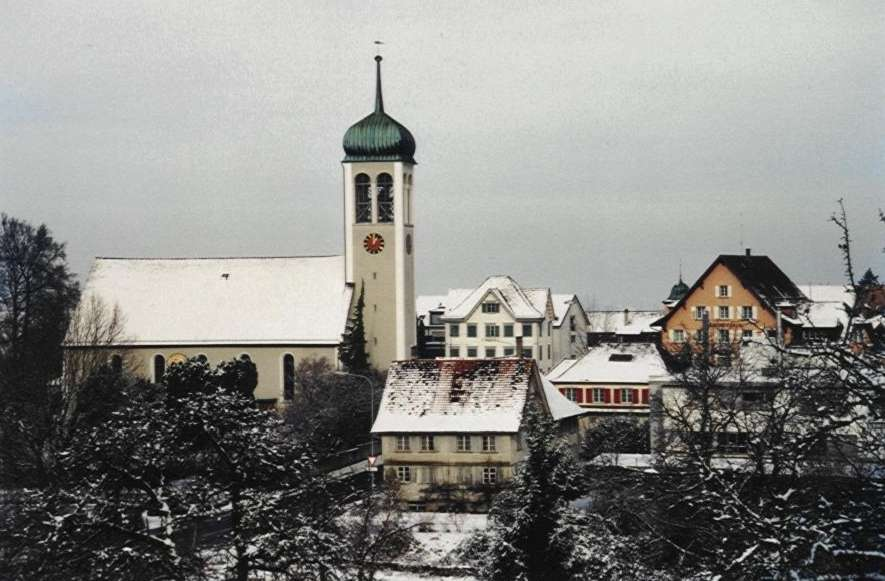
- Egnach village

- Flag Coat of arms
- Location of Egnach
- Location within Switzerland Location within Canton of Thurgau
- Coordinates: 47°33′N 9°23′E
- Country: Switzerland
- Canton: Thurgau
- District: Arbon

Area
  - Total: 18.42 km^{2} (7.11 sq mi)
- Elevation: 408 m (1,339 ft)

Population (December 2007)
  - Total: 4,272
  - Density: 231.9/km^{2} (600.7/sq mi)
- Time zone: UTC+01:00 (CET)
  - Summer (DST): UTC+02:00 (CEST)
- Postal code: 9322
- SFOS number: 4411
- ISO 3166 code: CH-TG
- Surrounded by: Amriswil, Arbon, Eriskirch (DE-BW), Friedrichshafen (DE-BW), Häggenschwil (SG), Muolen (SG), Roggwil, Salmsach
- Website: www.egnach.ch

Egnach is a municipality of the district of Arbon in the canton of Thurgau in Switzerland.

== History ==
Egnach is first mentioned in 1155 as Egena. By the 9th century it appears to have belonged to the Bishopric of Constance and was part of the upper Bailiwick of Arbon. The Abbey of Saint Gall acquired land in Egnach, which led to competing legal claims between abbot and bishop (which were settled in 854). During the Late Middle Ages it was a regional administrative center for lands of the Bishops of Constance. After the conquest of Thurgau by the Swiss Confederation in 1460, the new rulers replaced all the Bishop's representatives. While the low courts remained in the hands of the bishop until 1798, in 1509 he lost the rights to the high courts to the governor of Thurgau. In 1544 Egnach received a special lower court.

The village was part of parish of Arbon. In 1515 St James Chapel was built in Erdhausen, and after 1588 Reformed religious services were held in that chapel. The Gallus Chapel in Steinebrunn remained Catholic. In Neukirch (previously Mosershaus), the majority of the population joined the Reformed church in 1528 and in 1727 a Swiss Reformed parish church was built in the village. The Catholic inhabitants belong to the Catholic parish of Steinebrunn since 1872.

Egnach was divided into 13 Rotten, that took over education and many other duties of a community. In 1803, the municipality and Bürgergemeinde of Egnach was formed, with Neukirch as the center. In 1857 the Rotten of Feilen and Frasnacht separated from Egnach. Then, in 1858, Lengwil and Ballen came from the municipality of Roggwil over to Egnach. In 1870, the geographic municipality and the political municipality merged to form the combined municipality of Egnach.

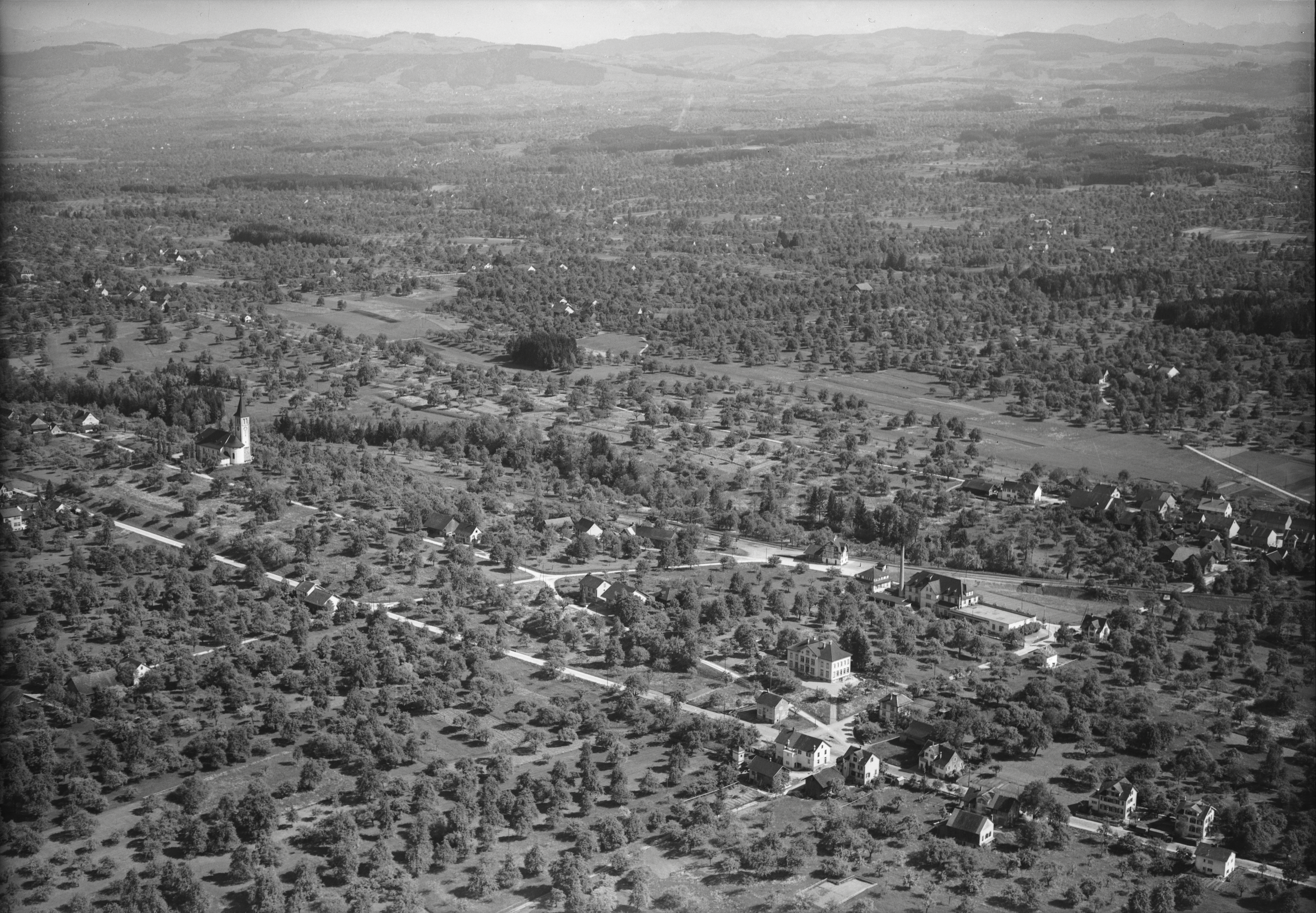
Aerial view (1949)

Already in the 18th century the region was home to numerous orchards, which caused the area around Egnach to be known as Mostindien or Cider. By 1850, the traditional crops were replaced by cattle and dairy farming. Various branches of textile production flourished in Egnach, in the early 19th century. The opening of the SBB line Romanshorn-Rorschach in 1869 and the Bodensee-Toggenburg-Bahn line in 1910, both of which passed through Egnach, brought economic growth. In 1900 a cider and fruit export cooperative was founded in the village.

By 2000, agriculture accounts for about one-fifth of the jobs, while manufacturing provides approximately one third of the jobs in Egnach. In spite of some industrial and residential areas, the village retains its rural character.

== Geography ==
Egnach has an area, as of 2009, of 18.42 square kilometers (7.11 sq mi). Of this area, 14.71 km^{2} (5.68 sq mi) or 79.9% is used for agricultural purposes, while 1.18 km^{2} (0.46 sq mi) or 6.4% is forested. Of the rest of the land, 2.32 km^{2} (0.90 sq mi) or 12.6% is settled (buildings or roads), 0.05 km^{2} (12 acres) or 0.3% is either rivers or lakes and 0.2 km^{2} (0.077 sq mi) or 1.1% is unproductive land.

Of the built up area, industrial buildings made up 7.3% of the total area while housing and buildings made up 0.9% and transportation infrastructure made up 0.1%. while parks, green belts and sports fields made up 3.8%. Out of the forested land, 3.5% of the total land area is heavily forested and 2.9% is covered with orchards or small clusters of trees. Of the agricultural land, 52.4% is used for growing crops, while 27.4% is used for orchards or vine crops. All the water in the municipality is flowing water.

The municipality is located in the Arbon district, and is a large and spread-out municipality along Lake Constance. It consists of the villages of Egnach, Neukirch and Steinebrunn and 61 hamlets or farm houses.

== Demographics ==
Egnach has a population (as of December 2020) of 4,789 As of 2008, 11.2% of the population are foreign nationals. Over the last 10 years (1997–2007) the population has changed at a rate of 9.3%. Most of the population (as of 2000) speaks German(93.0%), with Italian being second most common ( 1.6%) and Albanian being third ( 1.2%).

As of 2008, the gender distribution of the population was 50.8% male and 49.2% female. The population was made up of 1,896 Swiss men (44.7% of the population), and 259 (6.1%) non-Swiss men. There were 1,873 Swiss women (44.1%), and 215 (5.1%) non-Swiss women.

In 2008 there were 32 live births to Swiss citizens and 6 births to non-Swiss citizens, and in same time span there were 34 deaths of Swiss citizens. Ignoring immigration and emigration, the population of Swiss citizens decreased by 2 while the foreign population increased by 6. There were 2 Swiss men who emigrated from Switzerland to another country, 1 Swiss woman who emigrated from Switzerland to another country, 14 non-Swiss men who emigrated from Switzerland to another country and 9 non-Swiss women who emigrated from Switzerland to another country. The total Swiss population change in 2008 (from all sources) was a decrease of 44 and the non-Swiss population change was an increase of 7 people. This represents a population growth rate of -0.9%.

The age distribution, as of 2009, in Egnach is; 471 children or 11.0% of the population are between 0 and 9 years old and 614 teenagers or 14.4% are between 10 and 19. Of the adult population, 521 people or 12.2% of the population are between 20 and 29 years old. 525 people or 12.3% are between 30 and 39, 755 people or 17.7% are between 40 and 49, and 565 people or 13.2% are between 50 and 59. The senior population distribution is 410 people or 9.6% of the population are between 60 and 69 years old, 252 people or 5.9% are between 70 and 79, there are 134 people or 3.1% who are between 80 and 89, and there are 30 people or 0.7% who are 90 and older.

As of 2000, there were 1,469 private households in the municipality, and an average of 2.7 persons per household. In 2000 there were 686 single family homes (or 83.8% of the total) out of a total of 819 inhabited buildings. There were 68 two family buildings (8.3%), 26 three family buildings (3.2%) and 39 multi-family buildings (or 4.8%). There were 880 (or 21.2%) persons who were part of a couple without children, and 2,490 (or 60.0%) who were part of a couple with children. There were 145 (or 3.5%) people who lived in single parent home, while there are 26 persons who were adult children living with one or both parents, 6 persons who lived in a household made up of relatives, 27 who lived in a household made up of unrelated persons, and 221 who are either institutionalized or live in another type of collective housing.

The vacancy rate for the municipality, in 2008, was 1.98%. As of 2007, the construction rate of new housing units was 1.9 new units per 1000 residents. In 2000 there were 1,597 apartments in the municipality. The most common apartment size was the 6 room apartment of which there were 418. There were 29 single room apartments and 418 apartments with six or more rooms.

As of 2000 the average price to rent an average apartment in Egnach was 1075.90 Swiss francs (CHF) per month (US$860, £480, €690 approx. exchange rate from 2000). The average rate for a one-room apartment was 586.22 CHF (US$470, £260, €380), a two-room apartment was about 714.49 CHF (US$570, £320, €460), a three-room apartment was about 897.29 CHF (US$720, £400, €570) and a six or more room apartment cost an average of 1254.48 CHF (US$1000, £560, €800). The average apartment price in Egnach was 96.4% of the national average of 1116 CHF.

In the 2007 federal election the most popular party was the SVP which received 45.75% of the vote. The next three most popular parties were the CVP (13.34%), the SP (12.25%) and the FDP (11.09%). In the federal election, a total of 1,492 votes were cast, and the voter turnout was 50.3%.

The historical population is given in the following table:

year	population
1850	3,344
1860	2,622
1900	2,755
1910	3,166
1950	3,301
2000	4,153

== Heritage sites of national significance ==
The Bohlenständer House, and Farm House Schär with Granary mit Speicher are listed as Swiss heritage site of national significance. The village of Steinebrunn and the Kulturlandschaft of Balgen are part of the Inventory of Swiss Heritage Sites.

== Economy ==
As of 2007, Egnach had an unemployment rate of 1.59%. As of 2005, there were 450 people employed in the primary economic sector and about 132 businesses involved in this sector. 745 people are employed in the secondary sector and there are 76 businesses in this sector. 690 people are employed in the tertiary sector, with 115 businesses in this sector.

In 2000 there were 2,856 workers who lived in the municipality. Of these, 1,211 or about 42.4% of the residents worked outside Egnach while 837 people commuted into the municipality for work. There were a total of 2,482 jobs (of at least 6 hours per week) in the municipality. Of the working population, 9% used public transportation to get to work, and 45.2% used a private car.

== Religion ==
From the 2000 census, 1,283 or 30.9% were Roman Catholic, while 2,168 or 52.2% belonged to the Swiss Reformed Church. Of the rest of the population, there was 1 Old Catholic who belonged to the Christian Catholic Church of Switzerland there are 31 individuals (or about 0.75% of the population) who belong to the Orthodox Church, and there are 121 individuals (or about 2.91% of the population) who belong to another Christian church. There was 1 individual who was Jewish, and 146 (or about 3.52% of the population) who are Islamic. There are 21 individuals (or about 0.51% of the population) who belong to another church (not listed on the census), 275 (or about 6.62% of the population) belong to no church, are agnostic or atheist, and 106 individuals (or about 2.55% of the population) did not answer the question.

== Transport ==
Egnach is served by the St. Gallen S-Bahn over two lines calling at three stations: Egnach, Neukirch-Egnach, and Steinebrunn.

== Education ==
The entire Swiss population is generally well educated. In Egnach about 74.5% of the population (between age 25–64) have completed either non-mandatory upper secondary education or additional higher education (either university or a Fachhochschule).
