= Schachen (Herisau) railway station =

Train station in Switzerland

Schachen (Herisau)
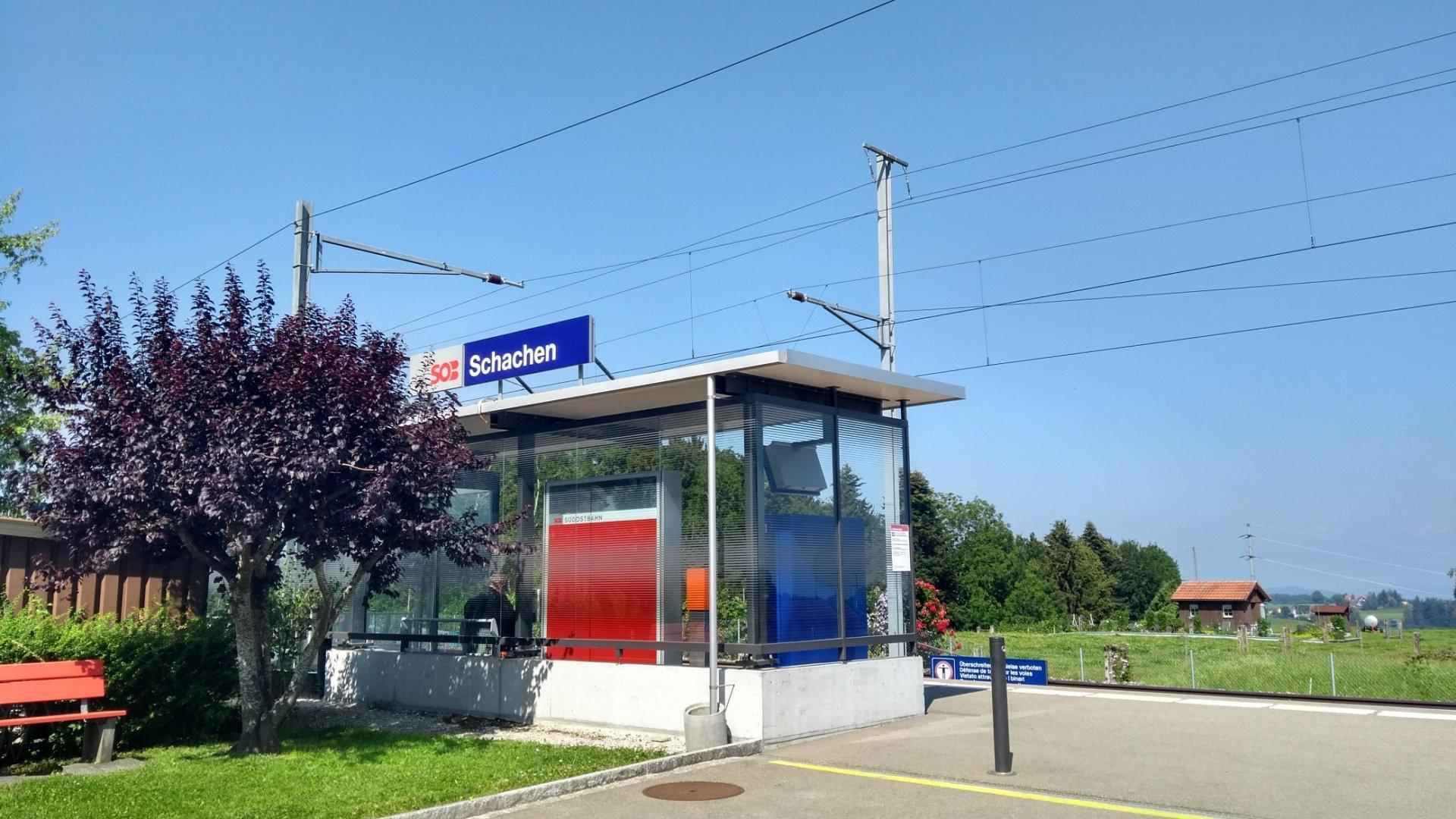
- The station platform in 2018

General information
- Location: Herisau; Switzerland
- Coordinates: 47°23′10″N 9°14′38″E
- Elevation: 789 m (2,589 ft)
- Owner: Südostbahn
- Line: Bodensee–Toggenburg
- Train operators: Thurbo; Südostbahn

Other information
- Fare zone: 213 (Tarifverbund Ostwind)

Services
Preceding station	St. Gallen S-Bahn	Following station
Degersheim towards Nesslau-Neu St. Johann	S2	Herisau towards Altstätten SG
Degersheim towards Rapperswil	S4	Herisau towards Sargans
Degersheim towards Lichtensteig	SN72 Limited service	Herisau towards Romanshorn
Location
- Location within Switzerland Location within Canton of Appenzell Ausserrhoden

Schachen (Herisau) railway station (German: Bahnhof Schachen (Herisau)) is a railway station in Herisau, in the Swiss canton of Appenzell Ausserrhoden. It is an intermediate station on the Bodensee–Toggenburg railway and is served as a request stop by local trains only.

== Services ==
As of the December 2023 timetable change, the following services stop at Schachen (Herisau):

- St. Gallen S-Bahn S2 / S4: half-hourly service between Wattwil and Altstätten SG via St. Gallen and hourly service to Rapperswil, Sargans, and Nesslau-Neu St. Johann.

On weekends (Friday and Saturday nights), there is also a nighttime S-Bahn services (SN72) offered by the Ostwind tariff network.

- SN72: hourly service to Lichtensteig and to Romanshorn, via St. Gallen.

== See also ==
- Rail transport in Switzerland
