= Degersheim railway station =

Railway station in St. Gallen, Switzerland

Degersheim
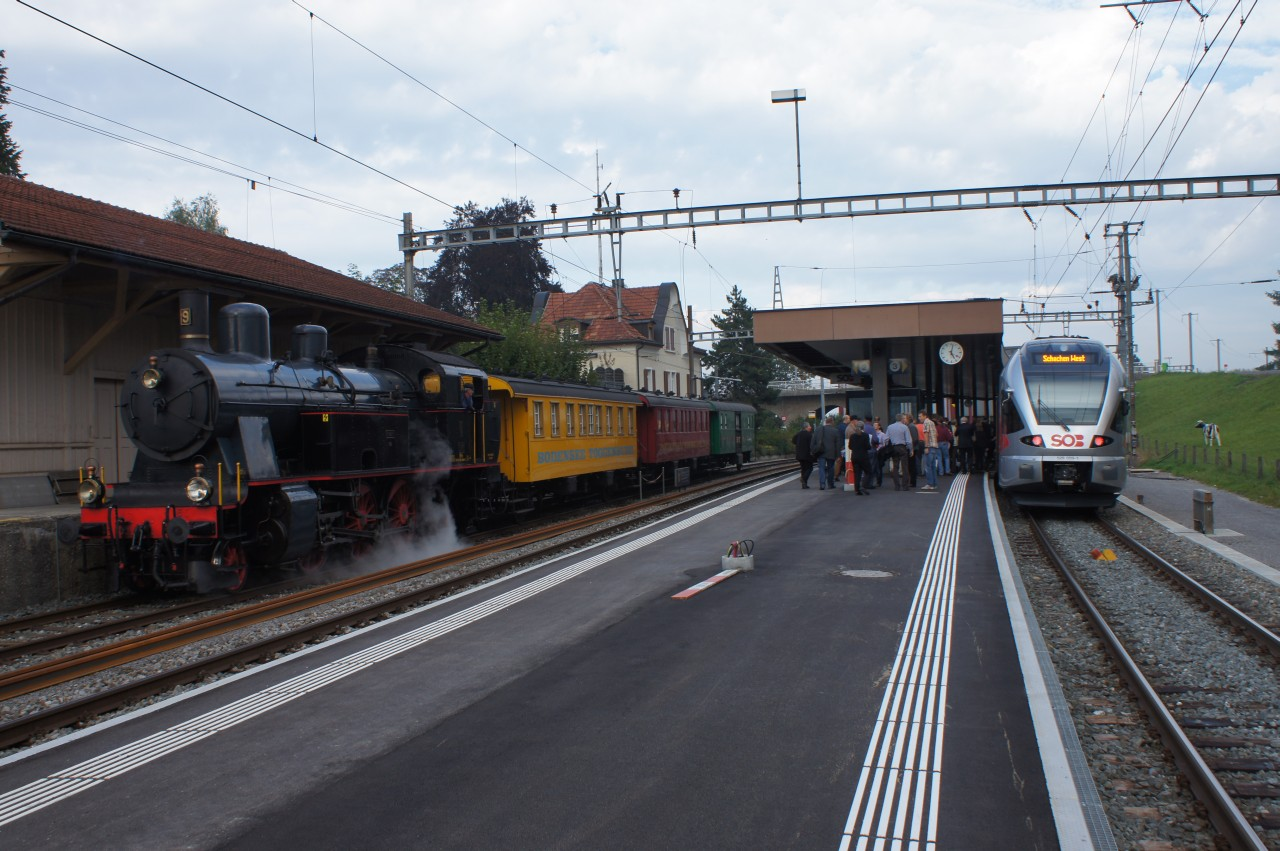
- A preserved steam locomotive at Degersheim in 2013

General information
- Location: Degersheim; Switzerland
- Coordinates: 47°22′19″N 9°12′00″E
- Elevation: 799 m (2,621 ft)
- Owner: Südostbahn
- Line: Bodensee–Toggenburg
- Train operators: Thurbo; Südostbahn

Other information
- Fare zone: 272 (Tarifverbund Ostwind)

Services
Preceding station	St. Gallen S-Bahn	Following station
Mogelsberg towards Nesslau-Neu St. Johann	S2	Schachen (Herisau) towards Altstätten SG
Mogelsberg towards Rapperswil	S4	Schachen (Herisau) towards Sargans
Mogelsberg towards Lichtensteig	SN72 Limited service	Schachen (Herisau) towards Romanshorn
Location
- Location within Switzerland Location within Canton of St. Gallen

Degersheim railway station (German: Bahnhof Degersheim) is a railway station in Degersheim, in the Swiss canton of St. Gallen. It is an intermediate station on the Bodensee–Toggenburg railway and is served by local trains only.

== Services ==
As of the December 2023 timetable change, the following services stop at Degersheim:

- St. Gallen S-Bahn S2 / S4: half-hourly service between Wattwil and Altstätten SG via St. Gallen and hourly service to Rapperswil, Sargans, and Nesslau-Neu St. Johann.

On weekends (Friday and Saturday nights), there is also a nighttime S-Bahn service (SN72) offered by the Ostwind tariff network.

- SN72: hourly service to Lichtensteig and to Romanshorn, via St. Gallen.

== See also ==
- Rail transport in Switzerland
