= Mogelsberg railway station =

Train station in Switzerland

Mogelsberg
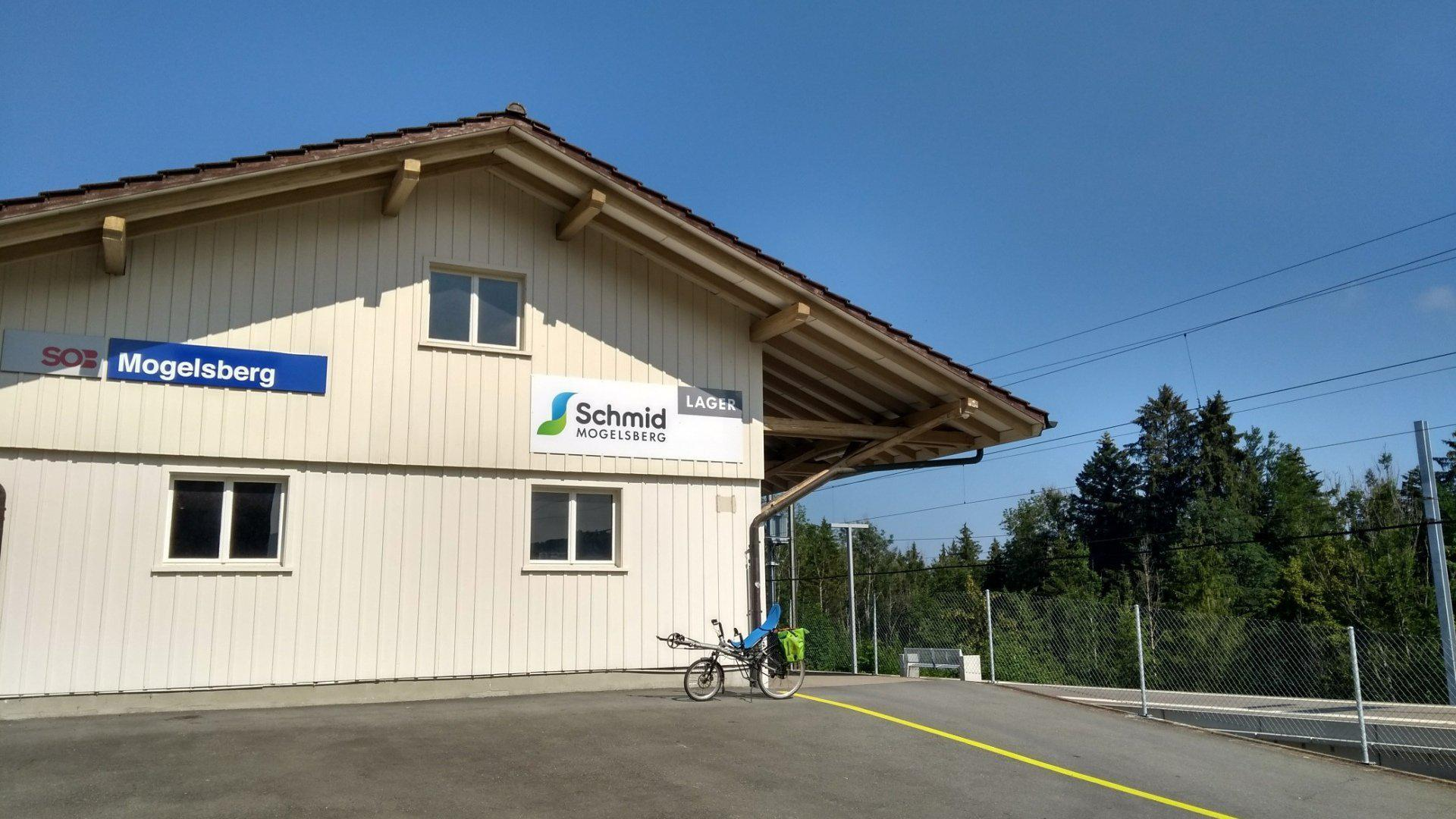
- The Mogelsberg station building in 2018

General information
- Location: Mogelsberg; Switzerland
- Coordinates: 47°21′50″N 9°08′35″E
- Elevation: 715 m (2,346 ft)
- Owner: Südostbahn
- Line: Bodensee–Toggenburg
- Train operators: Thurbo; Südostbahn

Services
Preceding station	St. Gallen S-Bahn	Following station
Brunnadern-Neckertal towards Nesslau-Neu St. Johann	S2	Degersheim towards Altstätten SG
Brunnadern-Neckertal towards Rapperswil	S4	Degersheim towards Sargans
Brunnadern-Neckertal towards Lichtensteig	SN72 Limited service	Degersheim towards Romanshorn
Location
- Location within Switzerland Location within Canton of St. Gallen

Mogelsberg railway station (German: Bahnhof Mogelsberg) is a railway station in Mogelsberg, in the Swiss canton of St. Gallen. It is an intermediate station on the Bodensee–Toggenburg railway and is served as a request stop by local trains only.

== Services ==
As of the December 2023 timetable change, the following services stop at Mogelsberg:

- St. Gallen S-Bahn S2 / S4: half-hourly service between Wattwil and Altstätten SG via St. Gallen and hourly service to Rapperswil, Sargans, and Nesslau-Neu St. Johann.

On weekends (Friday and Saturday nights), there is also a nighttime S-Bahn services (SN72) offered by the Ostwind tariff network.

- SN72: hourly service to Lichtensteig and to Romanshorn, via St. Gallen.

== See also ==
- Rail transport in Switzerland
