= Brunnadern-Neckertal railway station =

Train station in Switzerland

Brunnadern-Neckertal
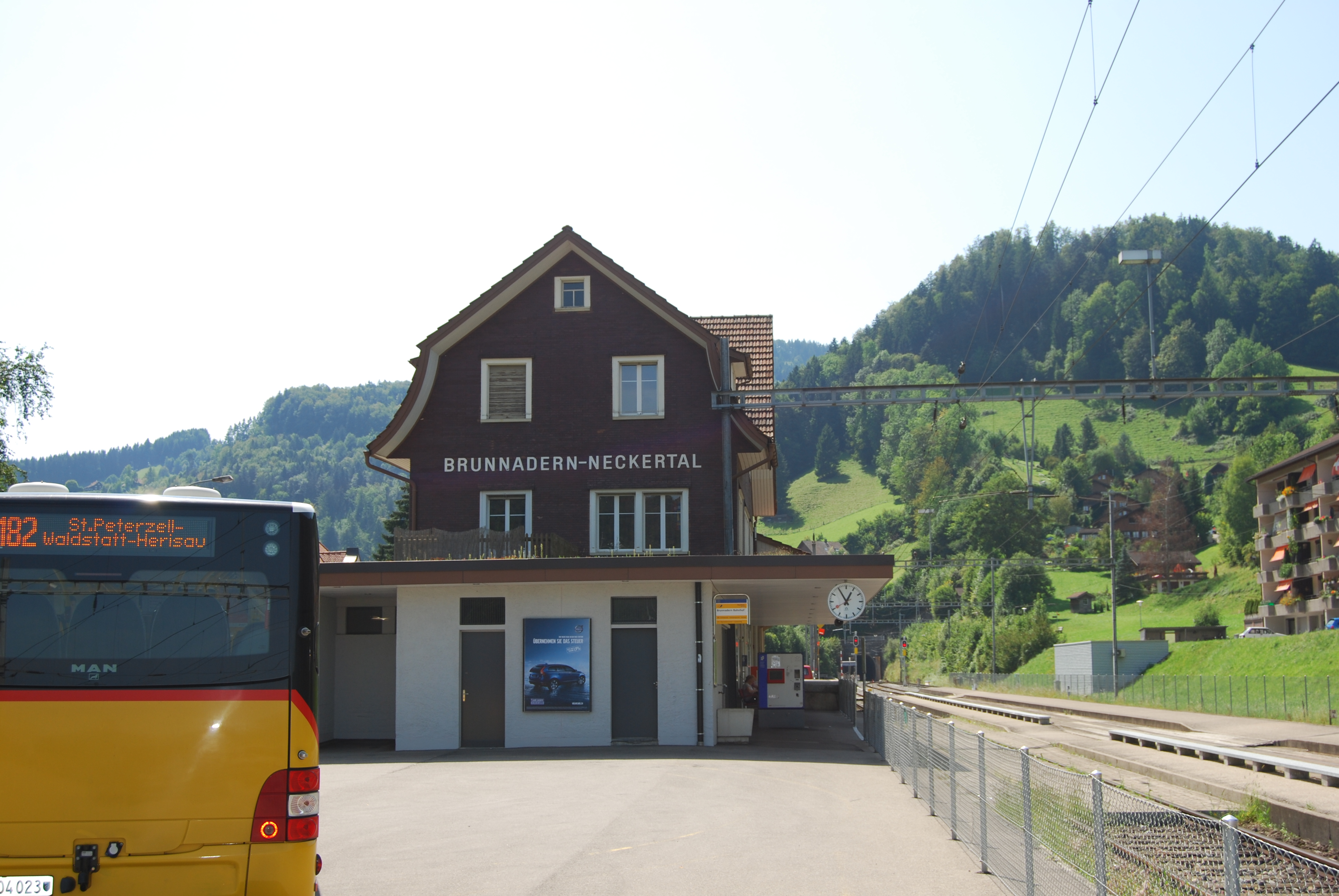
- The Brunnadern-Neckertal station building in 2011

General information
- Location: Brunnadern; Switzerland
- Coordinates: 47°20′13″N 9°07′48″E
- Elevation: 654 m (2,146 ft)
- Owner: Südostbahn
- Line: Bodensee–Toggenburg
- Platforms: 1 island platform
- Tracks: 3
- Train operators: Thurbo; Südostbahn

Other information
- Fare zone: 273 (Tarifverbund Ostwind)

Services
Preceding station	St. Gallen S-Bahn	Following station
Lichtensteig towards Nesslau-Neu St. Johann	S2	Mogelsberg towards Altstätten SG
Lichtensteig towards Rapperswil	S4	Mogelsberg towards Sargans
Lichtensteig Terminus	SN72 Limited service	Mogelsberg towards Romanshorn
Location
- Location within Switzerland Location within Canton of St. Gallen

Brunnadern-Neckertal railway station (German: Bahnhof Brunnadern-Neckertal) is a railway station in Brunnadern, in the Swiss canton of St. Gallen. It is an intermediate station on the Bodensee–Toggenburg railway and is served as a request stop by local trains only.

== Services ==
As of the December 2023 timetable change, the following services stop at Brunnadern-Neckertal:

- St. Gallen S-Bahn S2 / S4: half-hourly service between Wattwil and Altstätten SG via St. Gallen and hourly service to Rapperswil, Sargans, and Nesslau-Neu St. Johann.

On weekends (Friday and Saturday nights), there is also a nighttime S-Bahn services (SN72) offered by the Ostwind tariff network.

- SN72: hourly service to Lichtensteig and to Romanshorn, via St. Gallen.

== See also ==
- Rail transport in Switzerland
