= Herisau railway station =

Train station in Switzerland

Herisau
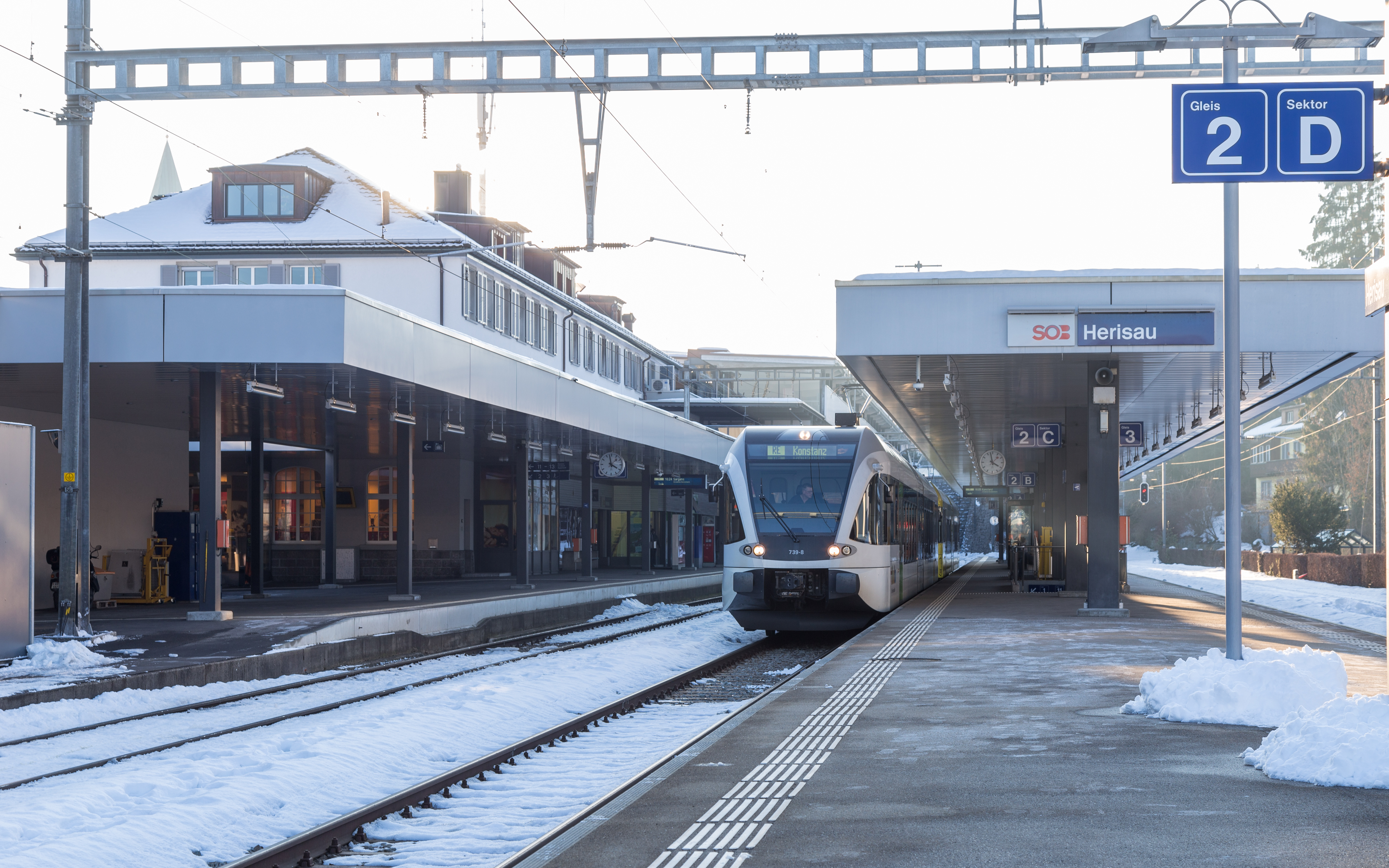
- Thurbo train No. 739 as RE1 service to Konstanz at Herisau in 2019

General information
- Location: Herisau, Appenzell Ausserrhoden; Switzerland
- Coordinates: 47°23′25″N 9°16′36″E
- Elevation: 745 m (2,444 ft)
- Owner: Südostbahn; Appenzell Railways
- Lines: Bodensee–Toggenburg line; Gossau–Wasserauen line
- Distance: 5.0 km (3.1 mi) from Gossau SG; 29.7 km (18.5 mi) from Romanshorn
- Platforms: 2 island platforms; 2 side platforms
- Tracks: 6
- Train operators: Thurbo; Südostbahn; Appenzell Railways
- Connections: Regiobus bus lines

Other information
- Fare zone: 213 (Tarifverbund Ostwind)

History
- Opened: 1 October 1910

Services
Preceding station	Südostbahn	Following station
Wattwil towards Lucerne	Voralpen Express	St. Gallen Terminus
Preceding station	St. Gallen S-Bahn	Following station
Schachen (Herisau) towards Nesslau-Neu St. Johann	S2	St. Gallen Haggen towards Altstätten SG
Schachen (Herisau) towards Rapperswil	S4	St. Gallen Haggen towards Sargans
Gossau SG Terminus	S23	Wilen towards Wasserauen
Terminus	S81	St. Gallen Haggen towards St. Gallen
Schachen (Herisau) towards Lichtensteig	SN72 Limited service	St. Gallen towards Romanshorn
Preceding station	Thurbo	Following station
Terminus	RE1	St. Gallen towards Konstanz
Location
- Location within Switzerland Location within Canton of Appenzell Ausserrhoden

Herisau railway station (German: Bahnhof Herisau) is a railway station in Herisau, in the Swiss canton of Appenzell Ausserrhoden. It is an intermediate station on the 1,435 mm (4 ft 8 1/2 in) standard gauge Bodensee–Toggenburg line of Südostbahn and the 1,000 mm (3 ft 3 3/8 in) metre gauge Gossau–Wasserauen line of Appenzell Railways. Both companies have separate tracks and facilities, separated by Bahnhofplatz.

== Layout ==
Herisau serves both the east–west 1,435 mm (4 ft 8 1/2 in) standard gauge Bodensee–Toggenburg line of Südostbahn (SOB) and the north–south 1,000 mm (3 ft 3 3/8 in) metre gauge Gossau–Wasserauen line of Appenzell Railways (AB). SOB has two platforms serving three tracks (Nos. 1–3) on the north side of Bahnhofplatz. AB is similarly situated, with two platforms serving tracks 11–13 south of Bahnhofplatz.

A major project is underway to improve access to the station and redevelop parts of the site. This project will shift the Appenzell Railways tracks and platforms a short distance to the south, permitting the construction of a new bus loading area off Bahnhofplatz. Besides affording greater capacity, this loading area will be handicap-accessible. Traffic congestion will be further reduced by the construction of a roundabout at the intersection of Bahnhofplatz and Bahnhofstrasse, just west of the station. Construction work began in January 2021; it is estimated that the entire project will be complete by 2028.

== Services ==
As of the December 2023 timetable change, the following services stop at Herisau (most regional services are part of the Bodensee S-Bahn):

- IR Voralpen-Express: hourly service over the Bodensee–Toggenburg line between Lucerne and St. Gallen.
- RegioExpress RE1: hourly service over the Bodensee–Toggenburg line to Konstanz.
- St. Gallen S-Bahn:
  - S2 / S4: half-hourly service between Wattwil and Altstätten SG via St. Gallen and hourly service to Rapperswil, Sargans, and Nesslau-Neu St. Johann.
  - S23: half-hourly service over the Gossau–Wasserauen line between Gossau SG and Wasserauen.
  - S81: hourly service over the Bodensee–Toggenburg line to St. Gallen.

The S2 and S4 combine for half-hourly service between Wattwil and Altstätten SG; the various services on the Bodensee–Toggenburg line provide one train approximately every 11 minutes between Herisau and St. Gallen.

On weekends (Friday and Saturday nights), there is also a nighttime S-Bahn service (SN72) offered by the Ostwind tariff network.

- SN72: hourly service to Lichtensteig and to Romanshorn, via St. Gallen.

== See also ==
- Bodensee S-Bahn
- Rail transport in Switzerland
