= Bodensee S-Bahn =

Commuter rail services around Lake Constance

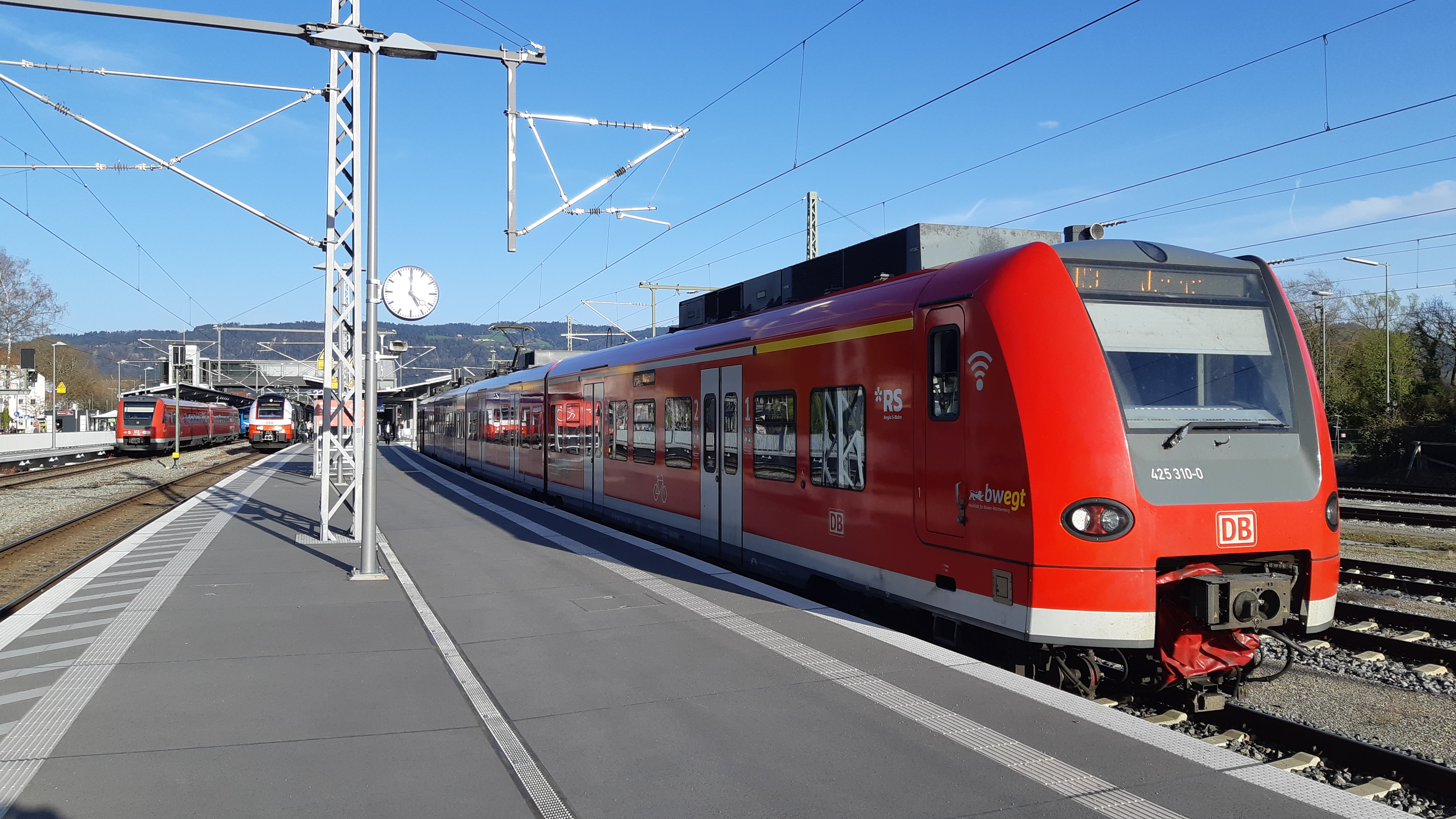
- Regional trains from Austria, Germany and Switzerland

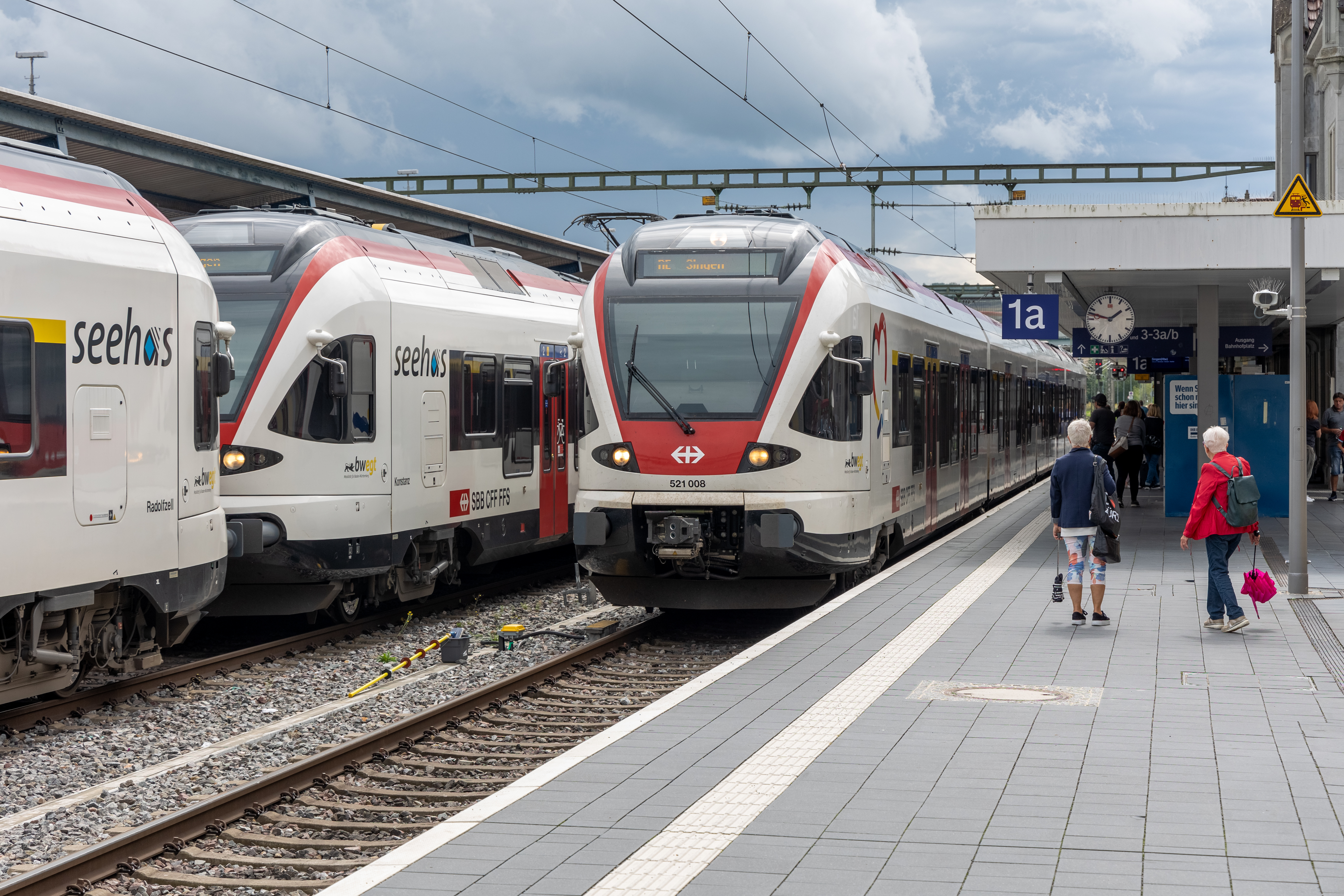

Overview
- Locale: Lake Constance (Bodensee)
- Transit type: S-Bahn (S#), Regionalbahn (RB#), Regionalzug (R#), RegioExpress (RE#), Regional-Express (RE# / REX#)
- Number of lines: 30
- Website: Official website (in English)

Operation
- Operators: Appenzell Railways; Austrian Federal Railways; Bodensee-Oberschwaben-Bahn; DB Regio Baden-Württemberg; DB Regio Bayern; Arverio; SBB GmbH; SWEG Südwestdeutsche Landesverkehrs-AG; Südostbahn; Thurbo

Bodensee S-Bahn is an international marketing effort grouping various regional rail services (S-Bahn, R, RB, RE, RE/REX) around Lake Constance (German: Bodensee) in Austria, Germany and Switzerland. Cross-border rail and bus services along with Lake Constance ferries (Friedrichshafen–Romanshorn, Konstanz–Meersburg) can be used with the Bodensee Ticket.

== Services ==
With a few exceptions, most services marketed as part of the Bodensee S-Bahn belong to other S-Bahn networks. Services use the railway lines of the Lake Constance Belt Railway (Bodenseegürtelbahn) and connecting lines.

As of April 2024, the following services are part of Bodensee S-Bahn (railway stations in bold are included in the Bodensee-S-Bahn network, others are not):

#	Route	Network	Operator
S1	**Lindau-Insel – Bregenz – Dornbirn – Feldkirch – Bludenz**	Vorarlberg S-Bahn	ÖBB
S1	**Schaffhausen – Stein am Rhein – Kreuzlingen – Romanshorn – St. Gallen – Gossau – Flawil – Uzwil – Wil**	St. Gallen S-Bahn	Thurbo
S2	Nesslau-Neu St. Johann – Wattwil – **Herisau – St. Gallen – Rorschach – Altstätten SG**	St. Gallen S-Bahn	Thurbo
S3	**Bregenz – St. Margrethen**	Vorarlberg S-Bahn	ÖBB
S4	Sargans – Buchs SG – **Altstätten SG – St. Gallen – Herisau** – Wattwil – Uznach – Rapperswil	St. Gallen S-Bahn	SOB
S5	**Weinfelden – Gossau – St. Gallen – Rorschach – St. Margrethen**	St. Gallen S-Bahn	Thurbo
S6	**Konstanz – Radolfzell – Singen (Hohentwiel) – Engen**	—	SBB GmbH
S7/REX7	**(Weinfelden – ) Romanshorn – Rorschach ( – Bregenz – Lindau-Reutin)**	St. Gallen S-Bahn	Thurbo
S10	**Wil – Weinfelden – Romanshorn**	St. Gallen S-Bahn	Thurbo
S14	**Weinfelden – Kreuzlingen – Konstanz**	St. Gallen S-Bahn	Thurbo
S21	**Appenzell – Gais – Bühler – Teufen AR – St. Gallen – Speicher – Trogen**	St. Gallen S-Bahn	AB
S23	**Gossau – Herisau – Urnäsch – Appenzell – Wasserauen**	St. Gallen S-Bahn	AB
S24	**Altstätten Stadt – Gais**	St. Gallen S-Bahn	AB
S25	**Rorschach Hafen – Rorschach – Heiden**	St. Gallen S-Bahn	AB
S26	**Rheineck – Walzenhausen**	St. Gallen S-Bahn	AB
S44	**Weinfelden – Kreuzlingen – Konstanz**	St. Gallen S-Bahn	Thurbo
S 61	**Radolfzell – Stockach**	—	SWEG
S62	**Schaffhausen – Singen (Hohentwiel)**	Schaffhausen S-Bahn	SBB GmbH
R5	**(St. Margrethen – ) Lustenau – Dornbirn – Feldkirch**	Vorarlberg S-Bahn	ÖBB
RE1	**Herisau – St. Gallen – Romanshorn – Kreuzlingen Hafen – Konstanz**	—	Thurbo
RE 7	**Lindau-Reutin – Hergatz – Immenstadt – Kempten Hbf** – Buchloe – Augsburg Hbf ( – Nürnberg Hbf)	—	DB Regio Bayern
RB 31	**Friedrichshafen Stadt – Überlingen – Radolfzell**	—	DB Regio Baden-Württemberg
RB 53	**Aulendorf – Bad Waldsee – Kißlegg – Leutkirch/Wangen**	—	DB Regio Baden-Württemberg
RE 70	**Lindau-Reutin – Hergatz – Immenstadt – Kempten** – Buchloe – München Hbf	—	DB Regio Bayern
RB 91	**Friedrichshafen Hafen – Friedrichshafen Stadt – Aulendorf**	—	BOB
RB 92	**Memmingen – Kißlegg – Wangen – Hergatz – Lindau-Insel**	—	Arverio
RB 93	**Friedrichshafen Stadt – Lindau-Insel**	—	DB Regio Baden-Württemberg
RE 96	**Lindau-Reutin – Lindau-Insel – Kißlegg – Memmingen** – Buchloe – München Hbf	—	Arverio

== See also ==
- Rail transport in Austria
- Rail transport in Germany
- Rail transport in Switzerland
