= Sevelen railway station =

Railway station in Switzerland

Sevelen
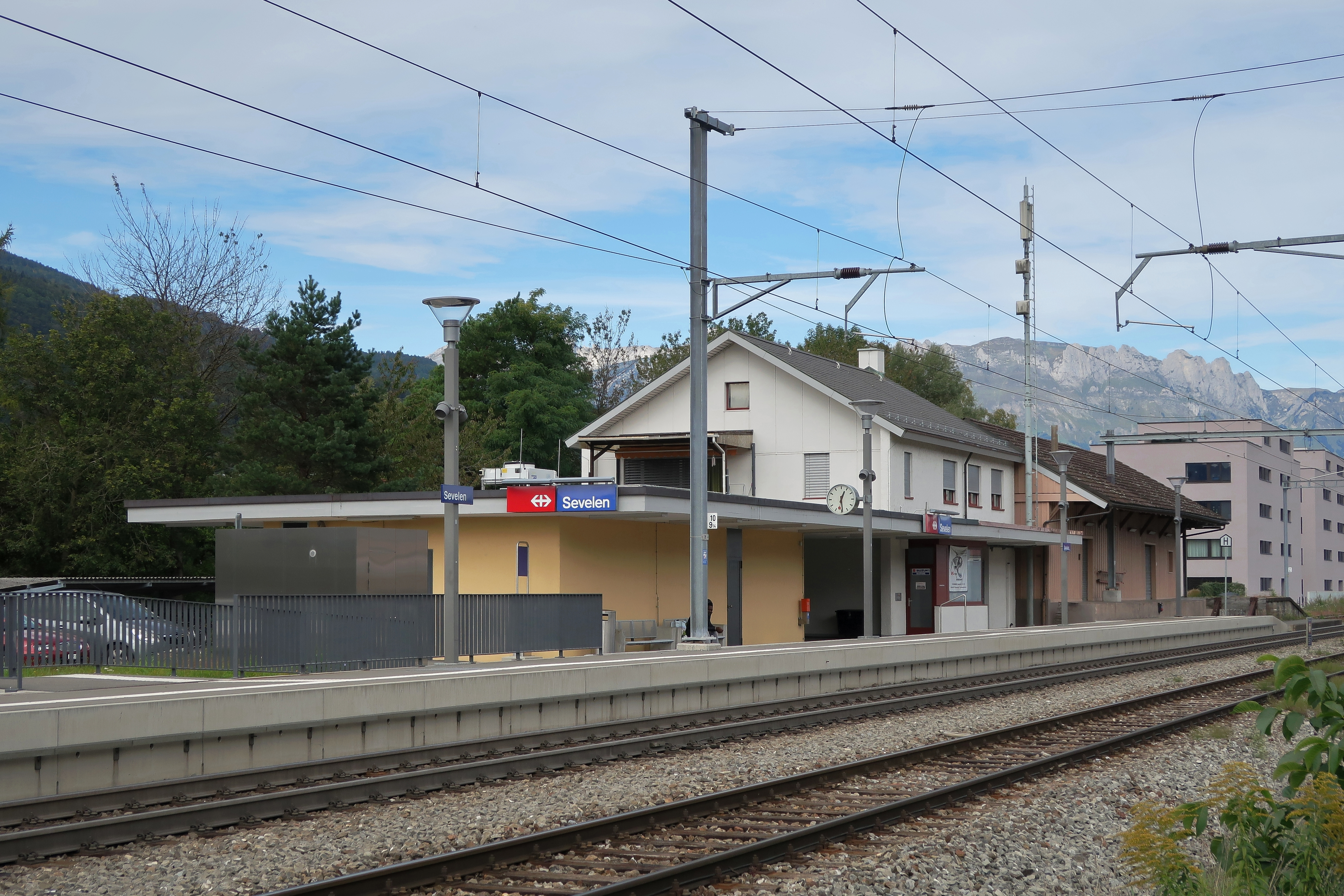
- The station building in 2019

General information
- Location: Sevelen; Switzerland
- Coordinates: 47°08′N 9°29′E
- Owner: Swiss Federal Railways
- Line: Chur–Rorschach line
- Train operators: Südostbahn

Services
Preceding station	St. Gallen S-Bahn	Following station
Buchs SG towards Rapperswil	S4	Sargans Terminus
Location
- Location within Switzerland Location within Canton of St. Gallen

Sevelen railway station (German: Bahnhof Sevelen) is a railway station in Sevelen, in the Swiss canton of St. Gallen. It is an intermediate stop on the Chur–Rorschach line.

== Services ==
As of the December 2023 timetable change, the following services stop at Sevelen:

- St. Gallen S-Bahn S4: hourly service between Rapperswil and Sargans via St. Gallen.
