= Krummenau railway station =

Train station in Switzerland

Krummenau
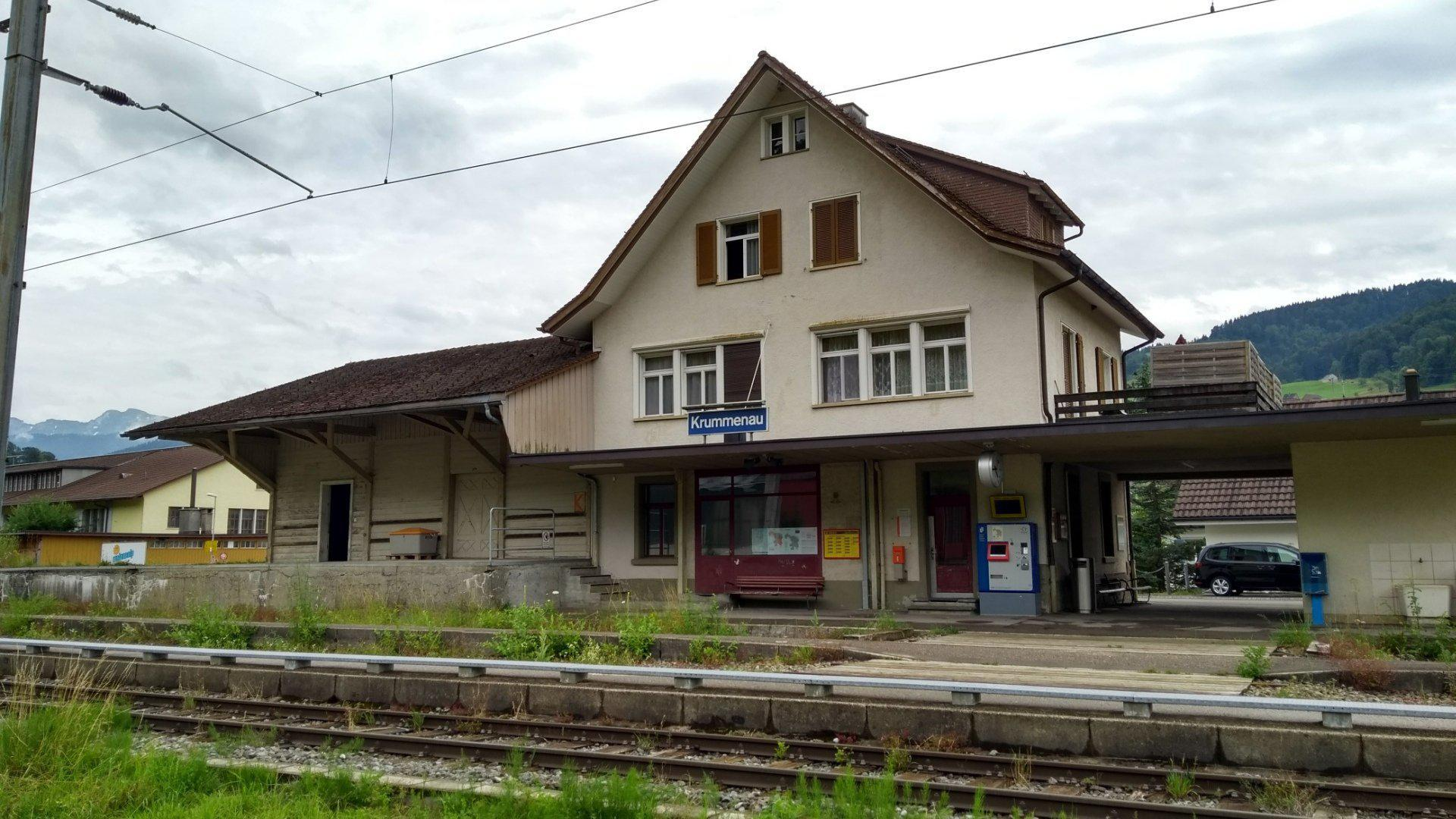
- The Krummenau station building in 2018

General information
- Location: Nesslau; Switzerland
- Coordinates: 47°14′55.7″N 9°10′05.2″E
- Elevation: 713 m (2,339 ft)
- Owner: Südostbahn
- Line: Bodensee–Toggenburg
- Platforms: 1 side platform
- Tracks: 1
- Train operators: Thurbo

Other information
- Fare zone: 365 / 366 (Tarifverbund Ostwind)

Services
Preceding station	St. Gallen S-Bahn	Following station
Nesslau-Neu St. Johann Terminus	S2	Ebnat-Kappel towards Altstätten SG
Location
- Location within Switzerland Location within Canton of St. Gallen

Krummenau railway station (German: Bahnhof Krummenau) is a railway station in Nesslau, in the Swiss canton of St. Gallen. It is an intermediate station on the Bodensee–Toggenburg railway and is served by local trains only.

== Services ==
Krummenau is served by the S2 of the St. Gallen S-Bahn:

- S2: hourly service over the Bodensee–Toggenburg railway between Nesslau-Neu St. Johann and Altstätten SG, via St. Gallen.

== See also ==
- Rail transport in Switzerland
