= S2 (St. Gallen S-Bahn) =

Railway service in Switzerland

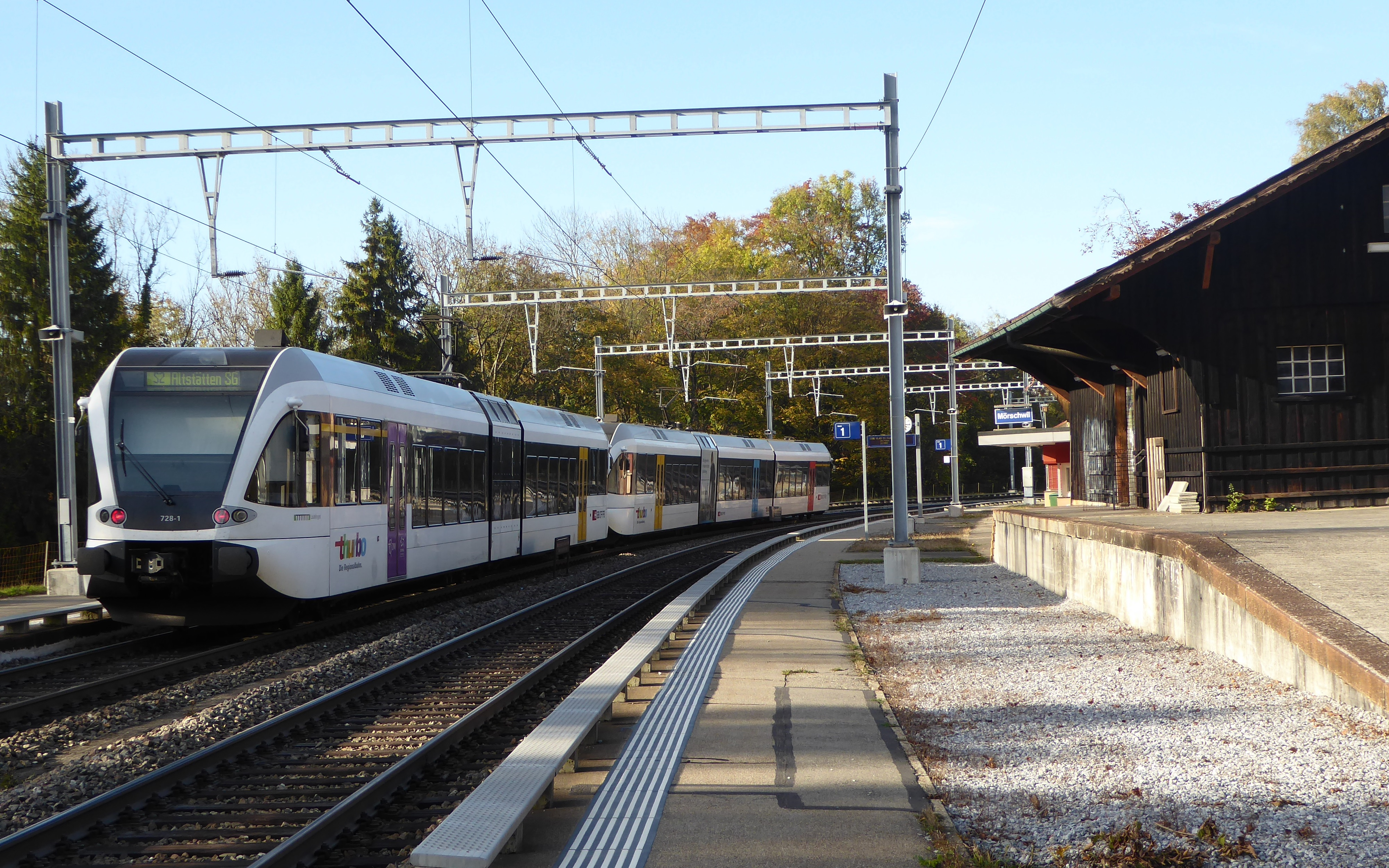
- An Altstätten SG-bound S2 at Mörschwil in 2017

Overview
- Current operator(s): THURBO

Route
- Termini: Nesslau-Neu St. Johann; Altstätten SG
- Stops: 25
- Distance travelled: 83.9 kilometres (52.1 mi)
- Average journey time: 1 hour 41 minutes
- Service frequency: Hourly
- Line(s) used: Bodensee–Toggenburg line; Rorschach–St. Gallen line; Chur–Rorschach line

The S2 is a railway service of the St. Gallen S-Bahn that provides hourly service between Nesslau-Neu St. Johann (abbreviated to Nesslau on destination signs) and Altstätten SG in the Swiss canton of St. Gallen, via Herisau in the canton of Appenzell Ausserrhoden. The section near Lake Constance (Bodensee) is also part of the Bodensee S-Bahn. THURBO, a joint venture of Swiss Federal Railways and the canton of Thurgau, operates the service.

== Operations ==
The S2 operates every hour between Nesslau-Neu St. Johann (Toggenburg) and Altstätten SG (St. Galler Rheintal), using the Bodensee–Toggenburg line between Nesslau-Neu St. Johann and St. Gallen, the Rorschach–St. Gallen line to Rorschach, and the Chur–Rorschach line to Altstätten SG. Save for the branch from Wattwil to Nesslau-Neu St. Johann, the S2 is paired with the S4 to provide half-hourly service.

== Route ==
The service links the Alpine Rhine Valley and the Toggenburg Valley with the city of St. Gallen as well as with Herisau, the capital of the canton of Appenzell Ausserrhoden.

S2 Nesslau-Neu St. Johann – Wattwil – Herisau – St. Gallen – Rorschach – Altstätten SG

- Nesslau-Neu St. Johann
- Krummenau
- Ebnat-Kappel
- Wattwil
- Lichtensteig
- Brunnadern-Neckertal (stops only on request)
- Mogelsberg (stops only on request)
- Degersheim
- Schachen (Herisau) (stops only on request)
- Herisau
- St. Gallen Haggen
- St. Gallen
- St. Gallen St. Fiden
- Mörschwil
- Goldach
- Rorschach Stadt
- Rorschach
- Staad
- Rheineck
- St. Margrethen
- Au SG
- Heerbrugg
- Rebstein-Marbach
- Altstätten SG

== History ==
Until the December 2018 timetable change, the S2's westbound terminus was St. Gallen. Service from St. Gallen to Nesslau-Neu St. Johann had been provided by the S8. Scheduling issues with the S8 prompted a swap, with the S2 taking over the S8's former schedule west of St. Gallen.
