= S4 (St. Gallen S-Bahn) =

Railway service in Switzerland

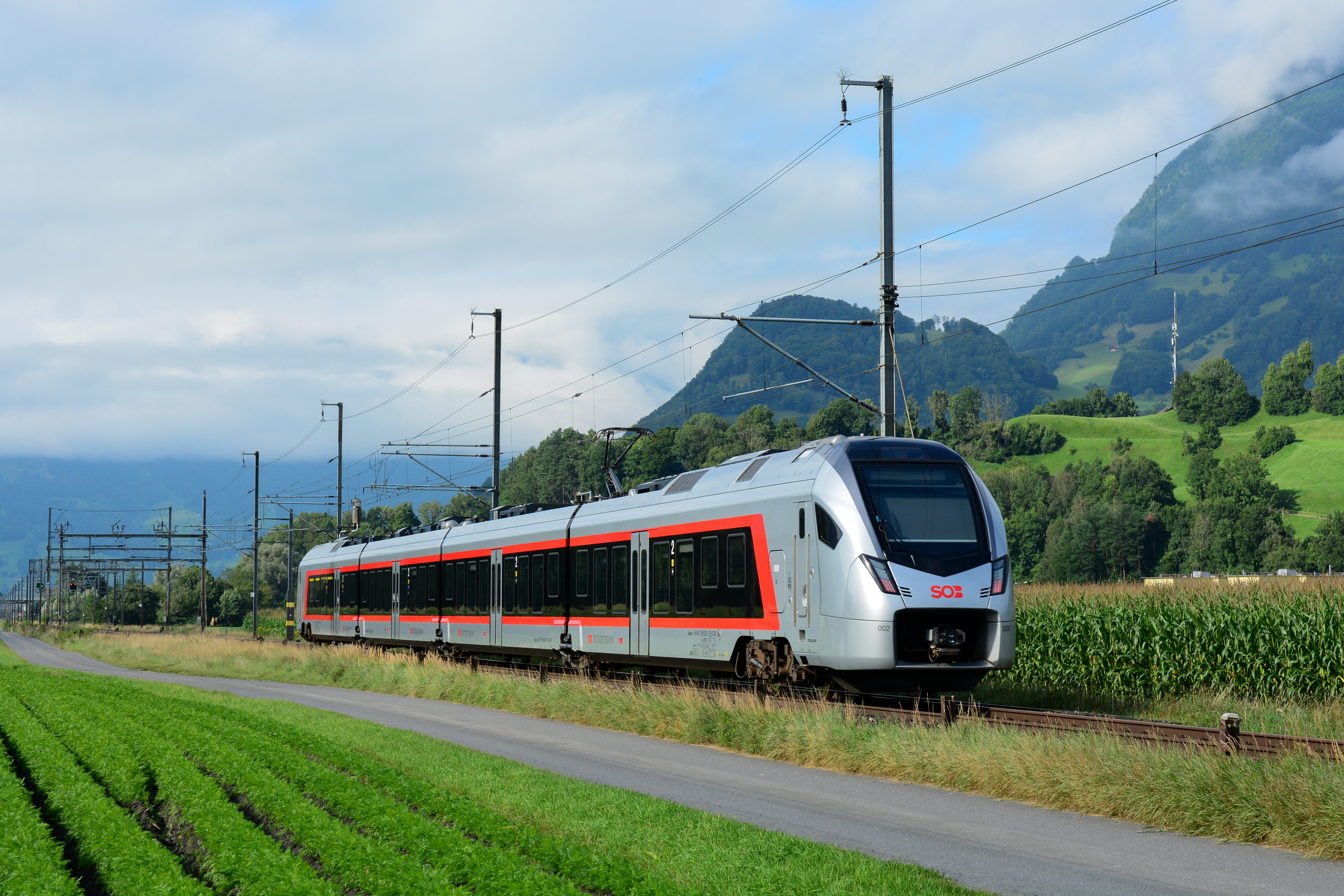
- S4 trainset near Sevelen

Overview
- First service: 15 December 2013
- Current operator: Südostbahn

Route
- Termini: Sargans; Rapperswil
- Stops: 28
- Distance travelled: 141.9 kilometres (88.2 mi)
- Average journey time: 2 hours 23 minutes
- Service frequency: Hourly
- Lines used: Chur–Rorschach railway line; Rorschach–St. Gallen railway line; Bodensee–Toggenburg railway line; Uznach–Wattwil railway line; Rapperswil–Ziegelbrücke railway line

The S4 is a railway service of the St. Gallen S-Bahn that provides hourly service between Sargans and Rapperswil via St. Gallen, connecting stations in the cantons of St. Gallen and Appenzell Ausserrhoden. The section near Lake Constance (Bodensee) is also part of the Bodensee S-Bahn. Südostbahn (SOB), a private company primarily owned by the federal government and the canton of St. Gallen, operates the service.

Between 2013–2023 it operated over a circular route (German: Ringzug), also running over the Ziegelbrücke–Sargans railway line south of the Walensee.

== Operations ==
The S4 operates hourly between Sargans and Rapperswil via St. Gallen. The service is operated by Stadler Rail Flirt/Flirt-3 EMUs of Südostbahn (SOB).

The S4 operates with the S6, S17 and IR Voralpen-Express between Rapperswil and Uznach, combining for four trains per hour and direction. The S4 does not call at intermediate stations Blumenau and Schmerikon. The S4 and the S2 combine for half-hourly service between Wattwil and Altstätten SG. Service between St. Gallen and St. Margrethen is more frequent due to the additional S5, which runs hourly. Between Wattwil and Uznach, the S4 combines with the IR Voralpen-Express for a half-hourly service, although only the S4 stops at Kaltbrunn.

== Route ==
The service links the Alpine Rhine Valley and the city of St. Gallen with the Obersee region, via Herisau, the capital of the canton of Appenzell Ausserrhoden, and the Toggenburg Valley.

S4 Rapperswil – Uznach – Wattwil – Herisau – St. Gallen – Rorschach – St. Margrethen – Altstätten SG – Buchs SG – Sargans

- Rapperswil
- Uznach
- Kaltbrunn
- Wattwil
- Lichtensteig
- Brunnadern-Neckertal (stops only on request)
- Mogelsberg (stops only on request)
- Degersheim
- Schachen (Herisau) (stops only on request)
- Herisau
- St. Gallen Haggen
- St. Gallen
- St. Gallen St. Fiden
- Mörschwil
- Goldach
- Rorschach Stadt
- Rorschach
- Staad
- Rheineck
- St. Margrethen
- Au SG
- Heerbrugg
- Rebstein-Marbach
- Altstätten SG
- Oberriet
- Rüthi SG
- Salez-Sennwald
- Buchs SG
- Sevelen
- Sargans

== History ==
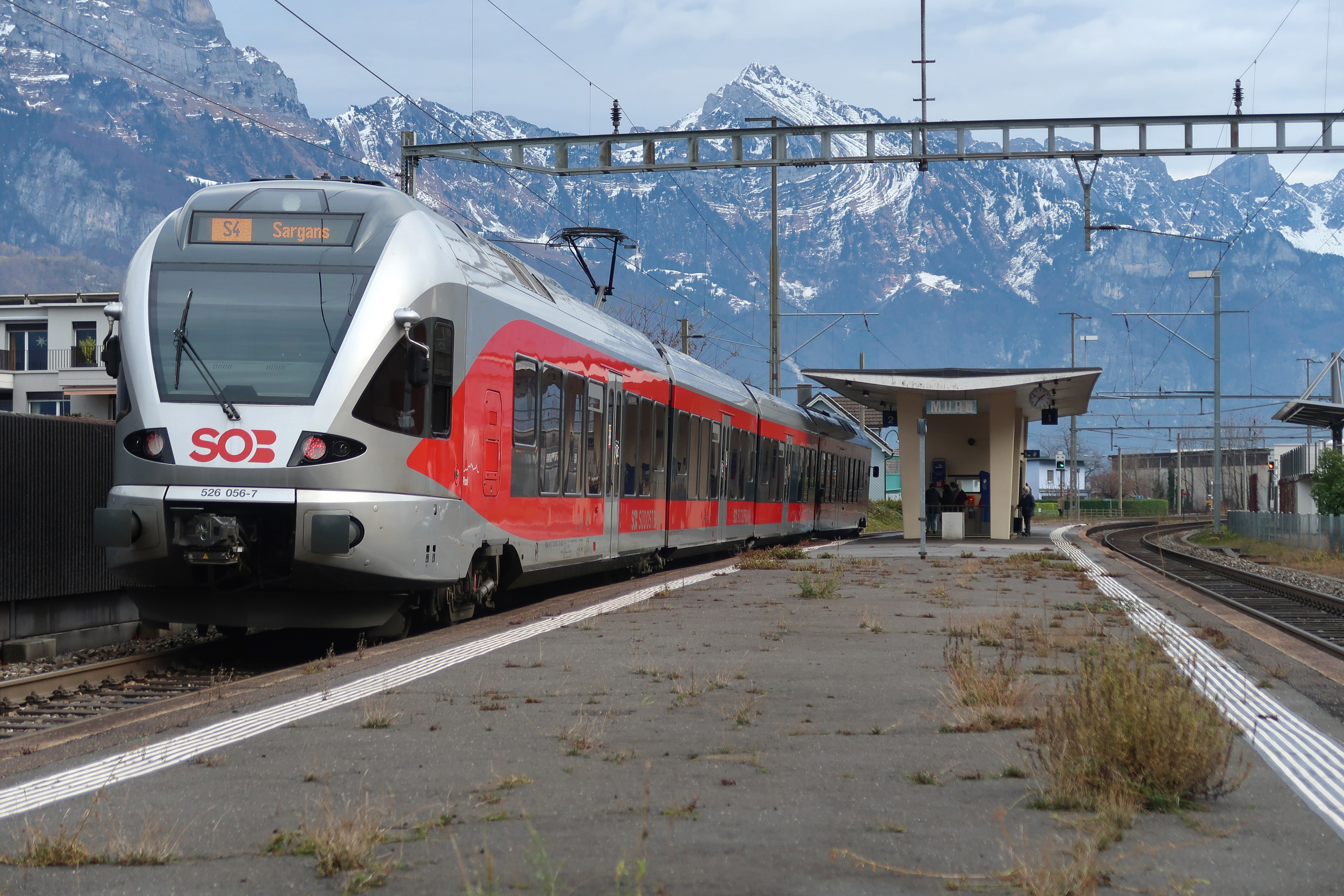
A counter-clockwise S4 at Murg in 2020

Prior to the December 2013 timetable change, the S4 operated between St. Gallen and Uznach. Local service between Uznach and Sargans was handled by an hourly regional service that ran between Ziegelbrücke and Chur. Service southeast of St. Gallen toward Sargans was handled by various local services, but only the Rheintal-Express operated over the whole route.

Südostbahn introduced the new S4 on 15 December 2013 as a circle line (German: Ringzug), which was sometimes referred to as the 'Alpstein round trip' (Alpsteinrundfahrt). Until 9 December 2023, the service operated hourly in both a clockwise and counter-clockwise direction. A full journey around the circle took approximately three hours. In Uznach, which lies to the west of the junction between the Uznach–Wattwil and Rapperswil–Ziegelbrücke lines, the trains reversed their direction of travel before continuing on the circle route.

With the 10 December 2023 timetable change, the circular operation ended. The S4's new termini became Rapperswil and Sargans, respectively, and the new S17 began running between Rapperswil and Sargans via Ziegelbrücke. However, the trainsets operating as S4 and S17 services continue as the respective other line from Sargans, so that passengers can still take the circular route around Alpstein without changing trains in Sargans; a change of trains is nonetheless required in either Uznach or Rapperswil. Rerouting of the S4 and introduction of the new S17 service were made possible through the expansion to dual track between Uznach and Schmerikon (constructed between 2021 and 2023) on the Rapperswil–Ziegelbrücke railway line.
