= Lichtensteig railway station =

Train station in Switzerland

Lichtensteig
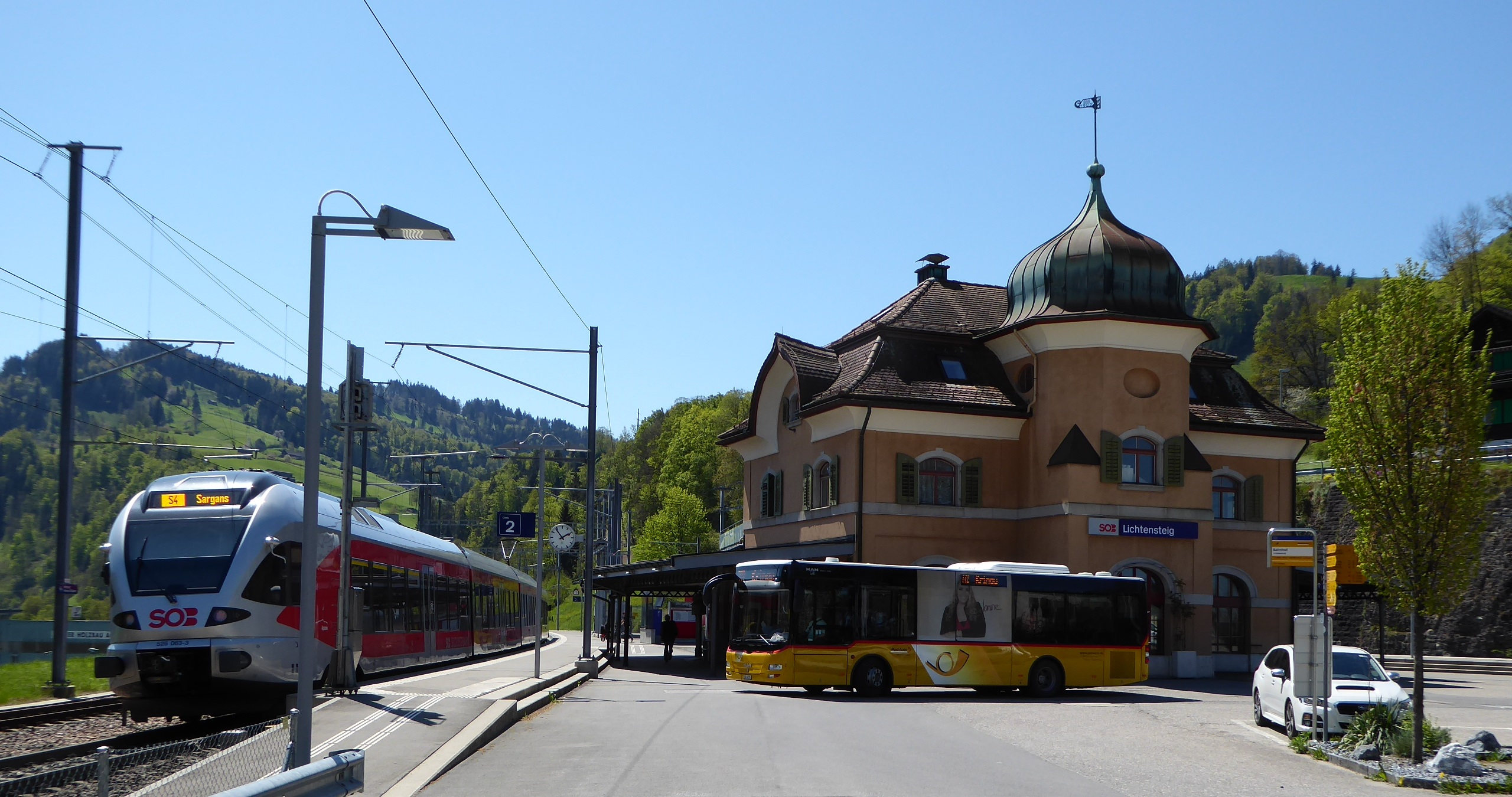
- The Lichtensteig station building in 2015, with a Südostbahn FLIRT on the Bodensee–Toggenburg railway side

General information
- Location: Lichtensteig; Switzerland
- Coordinates: 47°19′12″N 9°04′59″E
- Elevation: 616 m (2,021 ft)
- Owner: Südostbahn
- Lines: Bodensee–Toggenburg; Wil–Ebnat-Kappel
- Platforms: 2 side platforms
- Tracks: 3
- Train operators: Thurbo; Südostbahn
- Connections
- Bus: BLWE bus route 770; PostAuto bus route 772

Construction
- Architect: Salomon Schlatter (1910)

Other information
- Fare zone: 974 (Tarifverbund Ostwind)

Services
Preceding station	St. Gallen S-Bahn	Following station
Wattwil towards Nesslau-Neu St. Johann	S2	Brunnadern-Neckertal towards Altstätten SG
Wattwil towards Rapperswil	S4	Brunnadern-Neckertal towards Sargans
Wattwil Terminus	S9	Dietfurt towards Wil
Terminus	SN72 Limited service	Brunnadern-Neckertal towards Romanshorn
Location
- Location within Switzerland Location within Canton of St. Gallen

Lichtensteig railway station (German: Bahnhof Lichtensteig) is a railway station in Lichtensteig, in the Swiss canton of St. Gallen. It sits at the junction of the Bodensee–Toggenburg railway and Wil–Ebnat-Kappel railway and is served by local trains only. It is an example of a Keilbahnhof.

== Services ==
=== Train ===
As of the December 2023 timetable change, the following services stop at Lichtensteig:

- St. Gallen S-Bahn:
  - S2 / S4: half-hourly service between Wattwil and Altstätten SG via St. Gallen and hourly service to Rapperswil, Sargans, and Nesslau-Neu St. Johann.
  - S9: half-hourly service between Wattwil and Wil.

On weekends (Friday and Saturday nights), there is also a nighttime S-Bahn services (SN72) offered by the Ostwind tariff network.

- SN72: hourly service to Romanshorn, via St. Gallen.

=== Bus ===
The station is also served by bus routes of PostAuto Schweiz and Busbetrieb Lichtensteig–Wattwil–Ebnat-Kappel (BLWE), which depart from the station forecourt.

== See also ==
- Rail transport in Switzerland
