= Wattwil railway station =

Railway station in Switzerland

Wattwil
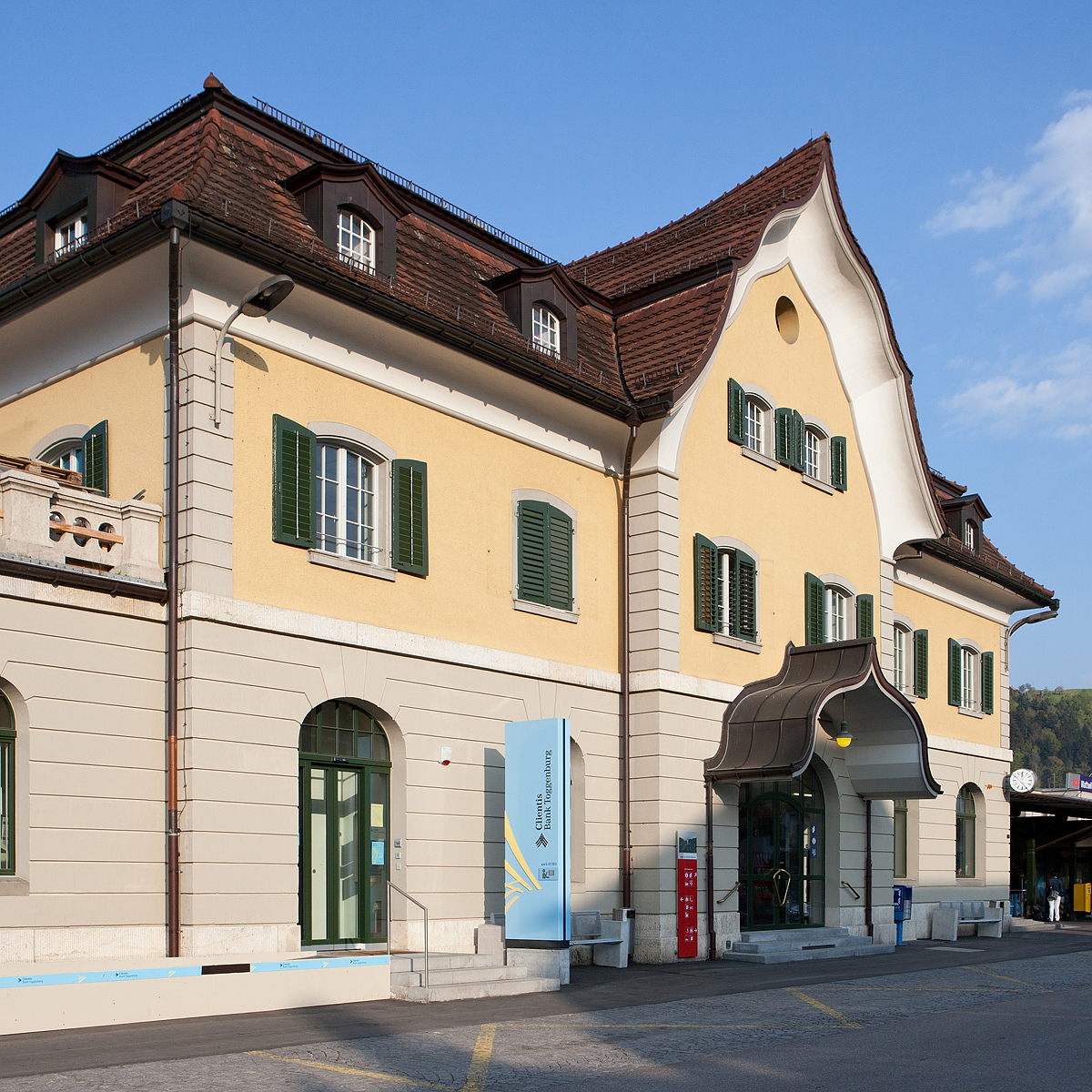
- The Wattwil station building in 2011

General information
- Location: Wattwil; Switzerland
- Coordinates: 47°17′58″N 9°05′12″E
- Elevation: 614 m (2,014 ft)
- Owner: Südostbahn
- Lines: Bodensee–Toggenburg; Uznach–Wattwil; Wil–Ebnat-Kappel
- Platforms: 1 side platform; 2 island platforms
- Tracks: 5
- Train operators: Thurbo; Südostbahn
- Connections
- Bus: Schneider Busbetriebe bus route 622; BLWE bus route 770; PostAuto bus routes 780 790

Construction
- Architect: Heinrich Ditscher (1910), Johann Jakob Breitinger (1870)

Other information
- Fare zone: 974 (Tarifverbund Ostwind)

Passengers
- 2018: 8200 per weekday

Services
Preceding station	Südostbahn	Following station
Uznach towards Lucerne	Voralpen Express	Herisau towards St. Gallen
Preceding station	St. Gallen S-Bahn	Following station
Ebnat-Kappel towards Nesslau-Neu St. Johann	S2	Lichtensteig towards Altstätten SG
Kaltbrunn towards Rapperswil	S4	Lichtensteig towards Sargans
Terminus	S9	Lichtensteig towards Wil
Location
- Location within Switzerland Location within Canton of St. Gallen

Wattwil railway station (German: Bahnhof Wattwil) is a railway station in Wattwil, in the Swiss canton of St. Gallen. It is an intermediate station on the Bodensee–Toggenburg railway, the southern terminus of the Wil–Ebnat-Kappel railway, and the eastern terminus of the Uznach–Wattwil railway (the latter includes the 8.6 kilometres (5.3 mi) long Ricken Tunnel). It is served by local and long-distance trains.

== Services ==
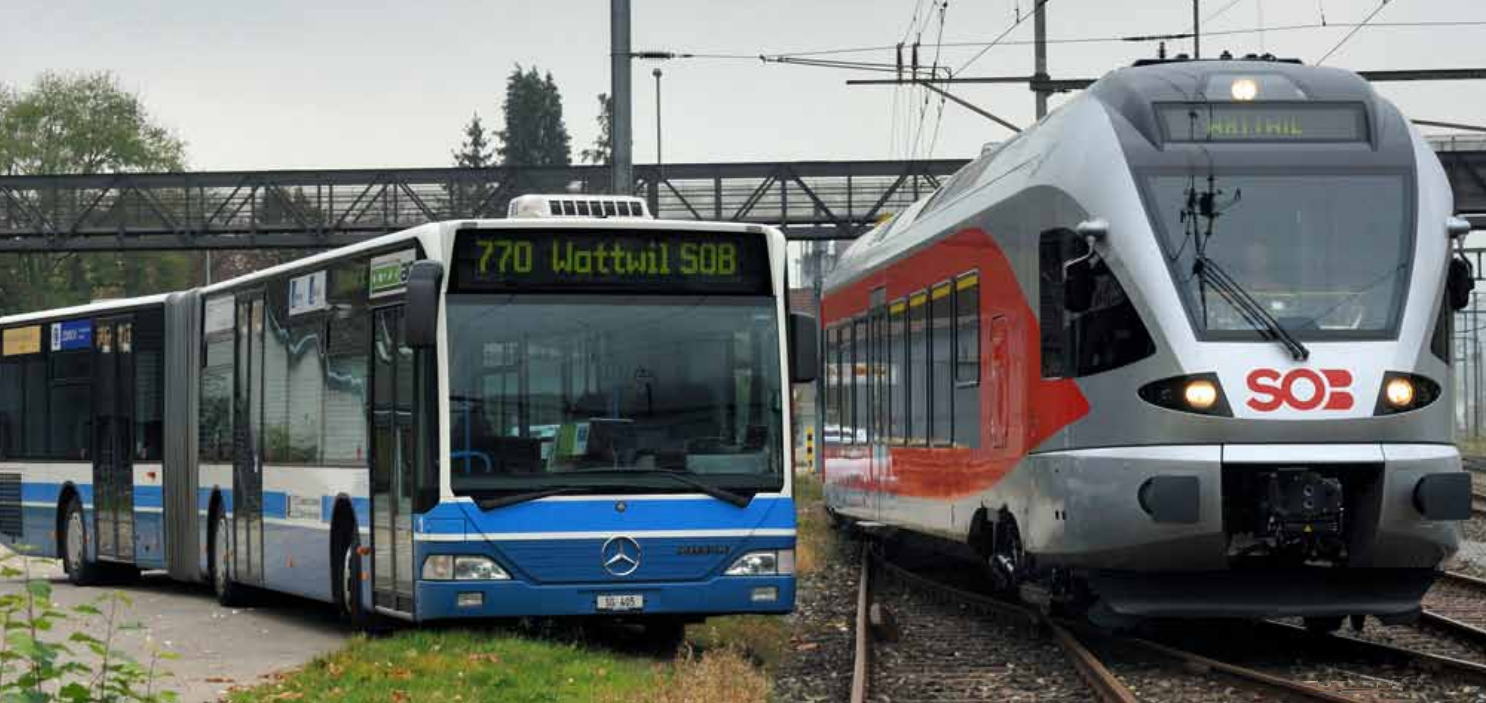
BLWE bus and Südostbahn EMU

=== Trains ===
As of the December 2023 timetable change, the following services stop at Wattwil:

- IR Voralpen-Express: hourly service between Lucerne and St. Gallen (via Arth-Goldau and Rapperswil).
- St. Gallen S-Bahn:
  - S2 / S4: half-hourly service to Altstätten SG via St. Gallen and hourly service to Rapperswil, Sargans, and Nesslau-Neu St. Johann.
  - S9: half-hourly service between Wattwil and Wil SG.

=== Bus ===
Several bus services depart from the station forecourt. Services are provided by Busbetrieb Lichtensteig–Wattwil–Ebnat-Kappel (BLWE), Schneider Busbetriebe and PostAuto Schweiz. The bus lines are as follows:

Line	Route	Operator
622	(Wattwil railway station – Ricken – Gebertingen –) St. Gallenkappel – Eschenbach – Wagen – Kreuz (Jona railway station) – Rapperswil railway station	Schneider Busbetriebe
770	Lichtensteig, Steigrüti – Wattwil railway station – Ulisbach – Ebnat-Kappel railway station – Ebnat-Kappel, Wier	BLWE
780	Wattwil railway station – Heiterswil – Hemberg	PostAuto Schweiz
790	Wattwil railway station – Ebnat-Kappel railway station – Ebnat-Kappel, Gieselbach – Krummenau – Nesslau-Neu St. Johann railway station – Nesslau – Stein SG – Starkenbach SG – Alt St. Johann – Unterwasser – Wildhaus (– Gams – Grabs SG – Buchs SG railway station)	PostAuto Schweiz

== Gallery ==
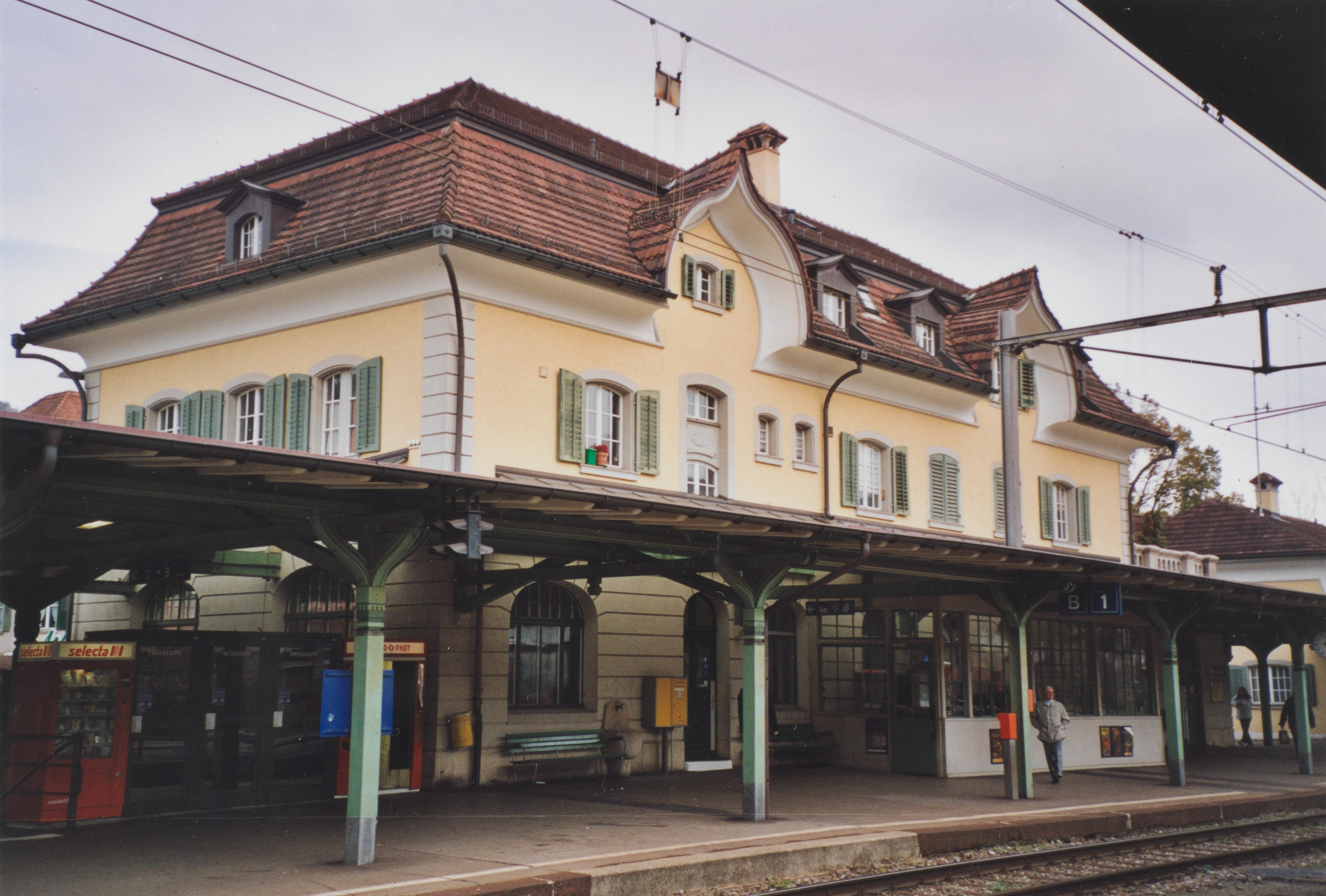
station building (2003)

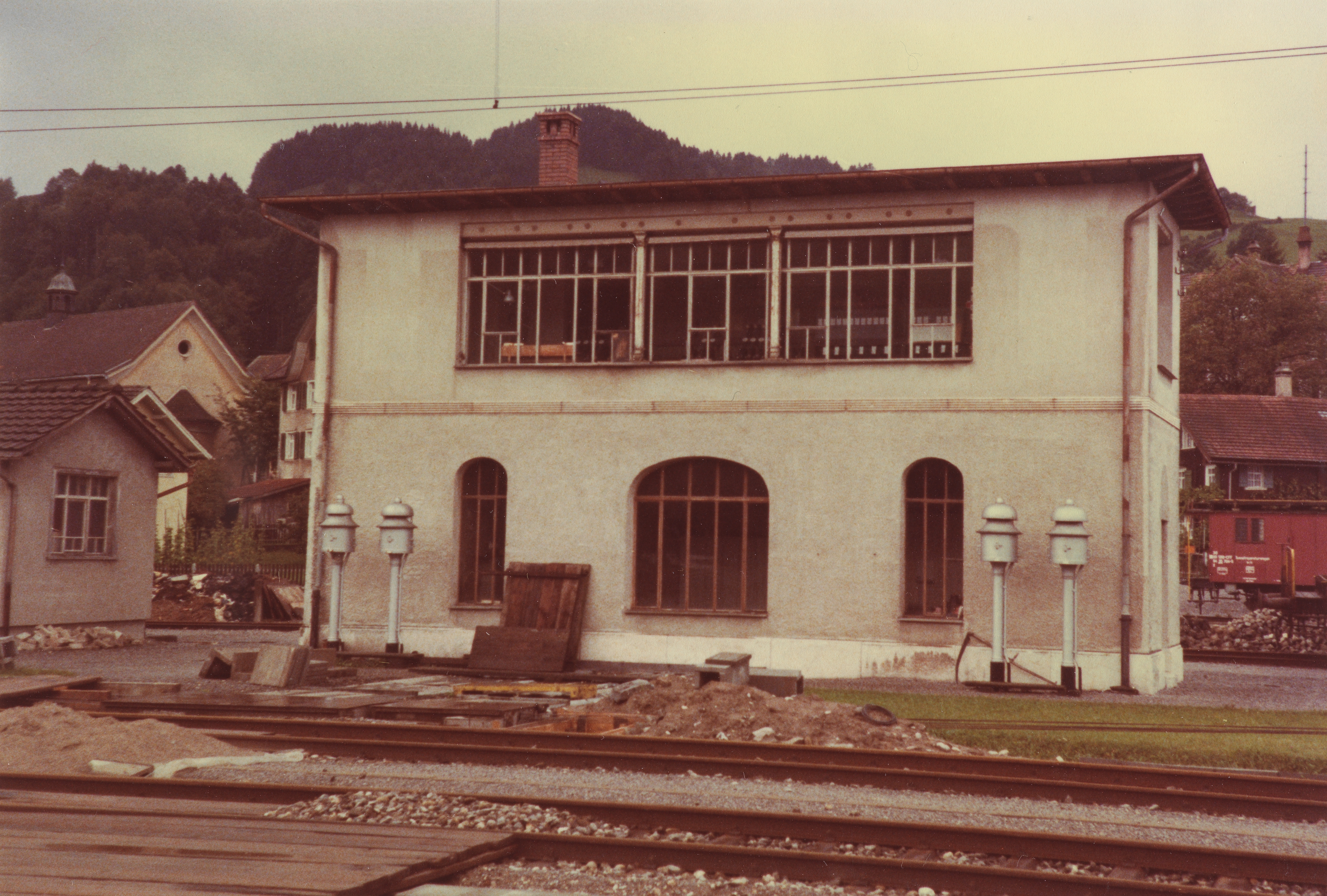
signal box (ca. 1990)

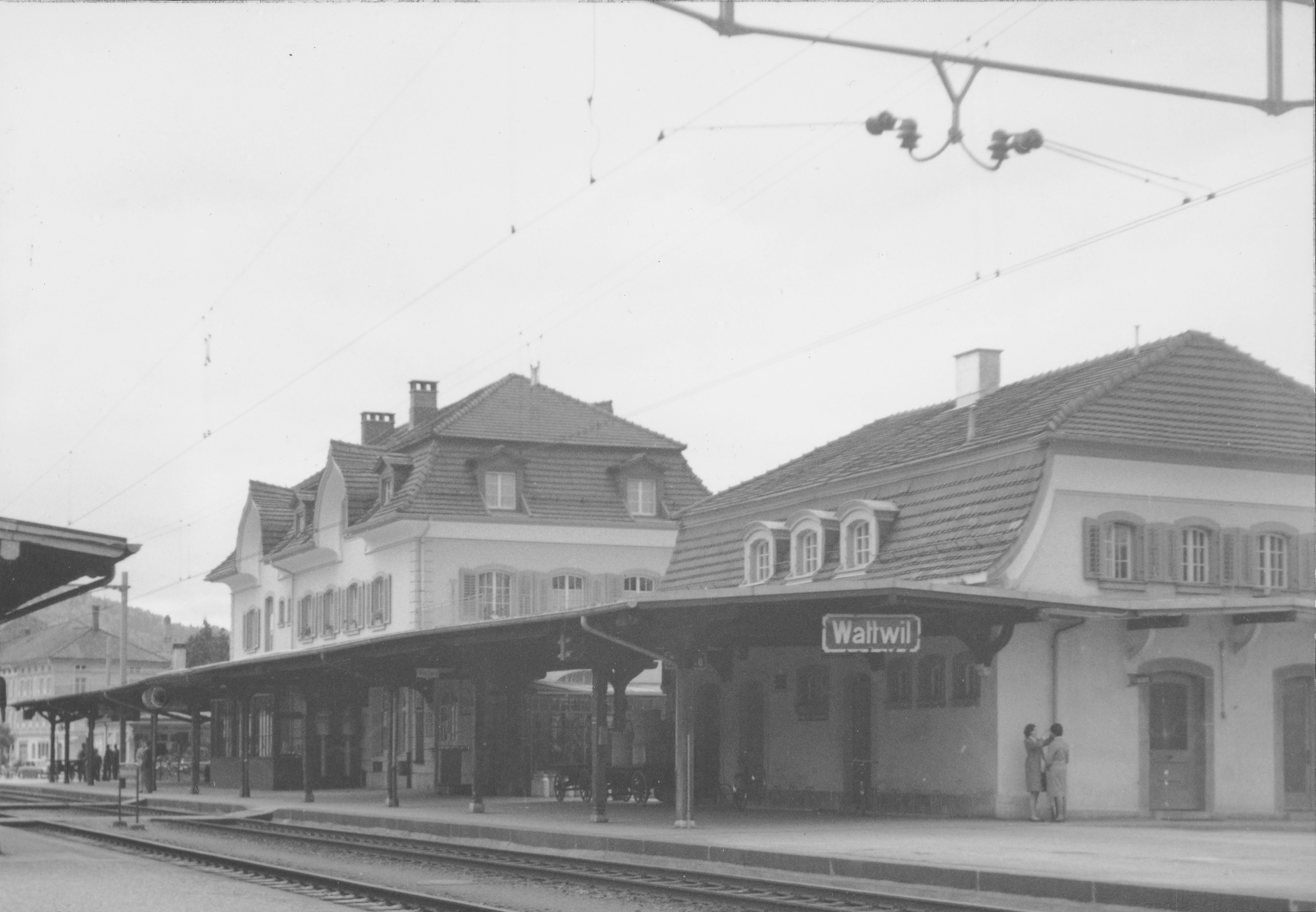
station building (1961)

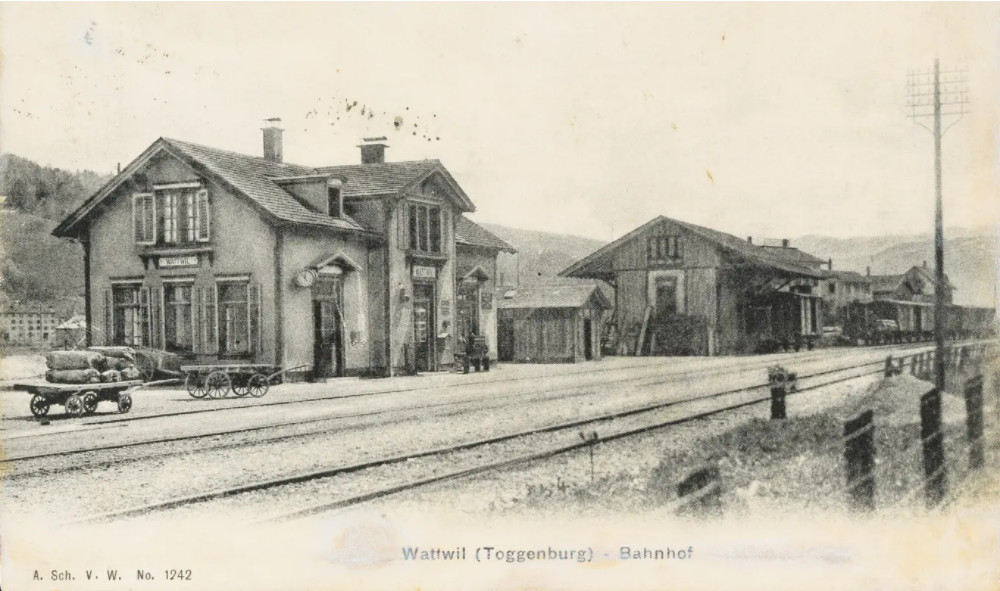
Wattwil station (early 20th century)

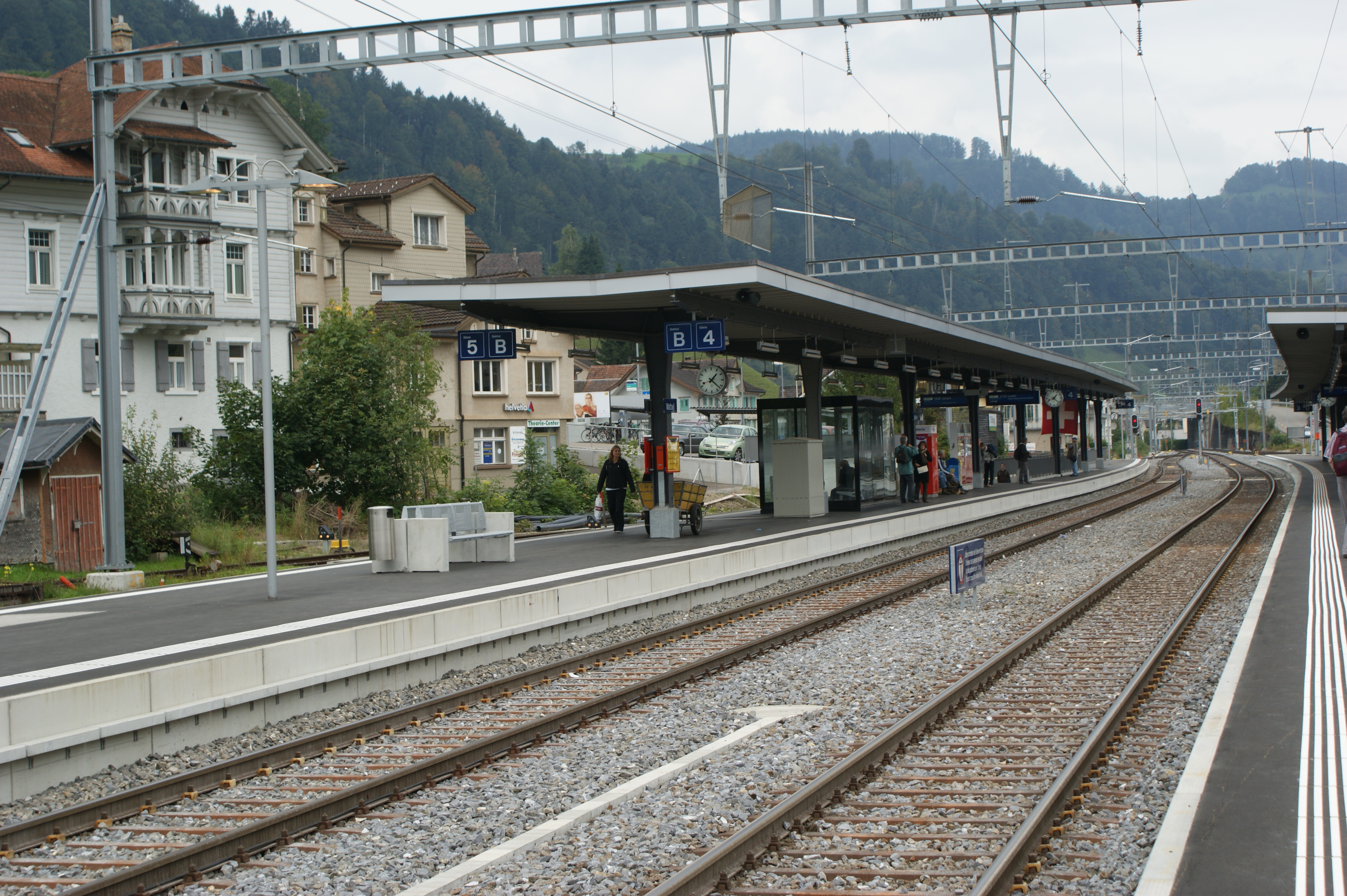
Tracks and platforms

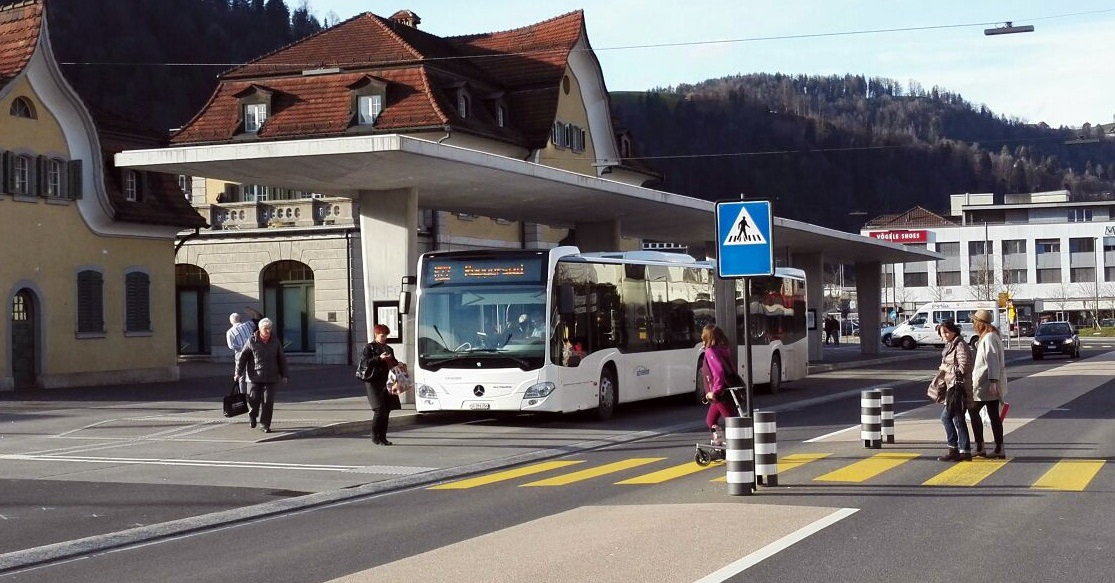
Wattwil bus station next to railway station

== See also ==
- Rail transport in Switzerland
