= St. Gallen railway station =

Railway station in St. Gallen, Switzerland

St. Gallen
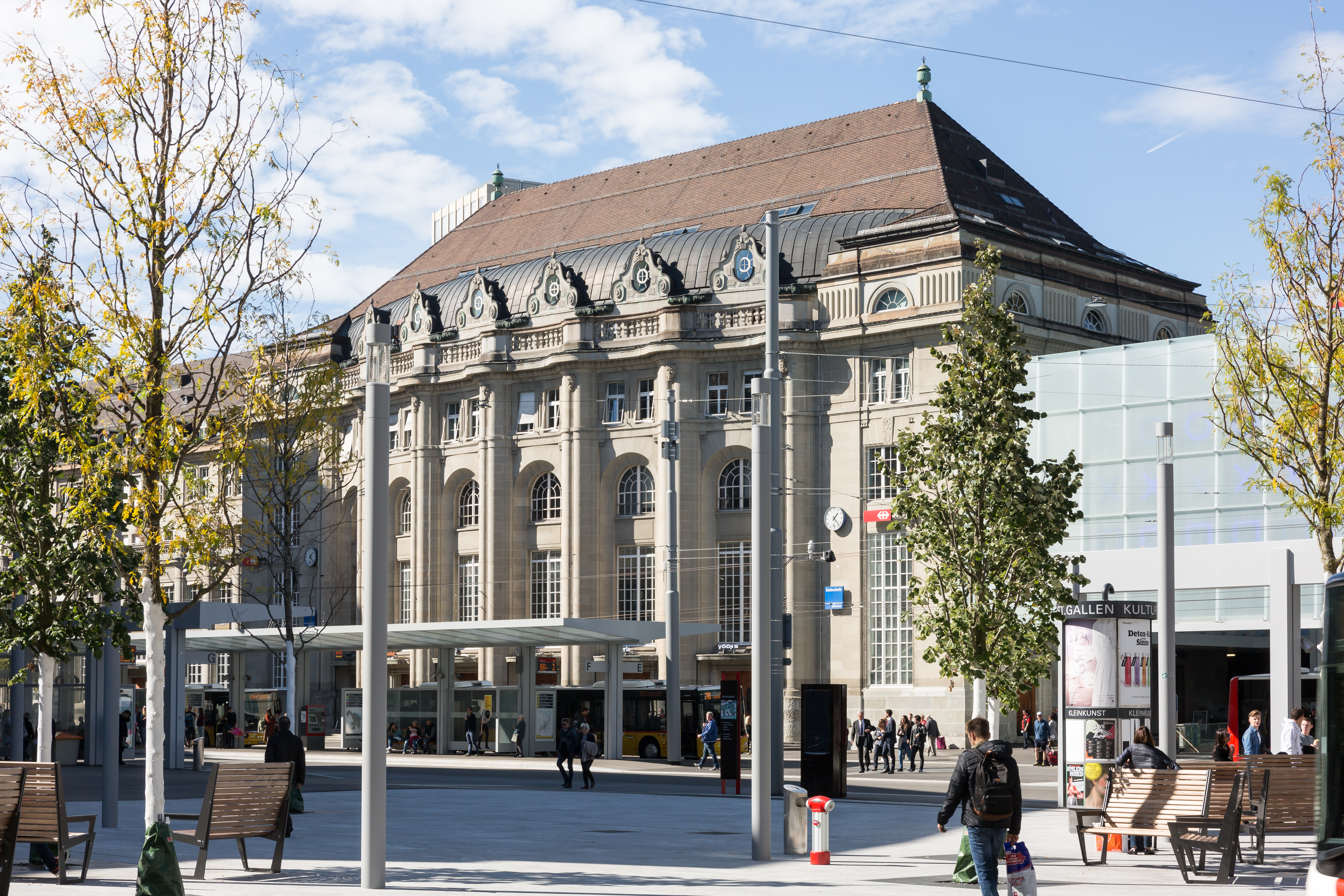
- The station building in October 2018

General information
- Location: Bahnhofplatz; St. Gallen; Switzerland
- Coordinates: 47°25′23″N 9°22′12″E
- Elevation: 669 m (2,195 ft)
- Owner: Swiss Federal Railways
- Lines: St. Gallen–Winterthur line; Rorschach–St. Gallen line; Appenzell–St. Gallen–Trogen line; Romanshorn–Toggenburg line
- Distance: 21.5 km (13.4 mi) from Romanshorn; 80.5 km (50.0 mi) from Sargans
- Platforms: 3 island platforms; 3 side platform
- Tracks: 9
- Train operators: Appenzell Railways; Südostbahn; Swiss Federal Railways; Thurbo
- Connections: Ostwind tariff network
- Trolleybus: VBSG trolleybus routes 1 3 4 5
- Bus: VBSG bus routes 2 6 7 8 9 10 11 12 PostAuto bus routes 120 121 180 200 201 210 211 242 Regiobus route 151

Other information
- Fare zone: 210 (Tarifverbund Ostwind)
- Website: Bahnhof St. Gallen

History
- Opened: 1856
- Rebuilt: 2018

Passengers
- 2025: 46,900 per day (SBB, SOB, Thurbo)
- Rank: 15 out of 1,095
Services
Preceding station	SBB CFF FFS	Following station
Winterthur towards Zürich HB	EuroCity	St. Margrethen towards München Hbf
Gossau SG towards Geneva Airport	IC 1	Terminus
Winterthur towards Lausanne	IC 5	Rorschach Terminus
Winterthur towards Lausanne	IC 5	Terminus
Gossau SG towards Zürich HB	IR 13	Rorschach towards Sargans
Preceding station	Südostbahn	Following station
Herisau towards Lucerne	Voralpen Express	Terminus
Terminus	IR 13 Alpenrhein-Express	Rorschach towards Chur
Preceding station	St. Gallen S-Bahn	Following station
St. Gallen Bruggen towards Wil	S1	St. Gallen St. Fiden towards Schaffhausen
St. Gallen Haggen towards Nesslau-Neu St. Johann	S2	St. Gallen St. Fiden towards Altstätten SG
St. Gallen Haggen towards Rapperswil	S4	St. Gallen St. Fiden towards Sargans
St. Gallen Bruggen towards Weinfelden	S5	St. Gallen St. Fiden towards St. Margrethen
Niederteufen towards Appenzell	S20	St. Gallen Marktplatz towards Trogen
St. Gallen Güterbahnhof towards Appenzell	S21	St. Gallen Marktplatz towards Trogen
St. Gallen Güterbahnhof towards Teufen AR	S22	St. Gallen Marktplatz towards Trogen
St. Gallen Haggen towards Herisau	S81	Terminus
Terminus	S82	St. Gallen St. Fiden towards Wittenbach
St. Gallen Bruggen towards Winterthur	SN21 Limited service	Terminus
St. Gallen Bruggen towards Winterthur	SN22 Limited service	St. Gallen St. Fiden towards Heerbrugg
Herisau towards Lichtensteig	SN72 Limited service	St. Gallen St. Fiden towards Romanshorn
Preceding station	Thurbo	Following station
Herisau Terminus	RE1	Romanshorn towards Konstanz
Location
- Location within Switzerland Location within Canton of St. Gallen

St. Gallen railway station (German: Bahnhof St. Gallen) is the main railway station of the city of St. Gallen, the capital of the canton of St. Gallen in Switzerland. It is located at the junction of the standard gauge St. Gallen–Winterthur and Rorschach–St. Gallen lines of Swiss Federal Railways (SBB CFF FFS), the standard gauge Romanshorn–Toggenburg line of Südostbahn (SOB), and the 1,000 mm (3 ft 3 3/8 in) gauge Appenzell–St. Gallen–Trogen line of Appenzell Railways (Appenzeller Bahnen, AB).

Opened in 1856 and completely rebuilt at the outset of the 20th century and refurbished between 2016–2018, the station is owned and operated by Swiss Federal Railways. It is served by both national and international long-distance trains, and is the focal point of the St. Gallen S-Bahn regional train network (it is also included in the Bodensee S-Bahn). The station also serves as a central station to the Appenzell Railways and has many city and urban bus connections in front of the main building.

Besides main station, there are 12 other railway stations in the city of St. Gallen (corresponding to zone 210 of the Ostwind tariff network), which are served only by local trains: Birnbäumen, Bruggen, Güterbahnhof, Haggen, Marktplatz, Notkersegg, Riethüsli, Schülerhaus, Schwarzer Bären, Spisertor, St. Fiden and Winkeln.

== Layout and facilities ==
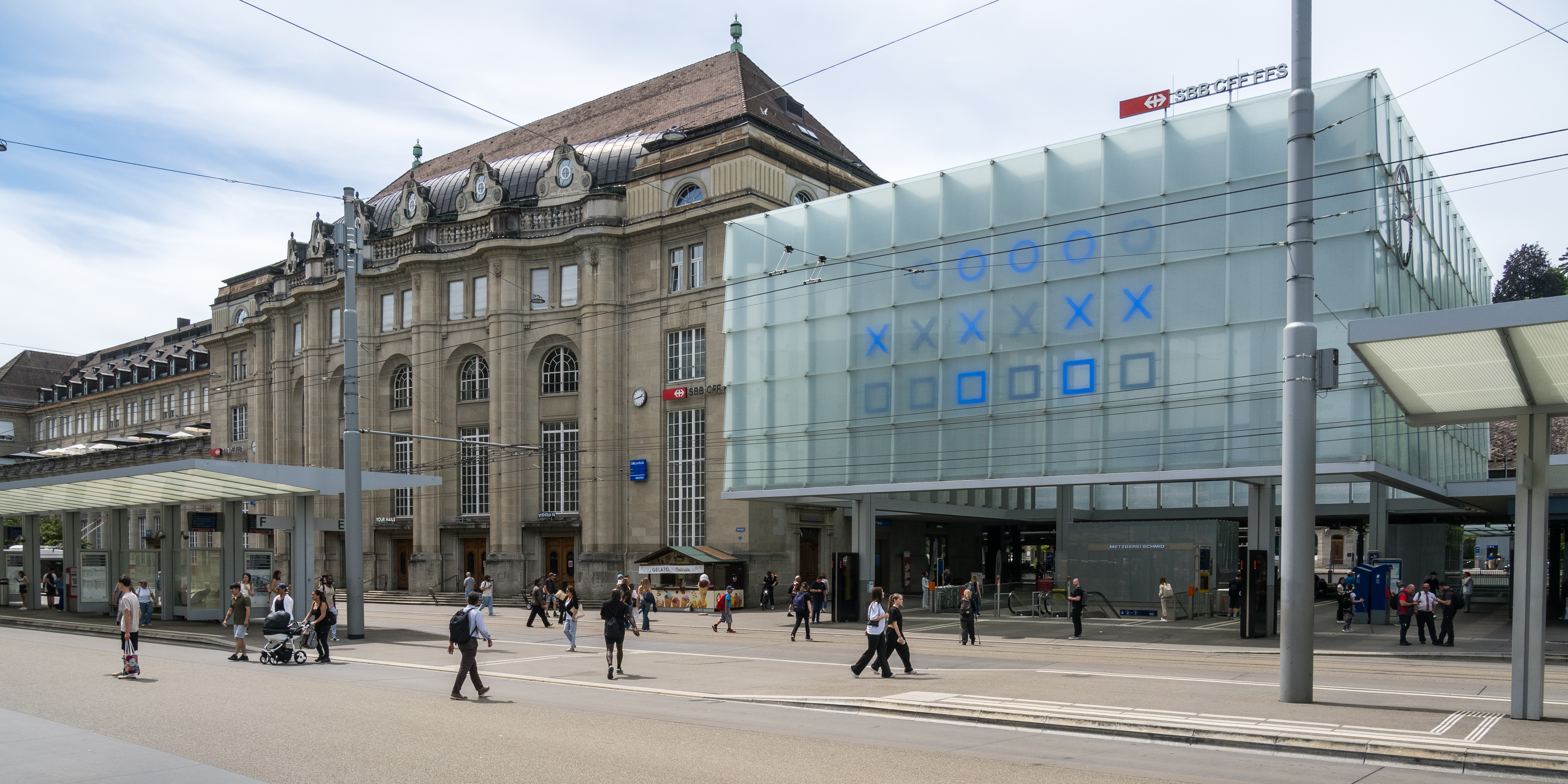
Station building with binary clock

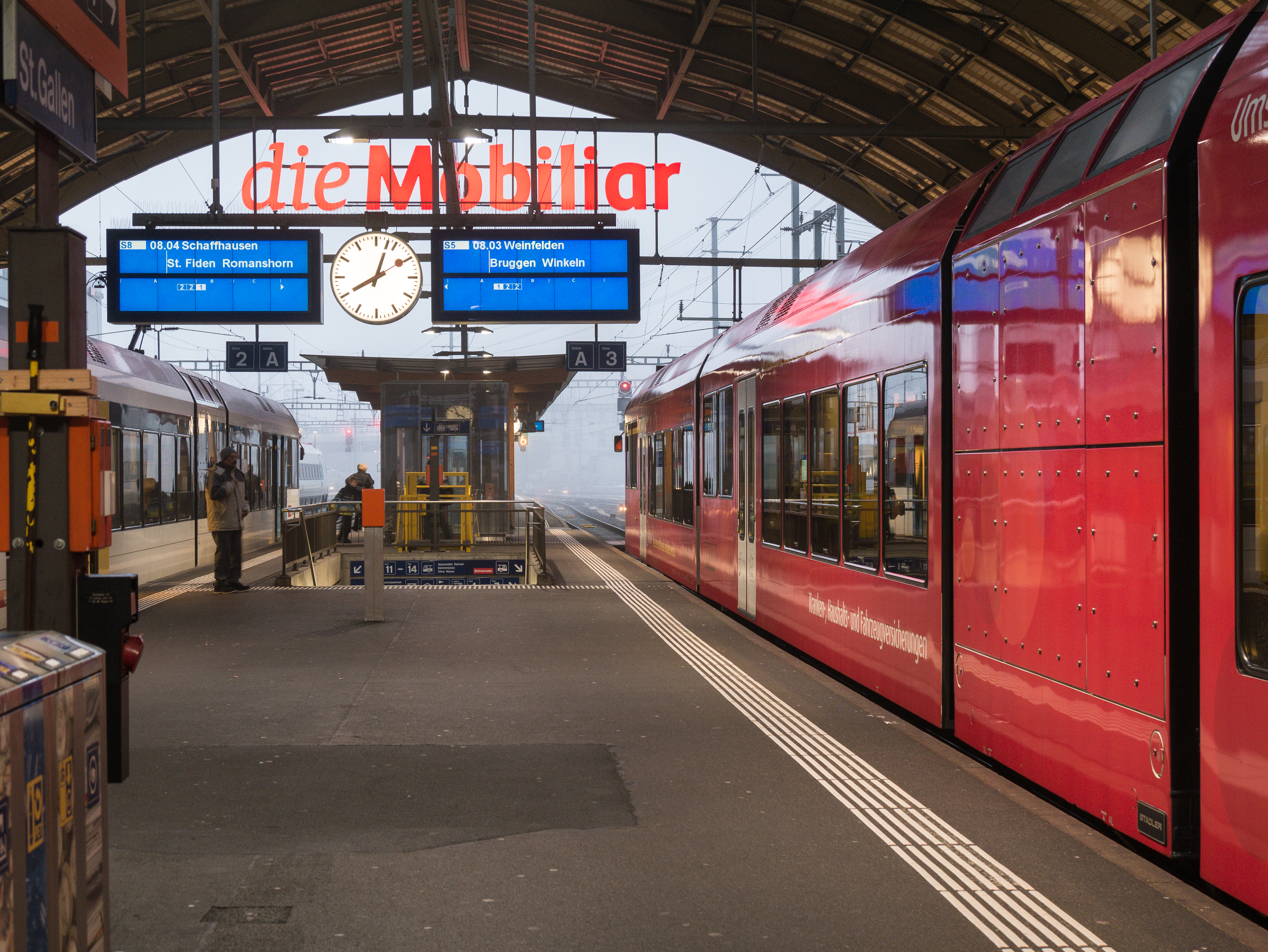
Platforms and trains

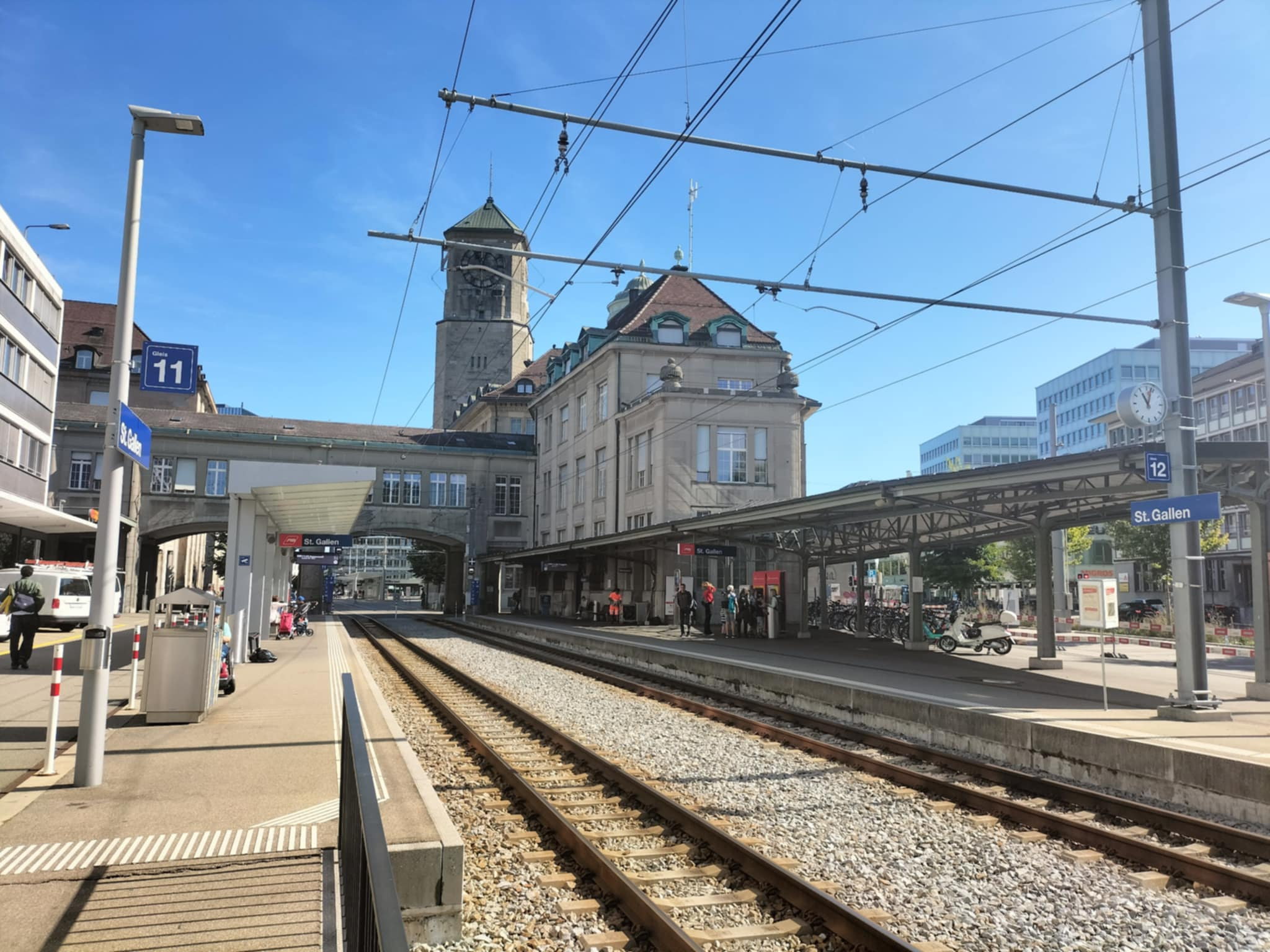
St. Gallen AB station (tracks 11 and 12)

St. Gallen railway station is situated to the west of the city centre (Altstadt), and consists of two parts. The standard gauge portion of the station (St. Gallen–Winterthur, St. Gallen–Rorschach and Bodensee–Toggenburg lines), located to the north of Bahnhofplatz (lit. 'railway station square'), consists of four platforms (one side platform and three island platforms) serving 7 tracks (Gleis, Nos. 1–7), of which one is a cul-de-sac. In addition, there are four sidings. Towards east, the railway tracks continue through the 1.466 km (0.911 mi) long Rosenberg Tunnel to St. Gallen St. Fiden. Appenzell Railways (AB) serves the meter gauge tracks 11 and 12 on the Appenzell–Trogen line with a pair of side platforms at the western end of Bahnhofplatz (St. Gallen AB station). Buses depart from the terminal at Bahnhofplatz.

The station and its forecourt were refurbished between 2016 and 2018. The standard gauge tracks are crossed by two underpasses, the eastern one of which contains shops and take-aways. Additional shops and restaurants as well as the ticket offices are located in the station building. The southern entry of the eastern underpass features a binary clock.

The Eastern Switzerland University of Applied Sciences (OST) is located immediately northwest of the station. Further to the west, there is a circular building, the former Lokremise (lit. 'engine shed' that had a tuntable at its center), which now houses a restaurant and cinema.

== Services ==
=== Rail ===
As of the December 2023 timetable change, the following rail services stop at St. Gallen:

- EuroCity (EC): service every two hours between Zürich Hauptbahnhof and München Hauptbahnhof, via Bregenz (runs as ECE 88 in Germany). (Note: Due to persistent delays of the Deutsche Bahn operated trains, SBB no longer wants to include these trains in the Swiss railway timetable.)
- InterCity:
  - /: half-hourly service to Geneva Airport via Zürich Airport, and hourly service to Rorschach
- InterRegio:
  - : hourly service to Zürich Hauptbahnhof, half-hourly service to Chur
  - Voralpen Express: hourly service to Lucerne via Rapperswil and Arth-Goldau
- RegioExpress:
  - RE1: hourly service over the Bodensee–Toggenburg line between Herisau and Konstanz via Romanshorn
- St. Gallen S-Bahn (most lines are also part of Bodensee S-Bahn):
  - S1: half-hourly service between Wil and Schaffhausen.
  - S2 / S4: half-hourly service between Wattwil and Altstätten SG and hourly service to Rapperswil, Sargans, and Nesslau-Neu St. Johann.
  - S5: half-hourly (weekdays) or hourly (weekends) service over the St. Gallen–Winterthur railway to Weinfelden and hourly service over the Rorschach–St. Gallen railway to St. Margrethen.
  - S20: rush-hour service over the Appenzell–St. Gallen–Trogen railway between Appenzell and Trogen (only calls at Niederteufen, Teufen AR and Bühler between St. Gallen and Gais).
  - S21: half-hourly service over the Appenzell–St. Gallen–Trogen railway between Appenzell and Trogen.
  - S22: rush-hour service between Teufen AR and Trogen.
  - S81: hourly service over the Bodensee–Toggenburg railway to Herisau.
  - S82: rush-hour service over the Bodensee–Toggenburg railway to Wittenbach.

On weekends (Friday and Saturday nights), there are also three nighttime S-Bahn services (SN21, SN22, SN72) offered by the Ostwind tariff network.

- SN21: hourly service to Winterthur.
- SN22: hourly service to Winterthur and Heerbrugg.
- SN72: hourly service to Lichtensteig and Romanshorn.

=== Bus ===
Several bus routes of Verkehrsbetriebe St. Gallen (VBSG, including four trolleybus lines), PostAuto and Regiobus depart from the station forecourt (Bahnhofplatz).

== See also ==
- History of rail transport in Switzerland
- Rail transport in Switzerland
