= St. Gallen S-Bahn =

Commuter rail network in St. Gallen, Switzerland

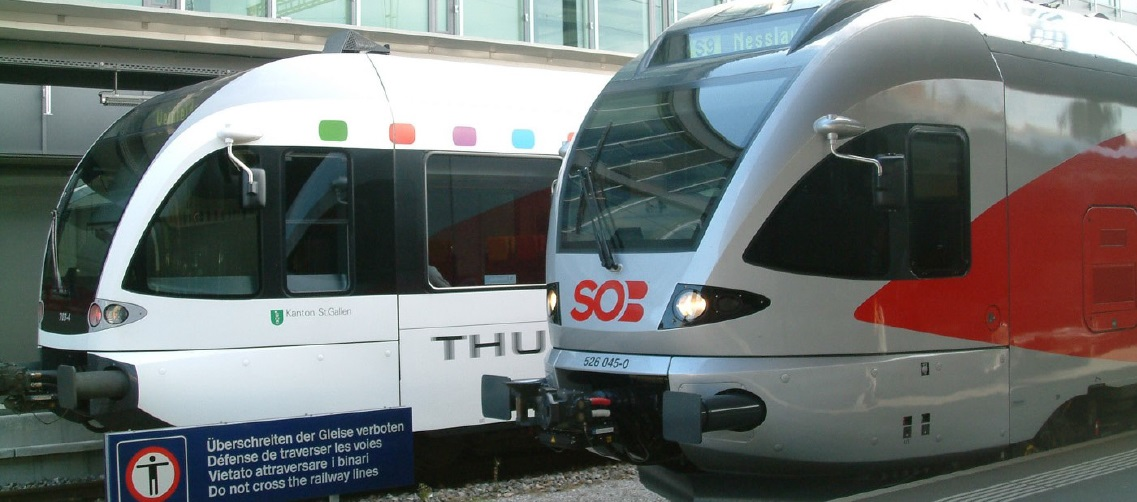
- Trains of Thurbo and SOB (above) and AB (below) operating for St. Gallen S-Bahn

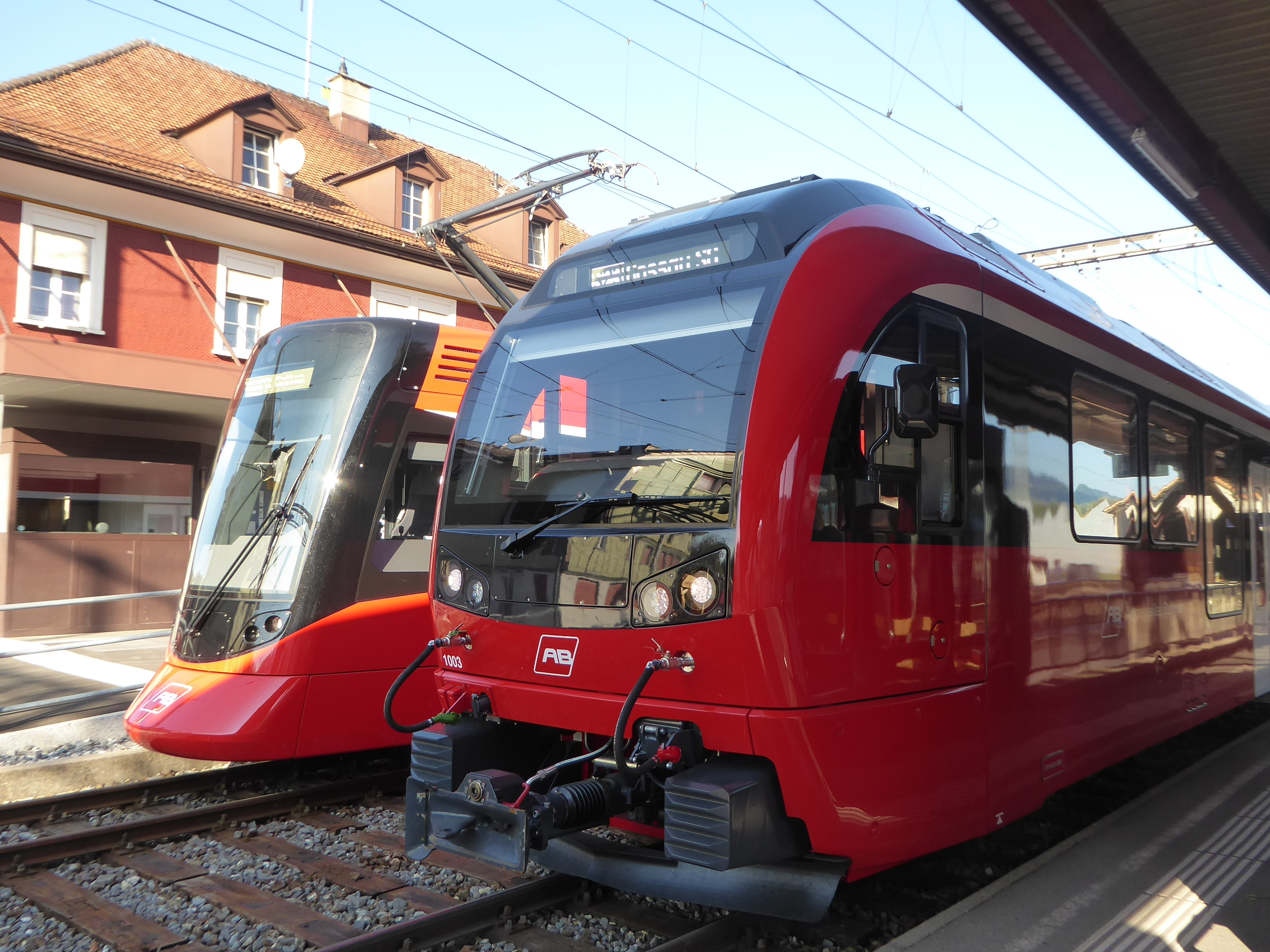

Overview
- Locale: Eastern Switzerland
- Transit type: S-Bahn
- Number of lines: 22
- Website: Ostwind.ch (in English)

Operation
- Began operation: 2001
- Operators: Appenzell Railways; Frauenfeld-Wil-Bahn AG; Südostbahn; Thurbo

Technical
- Track gauge: 1,435 mm (4 ft 8 1/2 in) standard gauge; 1,000 mm (3 ft 3 3/8 in) metre gauge; 1,200 mm (3 ft 11 1/4 in)

The St. Gallen S-Bahn (German: S-Bahn St. Gallen) is an S-Bahn-style commuter rail in Eastern Switzerland and neighbouring areas. The network connects stations in the Swiss cantons of Appenzell Ausserrhoden, Appenzell Innerrhoden, Glarus, Grisons, Schaffhausen, St. Gallen, Thurgau and Zurich, as well as a few stations in Austria (Bregenz, Vorarlberg) and Germany (Konstanz, Baden-Württemberg and Lindau, Bavaria). Some services also operate as part of the Bodensee S-Bahn.

Services are operated by Appenzeller Bahnen (AB), Südostbahn (SOB), and Thurbo. Within Switzerland and until Konstanz, services operate within the Tarifverbund Ostwind (Ostwind fare network) of northeastern Switzerland and Liechtenstein.

== Lines ==
=== S-Bahn ===
As of December 2023, the network consists of 22 lines, numbered 1‒2, 4‒7, 9‒10, 12, 14‒15, 17, 20‒26, 44 and 81‒82, using the "S" prefix typical for most S-Bahn systems. Only lines S1, S2, S4, S5, S20, S21, S22, S81 and S82 pass through or terminate in St. Gallen.

Unless stated otherwise, the lines are 1,435 mm or 4 ft 8 1/2 in standard gauge adhesion railways.

#	Route	Notes	Operator
S1	Wil SG–St. Gallen–Romanshorn–Kreuzlingen–Stein am Rhein–Schaffhausen	Operates every half hour	Thurbo
S2	Nesslau-Neu St. Johann–Herisau–St. Gallen–Rorschach–Altstätten SG		Thurbo
S4	Rapperswil–Uznach–Wattwil–St. Gallen–Buchs SG–Sargans	Does not call at stations between Rapperswil and Uznach	SOB
S5	Weinfelden–Bischofszell Stadt–Gossau SG–St. Gallen–St. Margrethen	Operates half-hourly between Weinfelden and Bischofszell Stadt and hourly to St. Margrethen. On weekdays, half-hourly service continues to St. Gallen. Does not call at Mörschwil	Thurbo
S6	Rapperswil–Blumenau–Schmerikon–Uznach–Ziegelbrücke–Schwanden (–Linthal)	Operates to Linthal only during off-peak hours	SOB
S7	(Weinfelden–) Romanshorn–Arbon–Rorschach (–St. Margrethen–Bregenz–Lindau-Reutin–Lindau-Insel)	Operates every two hours between Rorschach and Lindau-Insel only during weekends. Only Weinfelden–St. Margrethen is within the Ostwind transit district	Thurbo
S9	Wil SG–Bütschwil–Wattwil		Thurbo
S10	Wil SG–Weinfelden–Amriswil–Romanshorn		Thurbo
S12	Sargans–Bad Ragaz–Landquart–Chur	Only Sargans–Bad Ragaz is within the Ostwind transit district	Thurbo
S14	Weinfelden–Kreuzlingen–Konstanz		Thurbo
S15	Wil SG–Wängi–Frauenfeld	Operates over the metre (3 ft 3 3/8 in) gauge Frauenfeld–Wil line	AB (FWB)
S17	Rapperswil–Blumenau–Schmerikon–Uznach–Ziegelbrücke–Sargans	Introduced in 2023	SOB
S20	Appenzell–Gais–Bühler–Teufen AR–St. Gallen–Speicher–Trogen	Operates over the metre (3 ft 3 3/8 in) gauge Appenzell–St. Gallen–Trogen line. Rush-hour service, calls between Gais and St. Gallen only at Bühler, Teufen AR and Niederteufen	AB
S21	Appenzell–Gais–Bühler–Teufen AR–St. Gallen–Speicher–Trogen	Operates over the metre (3 ft 3 3/8 in) gauge Appenzell–St. Gallen–Trogen line	AB
S22	Teufen AR–St. Gallen–Speicher–Trogen	Operates over the metre (3 ft 3 3/8 in) gauge Appenzell–St. Gallen–Trogen line. Only during rush hour	AB
S23	Gossau SG–Herisau–Urnäsch–Appenzell–Wasserauen	Operates over the metre (3 ft 3 3/8 in) gauge Gossau–Wasserauen line	AB
S24	Altstätten Stadt–Gais	Operates over the metre (3 ft 3 3/8 in) gauge Altstätten–Gais line (part rack railway)	AB
S25	Rorschach Hafen–Rorschach–Heiden	Operates over the standard gauge Rorschach–Heiden line (part rack railway)	AB
S26	Rheineck–Walzenhausen	Operates over the 1,200 mm (3 ft 11 1/4 in) gauge Rheineck–Walzenhausen line (part rack railway)	AB
S44	Weinfelden–Kreuzlingen–Konstanz	Operates since December 2022, without intermediate stops and with connecting services to IC81 in Weinfelden	Thurbo
S81	Herisau–St. Gallen	Same trainset operates as Alpenrhein-Express (IR13) between Chur and St. Gallen	SOB (Thurbo until 2024)
S82	St. Gallen–Wittenbach	Operates only during rush hour	Thurbo

The following S-Bahn services operating within the Ostwind transit district and connecting with services of St. Gallen S-Bahn are not part of the latter:

- The S2 (Buchs SG‒Schaan-Vaduz‒Feldkirch), S3 (St. Margrethen‒Bregenz) and R5 (St. Margrethen‒Dornbirn/Feldkirch) services, operated by ÖBB, belong to the Vorarlberg S-Bahn network
- The S6 (Konstanz‒Engen), named Seehas, belongs to Bodensee S-Bahn
- The S2 (Ziegelbrücke‒Zurich Airport), S9 (Schaffhausen‒Uster), S12 (Schaffhausen/Wil‒Brugg AG), S23 (Romanshorn‒Zürich HB, peak-hour only), S24 (Thayngen/Weinfelden‒Zug), S25 (Linthal‒Zürich HB), S29 (Stein am Rhein‒Winterthur), S30 (Weinfelden‒Winterthur), S33 (Schaffhausen‒Winterthur), S35 (Wil‒Winterthur) and S40 (Rapperswil‒Einsiedeln) are part of Zurich S-Bahn network
- The S27 (Ziegelbrücke–Siebnen-Wangen), nicknamed March shuttle, is a peak-hour service operated by Südostbahn (SOB) which is not part of any S-Bahn network
- Three S-Bahn services (S62, S64, S65) between Schaffhausen and their respective German termini in Erzingen, Singen (Hohentwiel) and Jestetten, are operated by Thurbo/SBB GmbH and part of Schaffhausen S-Bahn

=== RegioExpress ===
A RegioExpress (RE) between Herisau and Konstanz (Germany), nicknamed der Konstanzer, supports the S-Bahn network. The S-Bahn network is further complemented by InterRegio (IR) services, such as the IR Voralpen-Express (operated by Südostbahn between St. Gallen and Luzern) and IR 13 of Swiss Federal Railways (Zürich HB–Winterthur–St. Gallen–Sargans–Chur), which stop at all major stations.

#	Route	Notes	Operator
RE1	Herisau–St. Gallen–Romanshorn–Kreuzlingen Hafen–Konstanz	Hourly RegioExpress (RE, express train) service supplementing the S-Bahn network. Continues as S14 from Konstanz	Thurbo

=== Nighttime services ===
During weekends, in the night from Friday to Saturday and from Saturday to Sunday, there are nighttime S-Bahn services (designated SN followed by the route number). As of the December 2024 timetable change, the following night routes existed:

- SN14: Weinfelden–Kreuzlingen–Konstanz
- SN15: Frauenfeld–Wil
- SN21: Winterthur–Wil–St. Gallen
- SN22: Winterthur–Wil–St. Gallen–Heerbrugg (not calling at stations between Winterthur and Wil)
- SN30: Winterthur–Frauenfeld–Weinfelden–Romanshorn
- SN71: Kreuzlingen–Romanshorn
- SN72: Lichtensteig–St. Gallen–Romanshorn

=== Previous services ===
- S3: St. Gallen–St. Margrethen (until 2021, merged with the former S5 into the current S5 of St. Gallen S-Bahn)
- S8: Schaffhausen–Romanshorn–St. Gallen (until 2021, merged with the former S1 into the current S1 of St. Gallen S-Bahn)
- S11: St. Gallen–Gossau SG–Wil SG (until 2018, operated only during peak hour)
- S55: Weinfelden–Sulgen–Gossau SG–St. Gallen (until 2018, operated only during peak hour)

== See also ==
- Transport in St. Gallen
