= Nesslau-Neu St. Johann railway station =

Railway station in Switzerland

Nesslau-Neu St. Johann
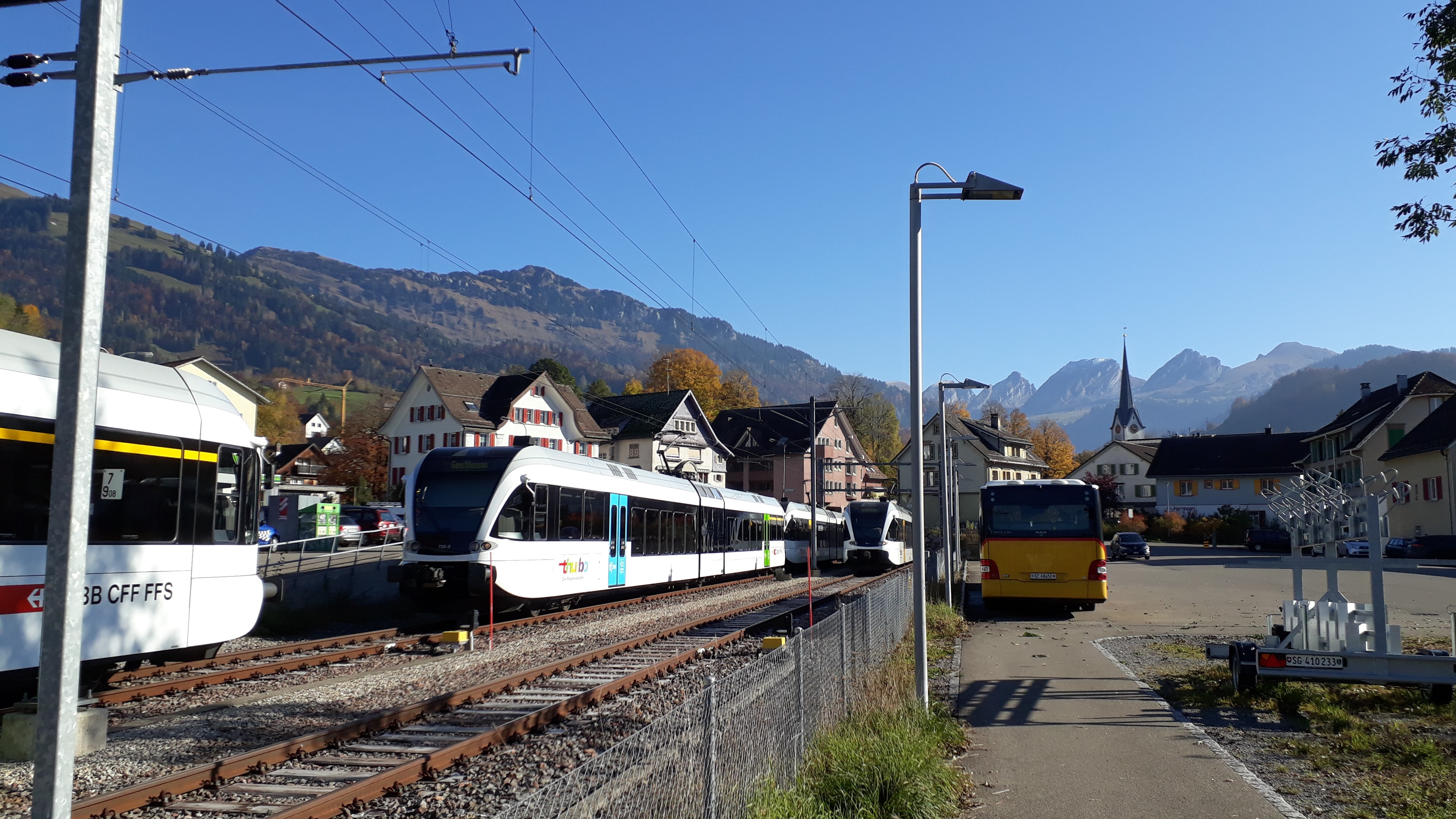
- Thurbo EMUs at Nesslau-Neu St. Johann in 2021

General information
- Location: Nesslau; Switzerland
- Coordinates: 47°13′36.4″N 9°11′51.5″E
- Elevation: 759 m (2,490 ft)
- Owner: Südostbahn
- Line: Bodensee–Toggenburg
- Platforms: 2 side platforms
- Tracks: 2
- Train operators: Thurbo
- Connections
- Bus: PostAuto bus routes 790 792

Other information
- Fare zone: 364 (Tarifverbund Ostwind)

Services
Preceding station	St. Gallen S-Bahn	Following station
Terminus	S2	Krummenau towards Altstätten SG
Location
- Location within Switzerland Location within Canton of St. Gallen

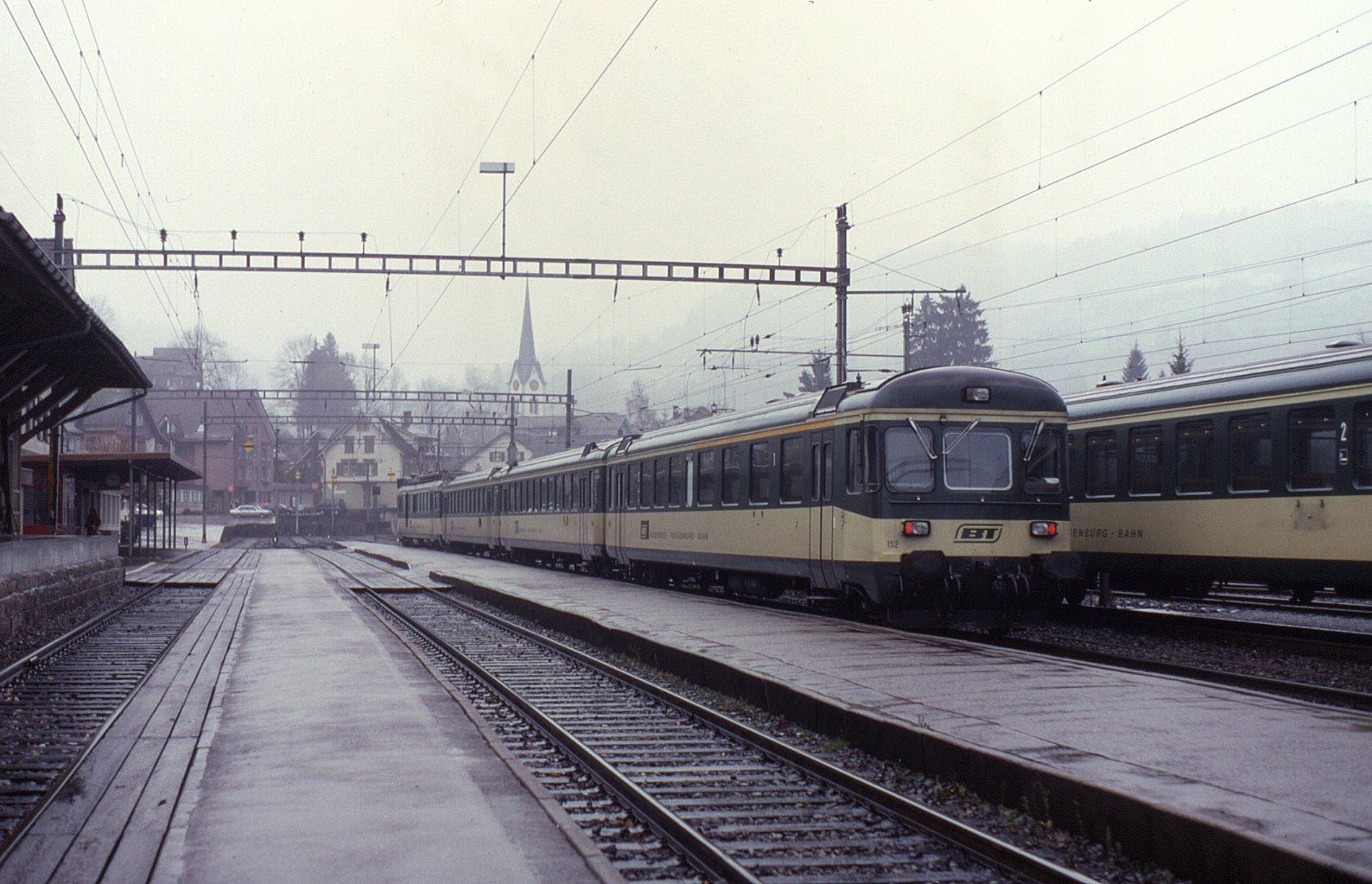
Historic Bodensee-Toggenburg-Bahn electric multiple unit at Nesslau-Neu St. Johann in 1998

Nesslau-Neu St. Johann railway station (German: Bahnhof Nesslau-Neu St. Johann) is a railway station in Nesslau, in the Swiss canton of St. Gallen. It is the southern terminus of the Bodensee–Toggenburg railway and is served by local trains only.

== Services ==
Nesslau-Neu St. Johann is served by the S2 regional train of St. Gallen S-Bahn:

- S2: hourly service over the Bodensee–Toggenburg railway to Altstätten SG, via St. Gallen.

PostAuto Schweiz bus services 790 and 792 call in front of the station building. Towards south, bus route 790 serves the valley station (in Unterwasser) of the Iltiosbahn to Iltios, from where a cable car continues to Chäserrugg mountain (Churfirsten). Line 792 serves the valley station of the Säntis Schwebebahn.

Line	Route	Operator
790	Wattwil railway station – Ebnat-Kappel railway station – Ebnat-Kappel, Gieselbach – Krummenau – Nesslau-Neu St. Johann railway station – Nesslau – Stein SG – Starkenbach SG – Alt St. Johann – Unterwasser – Wildhaus (– Gams – Grabs SG – Buchs SG railway station)	PostAuto Schweiz
792	Nesslau-Neu St. Johann railway station – Passhöhe – Säntis Schwebebahn (aerial lift to Säntis)	PostAuto Schweiz

== See also ==
- Rail transport in Switzerland
