= Bischofszell Nord railway station =

Railway station in Switzerland

Bischofszell Nord
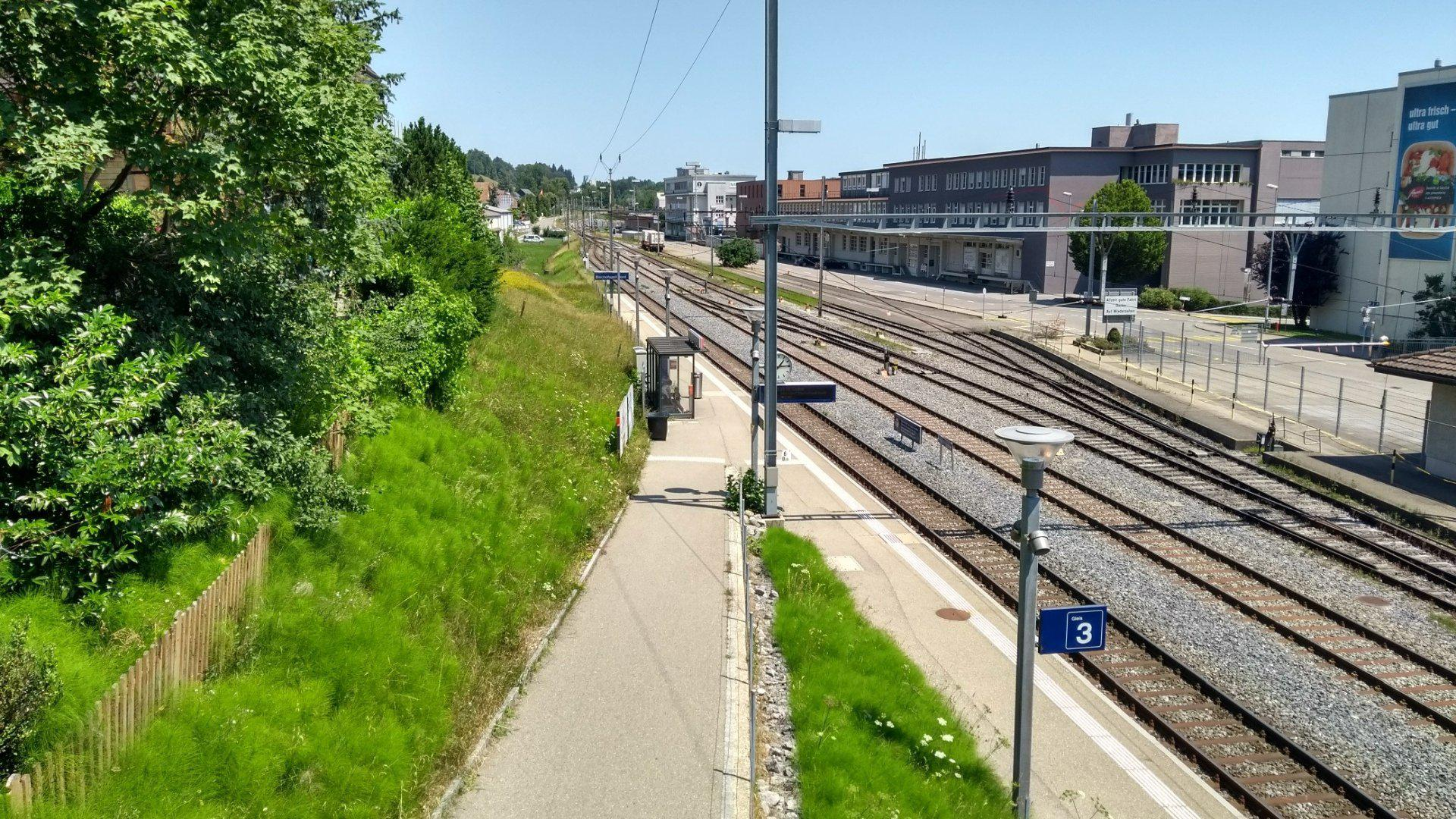
- The station platform in 2018

General information
- Location: Bischofszell; Switzerland
- Coordinates: 47°30′N 9°14′E
- Owner: Swiss Federal Railways
- Line: Sulgen–Gossau line
- Distance: 6.8 km (4.2 mi) from Sulgen
- Platforms: 1 side platform
- Tracks: 1
- Train operators: THURBO

Other information
- Fare zone: 229 (Tarifverbund Ostwind)

Services
Preceding station	St. Gallen S-Bahn	Following station
Kradolf towards Weinfelden	S5	Sitterdorf towards St. Margrethen
Location
- Location within Switzerland Location within Canton of Thurgau

Bischofszell Nord railway station (German: Bahnhof Bischofszell Nord) is a railway station in Bischofszell, in the Swiss canton of Thurgau. It is an intermediate stop on the Sulgen–Gossau line.

== Layout ==
Bischofszell Nord has a single 117-metre (384 ft) side platform for passenger service.

== Services ==
As of the December 2023 timetable change, the following services stop at Bischofszell Nord:

- St. Gallen S-Bahn S5: half-hourly service between Weinfelden and Bischofszell Stadt (weekends) or St. Gallen (weekdays); hourly service to St. Margrethen.
