= Arnegg railway station =

Railway station in Gossau, Switzerland

Arnegg
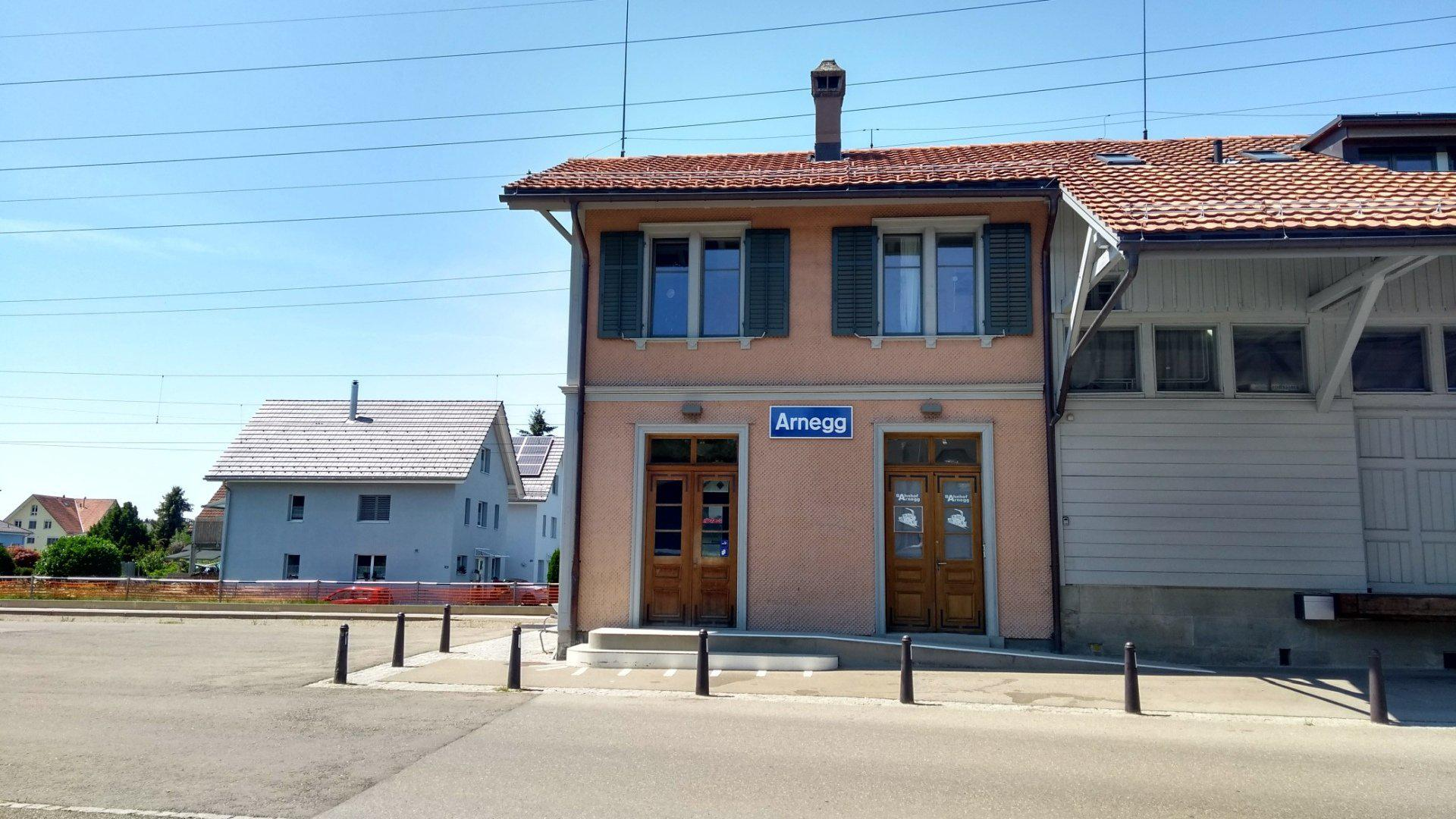
- The station building in 2018

General information
- Location: Gossau; Switzerland
- Coordinates: 47°26′N 9°15′E
- Owner: Swiss Federal Railways
- Line: Sulgen–Gossau line
- Distance: 18.6 km (11.6 mi) from Sulgen
- Train operators: THURBO
- Connections: Regiobus

Other information
- Fare zone: 212 (Tarifverbund Ostwind)

Services
Preceding station	St. Gallen S-Bahn	Following station
Hauptwil towards Weinfelden	S5	Gossau SG towards St. Margrethen
Location
- Location within Switzerland Location within Canton of St. Gallen

Arnegg railway station (German: Bahnhof Arnegg) is a railway station in Gossau, in the Swiss canton of St. Gallen. It is an intermediate stop on the Sulgen–Gossau line.

== Services ==
As of the December 2023 timetable change, the following services stop at Arnegg:

- St. Gallen S-Bahn S5: half-hourly (weekdays) or hourly (weekends) service between Weinfelden and St. Gallen; hourly service to St. Margrethen.
