= S5 (St. Gallen S-Bahn) =

Railway service in Switzerland

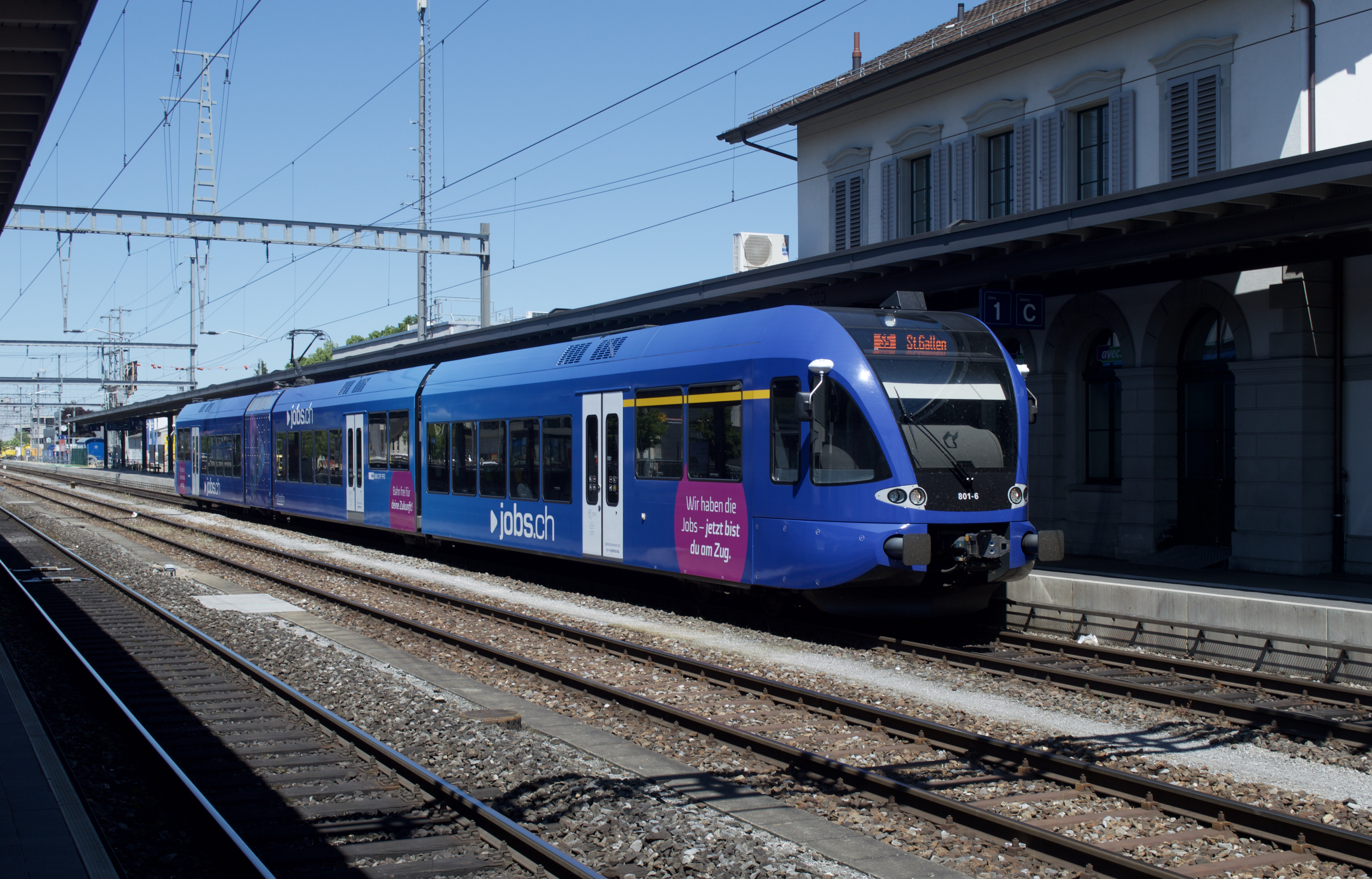
- A St. Gallen-bound S5 at Weinfelden in 2017

Overview
- Current operator(s): THURBO

Route
- Termini: Weinfelden; St. Margrethen
- Stops: 19
- Distance travelled: 67.1 kilometres (41.7 mi)
- Average journey time: 1 hour 18 minutes
- Service frequency: Hourly
- Line(s) used: Winterthur–Romanshorn line; Sulgen–Gossau line; St. Gallen–Winterthur line; Rorschach–St. Gallen line; Chur–Rorschach line

The S5 is a railway service of the St. Gallen S-Bahn that provides hourly or better service between Weinfelden and St. Margrethen, in the Swiss cantons of St. Gallen and Thurgau. The line is also part of the Bodensee S-Bahn. THURBO, a joint venture of Swiss Federal Railways and the canton of Thurgau, operates the service.

== Operations ==
The S5 operates half-hourly between Weinfelden and Bischofszell Stadt and hourly to St. Margrethen. On weekdays, half-hourly service continues to St. Gallen. The S5 does not serve Mörschwil. It uses the Winterthur–Romanshorn line on the section between Weinfelden and Sulgen, the Sulgen to Gossau line, the St. Gallen–Winterthur line between Gossau and St. Gallen, the Rorschach–St. Gallen line, and the Chur–Rorschach line between Rorschach and St. Margrethen.

== Route ==
S5 Weinfelden – Gossau SG – St. Gallen – Rorschach – St. Margrethen

- Weinfelden
- Bürglen
- Sulgen
- Kradolf
- Bischofszell Nord
- Sitterdorf
- Bischofszell Stadt
- Hauptwil
- Arnegg
- Gossau SG
- St. Gallen Winkeln
- St. Gallen Bruggen
- St. Gallen
- St. Gallen St. Fiden
- Goldach
- Rorschach Stadt
- Rorschach
- Staad
- Rheineck
- St. Margrethen

== History ==
Leading up to the December 2013 timetable change, the service pattern on the Sulgen–Gossau line was an hourly service (provided by the S5) between Weinfelden and St. Gallen, supplemented by additional trains during peak hours. The relaunched St. Gallen S-Bahn kept this service pattern and designated the additional peak services S55. The December 2018 timetable change eliminated the S55; service between Weinfelden and Bischofszell Stadt increased to half-hourly, with some of the additional trains continuing to St. Gallen.

The S5 was extended to St. Margrethen in December 2021, replacing the S3. Weekday service between Bischofszell Stadt and St. Gallen increased to half-hourly on 10 December 2023.
