= Sitterdorf railway station =

Railway station in Switzerland

Sitterdorf
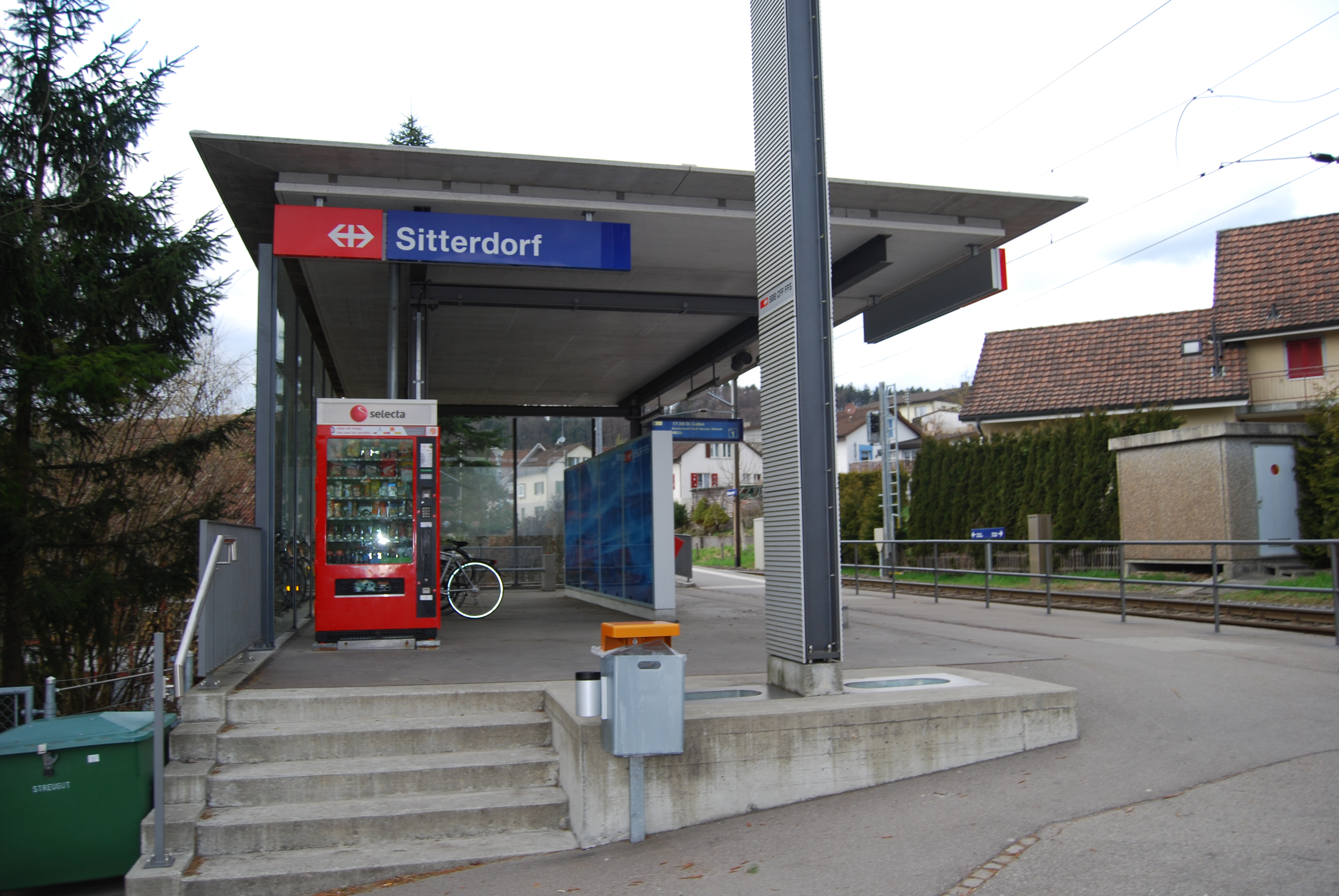
- The station platform at Sitterdorf in 2013

General information
- Location: Zihlschlacht-Sitterdorf; Switzerland
- Coordinates: 47°31′N 9°15′E
- Owner: Swiss Federal Railways
- Line: Sulgen–Gossau line
- Distance: 8.2 km (5.1 mi) from Sulgen
- Platforms: 1
- Tracks: 1
- Train operators: THURBO
- Connections: Bus Oberthurgau

Other information
- Fare zone: 229 (Tarifverbund Ostwind)

Services
| Preceding station | St. Gallen S-Bahn | Following station |
|---|---|---|
| Bischofszell Nord towards Weinfelden | S5 | Bischofszell Stadt towards St. Margrethen |
Location
- Location within Switzerland Location within Canton of Thurgau

Sitterdorf railway station (German: Bahnhof Sitterdorf) is a railway station in Zihlschlacht-Sitterdorf, in the Swiss canton of Thurgau. It is an intermediate stop on the Sulgen–Gossau line.

== Layout ==
Sitterdorf has a single 105-metre (344 ft) side platform serving one track.

== Services ==
As of the December 2023 timetable change, the following services stop at Sitterdorf:

- St. Gallen S-Bahn S5: half-hourly service between Weinfelden and Bischofszell Stadt (weekends) or St. Gallen (weekdays); hourly service to St. Margrethen.
