= Kradolf railway station =

Railway station in Switzerland

Kradolf
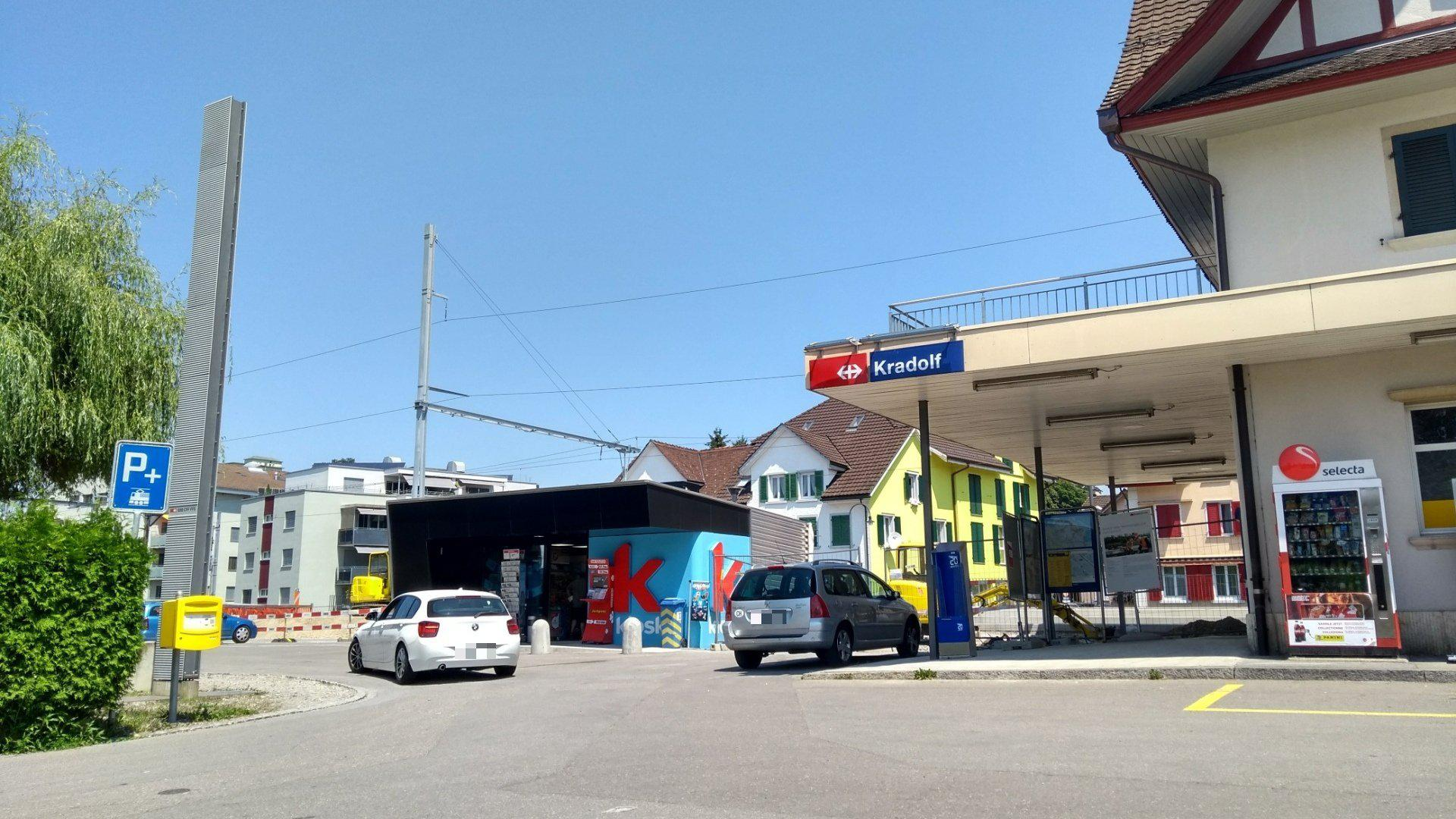
- The station in 2018

General information
- Location: Kradolf-Schönenberg; Switzerland
- Coordinates: 47°31′N 9°12′E
- Owner: Swiss Federal Railways
- Line: Sulgen–Gossau line
- Distance: 2.1 km (1.3 mi) from Sulgen
- Platforms: 2
- Tracks: 2
- Train operators: THURBO

Other information
- Fare zone: 924 (Tarifverbund Ostwind)

Services
Preceding station	St. Gallen S-Bahn	Following station
Sulgen towards Weinfelden	S5	Bischofszell Nord towards St. Margrethen
Location
- Location within Switzerland Location within Canton of Thurgau

Kradolf railway station (German: Bahnhof Kradolf) is a railway station in Kradolf-Schönenberg, in the Swiss canton of Thurgau. It is an intermediate stop on the Sulgen–Gossau line.

== Layout ==
Kradolf has two 120 metres (390 ft) side platforms serving two tracks.

== Services ==
As of the December 2023 timetable change, the following services stop at Kradolf:

- St. Gallen S-Bahn S5: half-hourly service between Weinfelden and Bischofszell Stadt (weekends) or St. Gallen (weekdays); hourly service to St. Margrethen.
