= Hauptwil railway station =

Railway station in Switzerland

Hauptwil
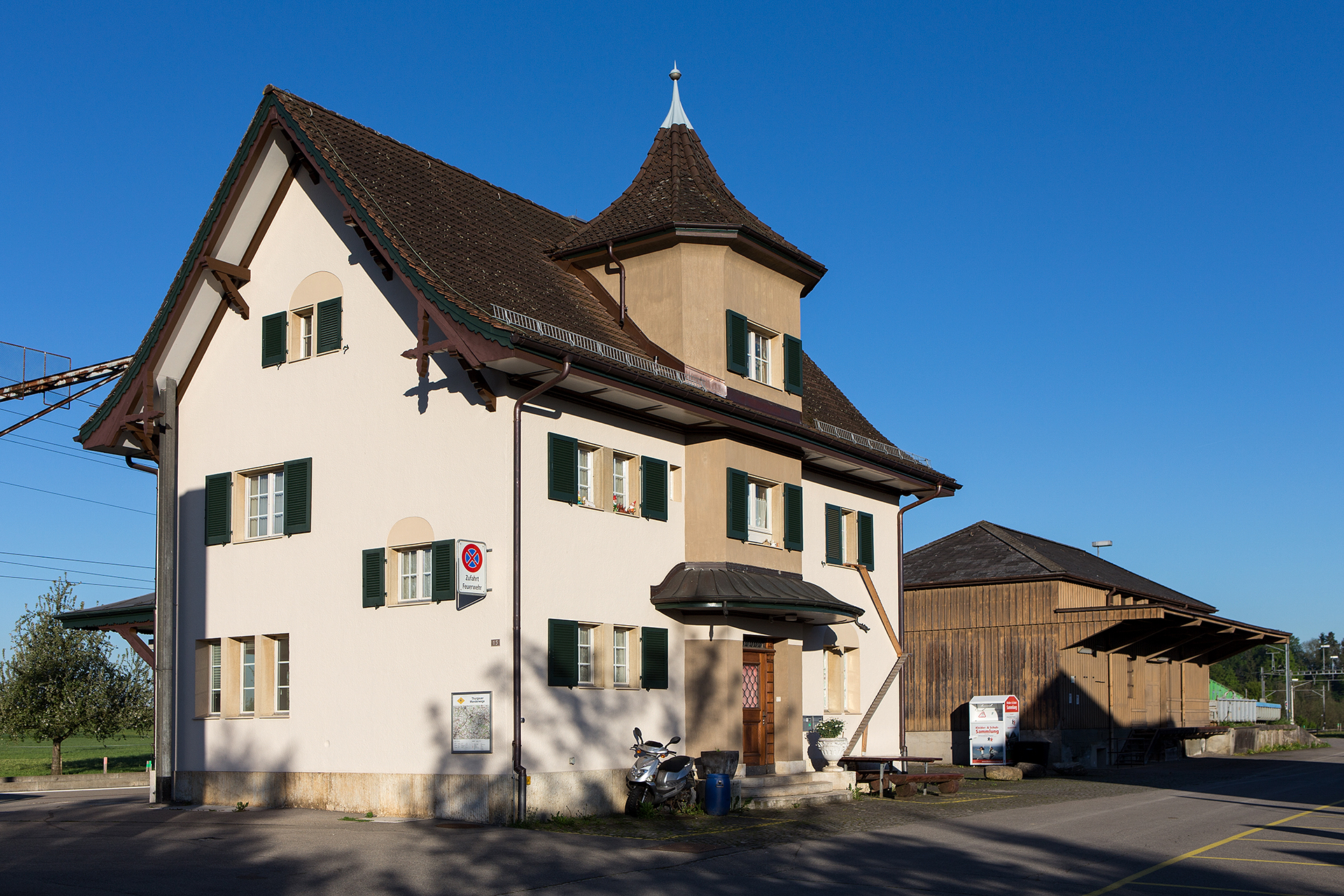
- The station building in 2017

General information
- Location: Hauptwil-Gottshaus; Switzerland
- Coordinates: 47°29′N 9°15′E
- Owner: Swiss Federal Railways
- Line: Sulgen–Gossau line
- Distance: 14.4 km (8.9 mi) from Sulgen
- Train operators: THURBO

Other information
- Fare zone: 229 (Tarifverbund Ostwind)

Services
Preceding station	St. Gallen S-Bahn	Following station
Bischofszell Stadt towards Weinfelden	S5	Arnegg towards St. Margrethen
Location
- Location within Switzerland Location within Canton of Thurgau

Hauptwil railway station (German: Bahnhof Hauptwil) is a railway station in Hauptwil-Gottshaus, in the Swiss canton of Thurgau. It is an intermediate stop on the Sulgen–Gossau line.

== Services ==
As of the December 2023 timetable change, the following services stop at Hauptwil:

- St. Gallen S-Bahn S5: half-hourly (weekdays) or hourly (weekends) service between Weinfelden and St. Gallen; hourly service to St. Margrethen.
