= Bürglen railway station =

Railway station in Switzerland

Bürglen
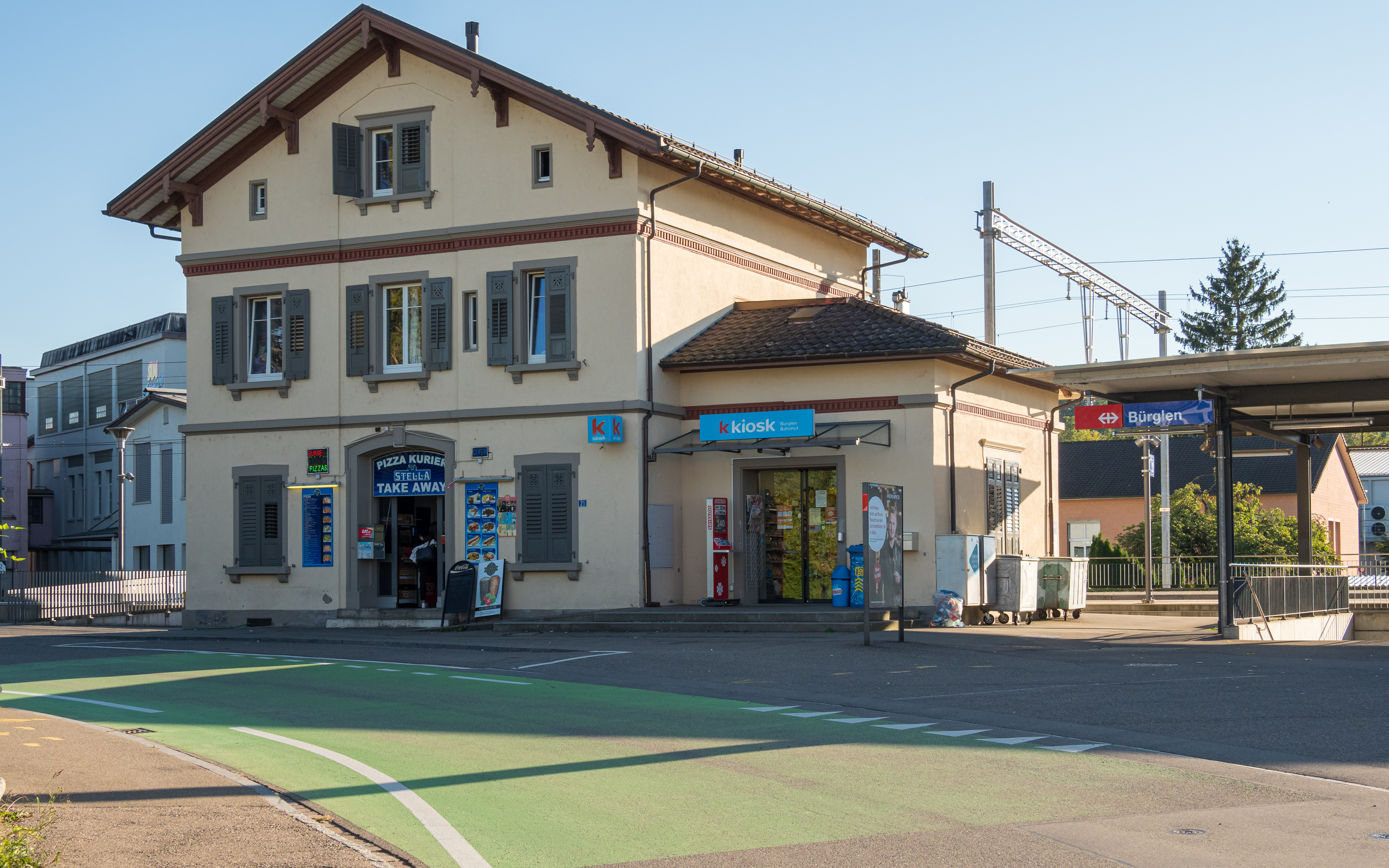
- The station building in 2021

General information
- Location: Bürglen; Switzerland
- Coordinates: 47°33′N 9°09′E
- Elevation: 440 m (1,440 ft)
- Owner: Swiss Federal Railways
- Line: Winterthur–Romanshorn line
- Distance: 63.3 km (39.3 mi) from Zürich HB
- Platforms: 2
- Tracks: 2
- Train operators: Thurbo

Other information
- Fare zone: 924 (Tarifverbund Ostwind)

Services
Preceding station	St. Gallen S-Bahn	Following station
Weinfelden Terminus	S5	Sulgen towards St. Margrethen
Weinfelden towards Wil	S10	Sulgen towards Romanshorn
Weinfelden towards Winterthur	SN30 Limited service	Sulgen towards Romanshorn
Location
- Location within Switzerland Location within Canton of Thurgau

Bürglen railway station (German: Bahnhof Bürglen) is a railway station in Bürglen, in the Swiss canton of Thurgau. It is an intermediate stop on the standard gauge Winterthur–Romanshorn line of Swiss Federal Railways.

== Layout ==
Bürglen has two platforms serving two tracks, numbered 2 and 3. The platform nearest the station building (Swiss Standard German: Hausperron) is 120 metres (390 ft) long. Across from it is a 127-metre (417 ft) side platform.

== Services ==
As of the December 2023 timetable change, the following services stop at Bürglen:

- St. Gallen S-Bahn:
  - S5: half-hourly service between Weinfelden and Bischofszell Stadt (weekends) or St. Gallen (weekdays); hourly service to St. Margrethen.
  - S10: half-hourly service between Wil and Romanshorn, via Weinfelden.

During weekends, the station is served by a nighttime S-Bahn service (SN30), offered by Ostwind fare network, and operated by Thurbo for St. Gallen S-Bahn.

- St. Gallen S-Bahn SN30: hourly service to Winterthur and to Romanshorn, via Frauenfeld.

== See also ==
- Bodensee S-Bahn
- Rail transport in Switzerland
