= Rorschach Stadt railway station =

Railway station in Rorschach, Switzerland

Rorschach Stadt
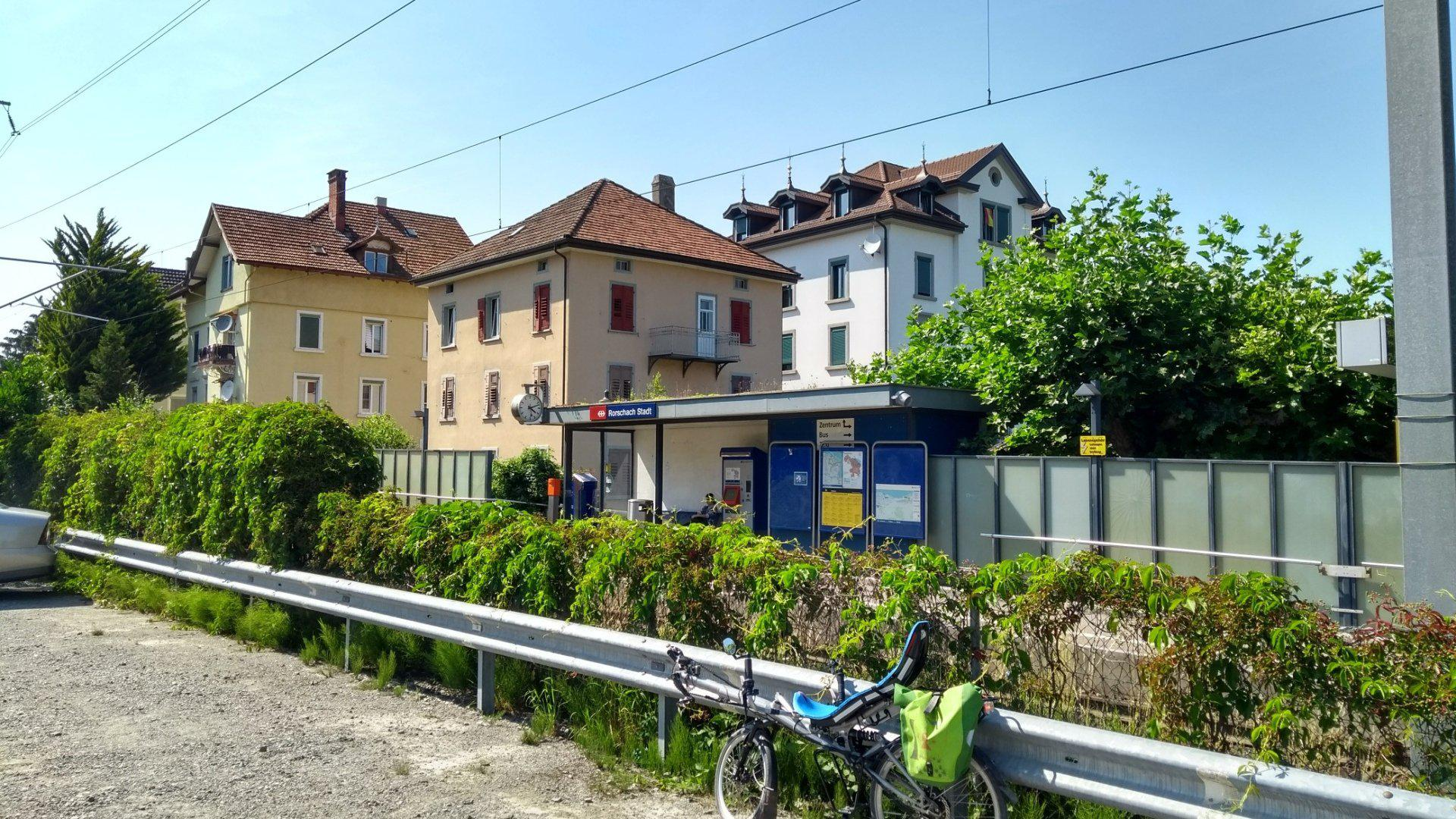
- The station in 2018

General information
- Location: Rorschach; Switzerland
- Coordinates: 47°29′N 9°29′E
- Elevation: 410 m (1,350 ft)
- Line: Rorschach–St. Gallen line
- Train operators: Thurbo; Südostbahn

Other information
- Fare zone: 231 (Tarifverbund Ostwind)

Services
Preceding station	St. Gallen S-Bahn	Following station
Goldach towards Nesslau-Neu St. Johann	S2	Rorschach towards Altstätten SG
Goldach towards Rapperswil	S4	Rorschach towards Sargans
Goldach towards Weinfelden	S5	Rorschach towards St. Margrethen
Mörschwil towards Winterthur	SN22 Limited service	Rorschach towards Heerbrugg
Location
- Location within Switzerland Location within Canton of St. Gallen

Rorschach Stadt railway station (German: Bahnhof Rorschach Stadt) is a railway station in Rorschach, in the Swiss canton of St. Gallen. It is an intermediate stop on the Rorschach–St. Gallen line. It is one of three stations within the municipality of Rorschach, along with Rorschach (the next station east on the same line) and Rorschach Hafen, approximately 400 metres (1,300 ft) to the north on the shore of Lake Constance.

== Services ==
As of the December 2023 timetable change, the following services stop at Rorschach Stadt:

- St. Gallen S-Bahn:
  - S2 / S4: half-hourly service between Wattwil and Altstätten SG via St. Gallen and hourly service to Rapperswil, Sargans, and Nesslau-Neu St. Johann.
  - S5: hourly service between Weinfelden and St. Margrethen.

During weekends, the station is served by a nighttime S-Bahn service (SN22), offered by Ostwind fare network, and operated by Thurbo for St. Gallen S-Bahn.

- St. Gallen S-Bahn:
  - SN22: hourly service to Winterthur and to Heerbrugg, via St. Gallen.

== See also ==
- Bodensee S-Bahn
- Rail transport in Switzerland
