= St. Gallen Bruggen railway station =

Railway station in Switzerland

St. Gallen Bruggen
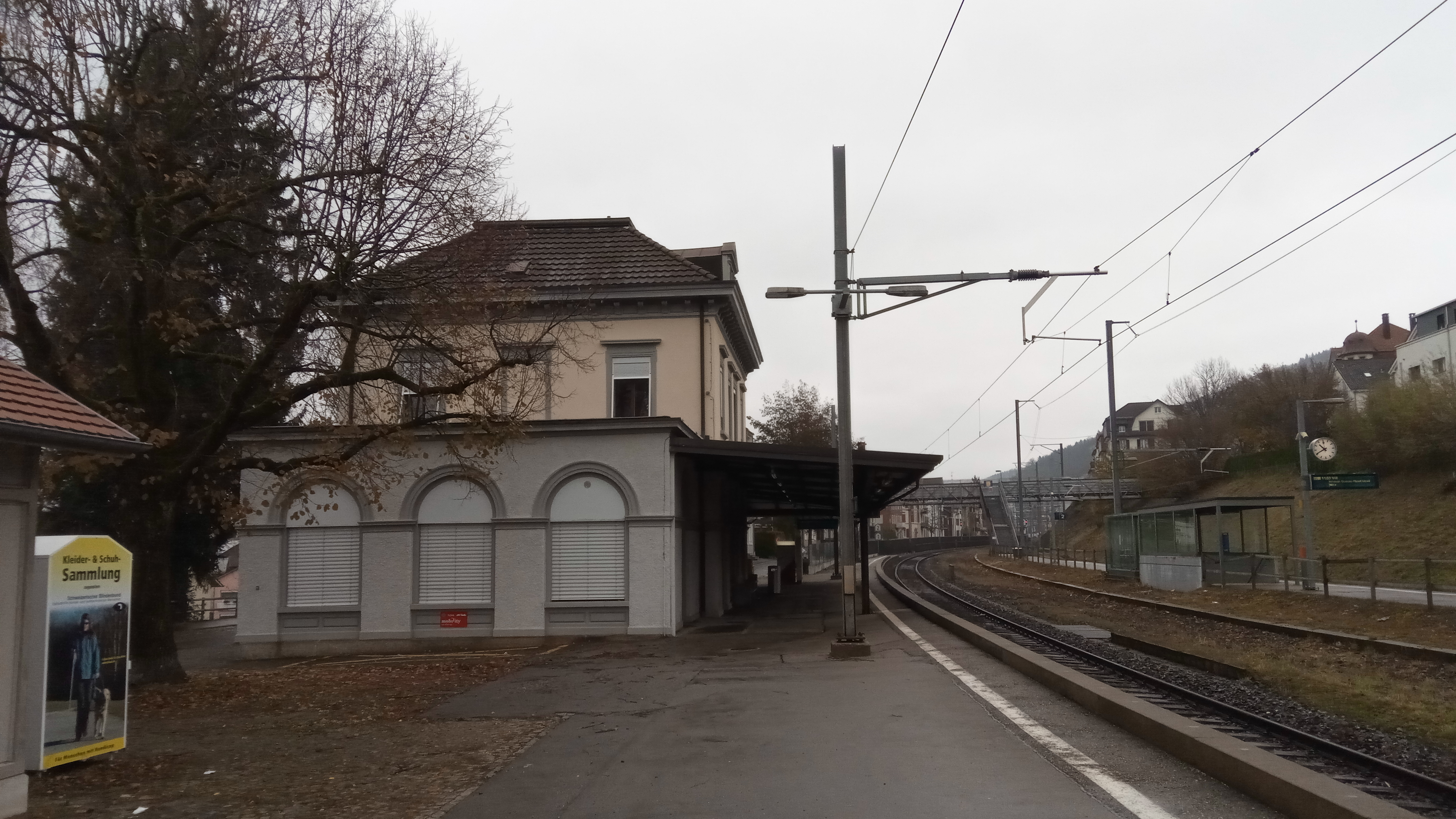
- The St. Gallen Bruggen station building in 2017

General information
- Location: St. Gallen; Switzerland
- Coordinates: 47°24′26″N 9°19′47″E
- Elevation: 651 m (2,136 ft)
- Owner: Swiss Federal Railways
- Line: St. Gallen–Winterthur line
- Distance: 84.1 km (52.3 mi) from Sargans
- Platforms: 2 side platforms
- Tracks: 2
- Train operators: Thurbo

Other information
- Fare zone: 210 (Tarifverbund Ostwind)

Passengers
- 2018: 380 per weekday

Services
Preceding station	St. Gallen S-Bahn	Following station
St. Gallen Winkeln towards Wil	S1	St. Gallen towards Schaffhausen
St. Gallen Winkeln towards Weinfelden	S5	St. Gallen towards St. Margrethen
St. Gallen Winkeln towards Winterthur	SN21 Limited service	St. Gallen Terminus
St. Gallen Winkeln towards Winterthur	SN22 Limited service	St. Gallen towards Heerbrugg
Location
- Location within Switzerland Location within Canton of St. Gallen

St. Gallen Bruggen railway station (German: Bahnhof St. Gallen Bruggen) is a railway station in the Bruggen neighborhood of the city of St. Gallen, in the Swiss canton of St. Gallen. It is an intermediate station on the St. Gallen–Winterthur line, located within fare zone 210 of the Ostwind fare network.

== Services ==
As of the December 2023 timetable change, the following rail services stop at St. Gallen Bruggen:

- St. Gallen S-Bahn:
  - S1: half-hourly service between Wil and Schaffhausen.
  - S5: half-hourly (weekdays) or hourly (weekends) service between Weinfelden and St. Gallen; hourly service to St. Margrethen.

During weekends, the station is served by two nighttime S-Bahn services (SN21, SN22), offered by Ostwind fare network, and operated by Thurbo for St. Gallen S-Bahn.

- St. Gallen S-Bahn:
  - SN21: hourly service to Winterthur and to St. Gallen.
  - SN22: hourly service to Winterthur and to Heerbrugg (via St. Gallen).

== See also ==
- Bodensee S-Bahn
- Rail transport in Switzerland
