= Bischofszell =

- Municipality
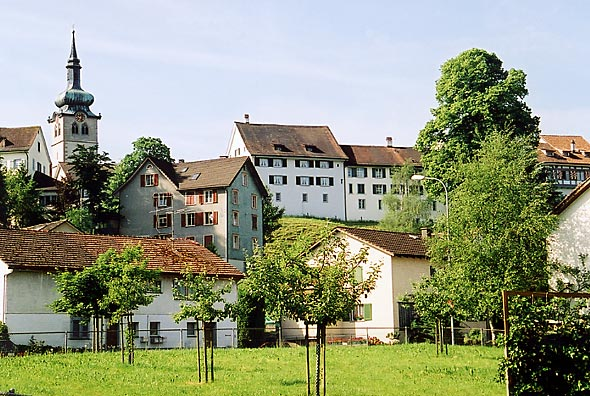
- Bischofszell

- Flag Coat of arms
- Location of Bischofszell
- Location within Switzerland Location within Canton of Thurgau
- Coordinates: 47°30′N 9°14′E
- Country: Switzerland
- Canton: Thurgau
- District: Weinfelden

Area
  - Total: 11.62 km^{2} (4.49 sq mi)
- Elevation: 506 m (1,660 ft)

Population (December 2007)
  - Total: 5,466
  - Density: 470.4/km^{2} (1,218/sq mi)
- Time zone: UTC+01:00 (CET)
  - Summer (DST): UTC+02:00 (CEST)
- Postal code: 9220
- SFOS number: 4471
- ISO 3166 code: CH-TG
- Surrounded by: Hauptwil-Gottshaus, Hohentannen, Kradolf-Schönenberg, Niederbüren (SG), Niederhelfenschwil (SG), Waldkirch (SG), Zihlschlacht-Sitterdorf
- Twin towns: Möhringen, Tuttlingen (Germany), Battaglia Terme (Italy), Waidhofen an der Ybbs (Austria), San Luis Obispo (United States of America)
- Website: www.bischofszell.ch

Bischofszell (Alemannic: Bischefzèl) is a village and a municipality in Weinfelden District in the canton of Thurgau in Switzerland. It is the seat of the district. In 1987, the city was awarded the Wakker Prize for the preservation of its architectural heritage. So was its neighboring city Hauptwil-Gottshaus in 1999.

== Geography ==
Bischofszell consists of two parts - the older elevated part and the newer more industrial part located to the north. The Sitter flows in the Thur directly outside Bischofszell. The forest to the south-east and the riverbanks are popular recreation areas. The closest bigger city and capital of the neighboring canton St. Gallen is about 30 minutes away by train or car.

Bischofszell has an area, as of 2009, of 11.62 square kilometers (4.49 sq mi). Of this area, 6.4 km^{2} (2.5 sq mi) or 55.1% is used for agricultural purposes, while 2.85 km^{2} (1.10 sq mi) or 24.5% is forested. Of the rest of the land, 2.06 km^{2} (0.80 sq mi) or 17.7% is settled (buildings or roads), 0.34 km^{2} (0.13 sq mi) or 2.9% is either rivers or lakes and 0.03 km^{2} (7.4 acres) or 0.3% is unproductive land.

Of the built up area, industrial buildings made up 8.3% of the total area while housing and buildings made up 2.2% and transportation infrastructure made up 0.9%. while parks, green belts and sports fields made up 5.9%. Out of the forested land, 22.5% of the total land area is heavily forested and 2.1% is covered with orchards or small clusters of trees. Of the agricultural land, 47.4% is used for growing crops, while 7.7% is used for orchards or vine crops. All the water in the municipality is flowing water.

The municipality is situated in Weinfelden District. It is located at the confluence of the Thur and Sitter, and includes the terrace south of the river. It consists of the town of Bischofszell-Nord/Sittertal and Bischofszell as well as Halden and part of Schweizersholz and Gottshaus (Stocken).

== Demographics ==
Bischofszell has a population (as of December 2020) of 5,907. As of 2008, 22.3% of the population are foreign nationals. Over the last 10 years (1997–2007) the population has changed at a rate of -0.6%. Most of the population (as of 2000) speaks German (85.4%), with Portuguese being second most common ( 3.7%) and Serbo-Croatian being third ( 2.7%).

As of 2008, the gender distribution of the population was 49.5% male and 50.5% female. The population was made up of 2,047 Swiss men (37.3% of the population), and 673 (12.3%) non-Swiss men. There were 2,221 Swiss women (40.4%), and 551 (10.0%) non-Swiss women.

In 2008 there were 31 live births to Swiss citizens and 11 births to non-Swiss citizens, and in same time span there were 57 deaths of Swiss citizens and 2 non-Swiss citizen deaths. Ignoring immigration and emigration, the population of Swiss citizens decreased by 26 while the foreign population increased by 9. There were 2 Swiss men who emigrated from Switzerland to another country, 33 non-Swiss men who emigrated from Switzerland to another country and 31 non-Swiss women who emigrated from Switzerland to another country. The total Swiss population change in 2008 (from all sources) was a decrease of 26 and the non-Swiss population change was an increase of 24 people. This represents a population growth rate of 0.0%.

The age distribution, as of 2009, in Bischofszell is; 507 children or 9.2% of the population are between 0 and 9 years old and 740 teenagers or 13.4% are between 10 and 19. Of the adult population, 744 people or 13.4% of the population are between 20 and 29 years old. 705 people or 12.7% are between 30 and 39, 915 people or 16.5% are between 40 and 49, and 693 people or 12.5% are between 50 and 59. The senior population distribution is 551 people or 10.0% of the population are between 60 and 69 years old, 391 people or 7.1% are between 70 and 79, there are 232 people or 4.2% who are between 80 and 89, and there are 58 people or 1.0% who are 90 and older.

As of 2000, there were 2,198 private households in the municipality, and an average of 2.4 persons per household. In 2000 there were 656 single family homes (or 73.0% of the total) out of a total of 899 inhabited buildings. There were 92 two family buildings (10.2%), 51 three family buildings (5.7%) and 100 multi-family buildings (or 11.1%). There were 1,218 (or 22.5%) persons who were part of a couple without children, and 3,010 (or 55.5%) who were part of a couple with children. There were 249 (or 4.6%) people who lived in single parent home, while there are 42 persons who were adult children living with one or both parents, 12 persons who lived in a household made up of relatives, 43 who lived in a household made up of unrelated persons, and 129 who are either institutionalized or live in another type of collective housing.

The vacancy rate for the municipality, in 2008, was 1.49%. As of 2007, the construction rate of new housing units was 2.2 new units per 1000 residents. In 2000 there were 2,516 apartments in the municipality. The most common apartment size was the 4 room apartment of which there were 736. There were 111 single room apartments and 355 apartments with six or more rooms. As of 2000 the average price to rent an average apartment in Bischofszell was 908.22 Swiss francs (CHF) per month (US$730, £410, €580 approx. exchange rate from 2000). The average rate for a one-room apartment was 494.53 CHF (US$400, £220, €320), a two-room apartment was about 654.29 CHF (US$520, £290, €420), a three-room apartment was about 797.11 CHF (US$640, £360, €510) and a six or more room apartment cost an average of 1393.10 CHF (US$1110, £630, €890). The average apartment price in Bischofszell was 81.4% of the national average of 1116 CHF.

The historical population is given in the following table:

year	population
1634	c. 550
1773	c. 950
1831	923
1850	1,303
1880	2,114
1900	2,618
1910	3,192
1950	3,567
1980	3,990
1990	4,563
2000	5,421

== Heritage sites of national significance ==
There are seven sites that are listed as Swiss heritage site of national significance. Two houses, the Daller House, the double house Rebstock / Rosenstock are included on the list, as is the former paper factory with paper machines. The house and the map collection of the Dr. Albert Knoepfli collection in the Museum Bischofszell, the Catholic Church of St Pelagius with St. Michaels Chapel, the Rathaus (Town council house) and Alte Thurbrücke make up the rest of the list. The entire city of Bischofszell is part of the Inventory of Swiss Heritage Sites. The Rathaus was built in 1747-50 by Gaspare Bagnato and is on Reichenau Island. The catholic parish church of St. Pelagius dates from the 9th Century.

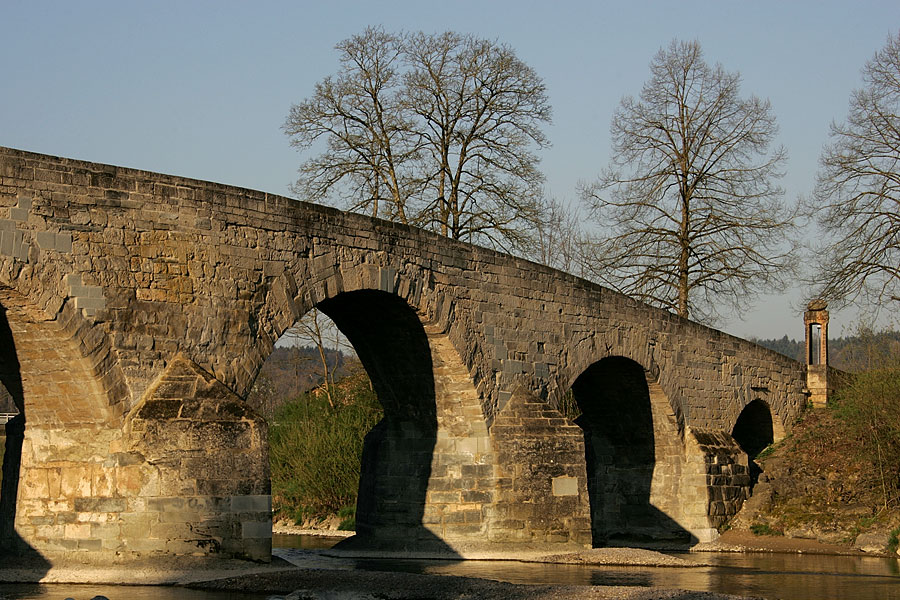
Alte Thurbrücke (Bridge)

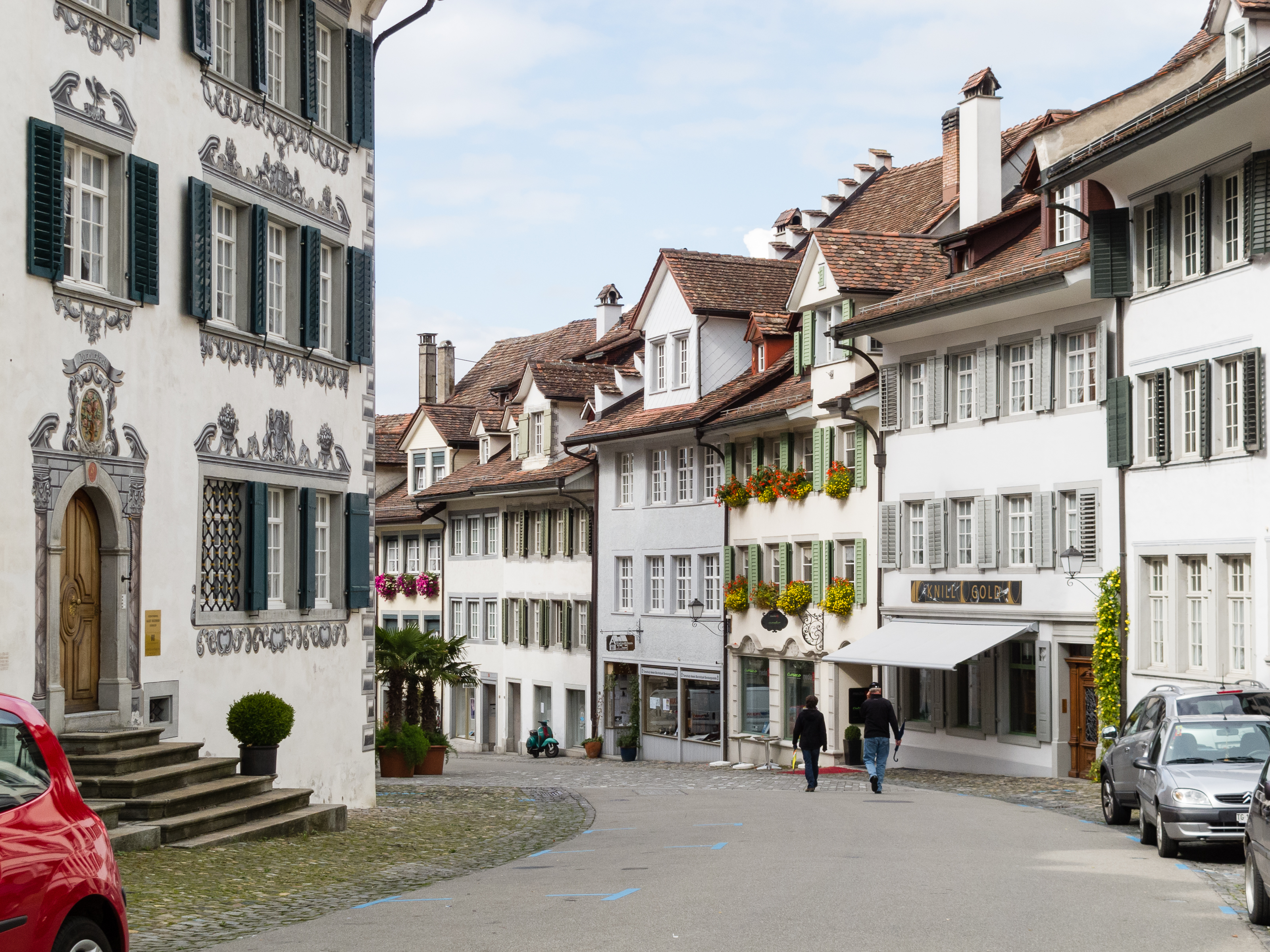
Marktgasse

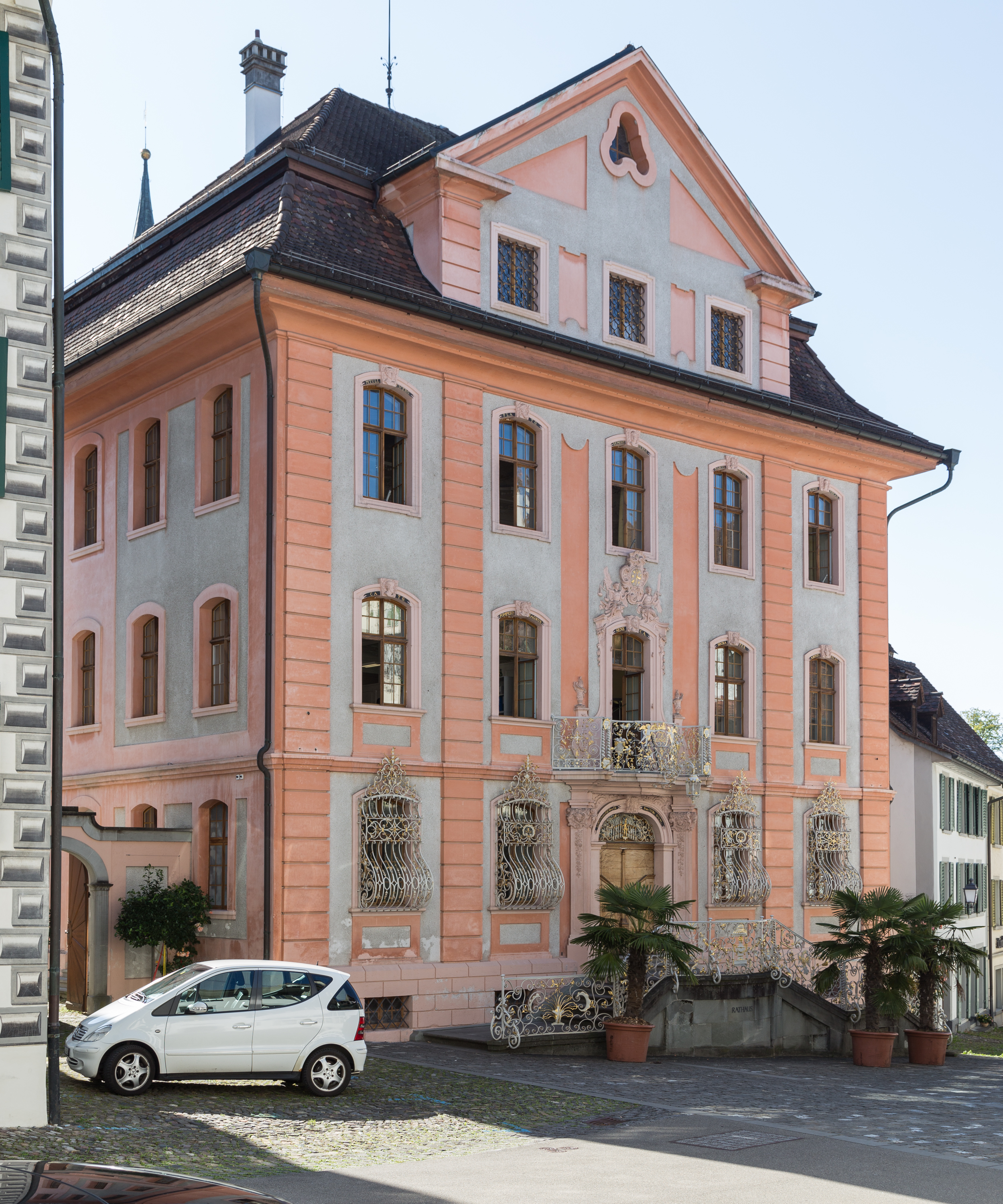
Town council house

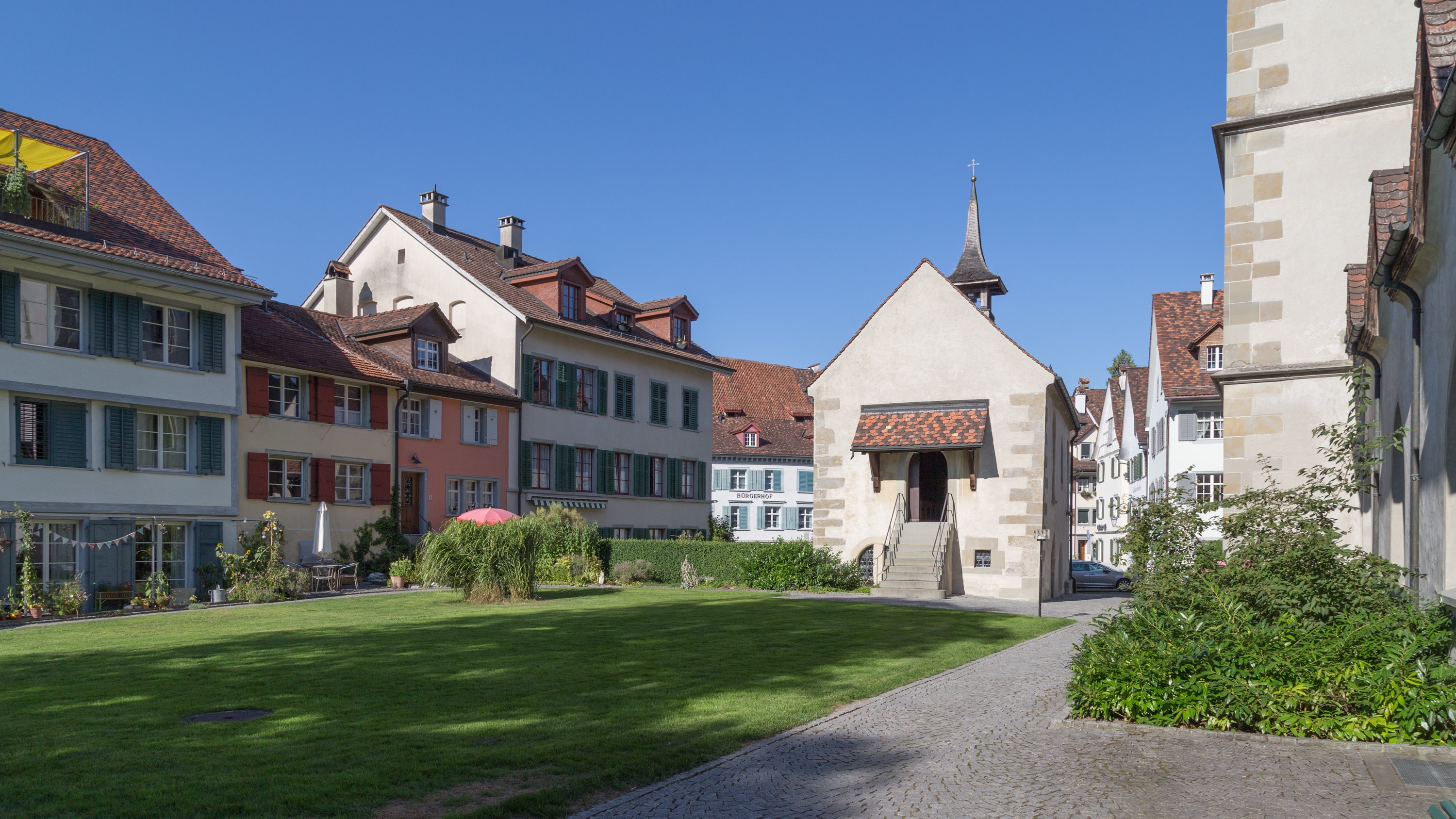
Chapelle of St. Michael and Schottengasse

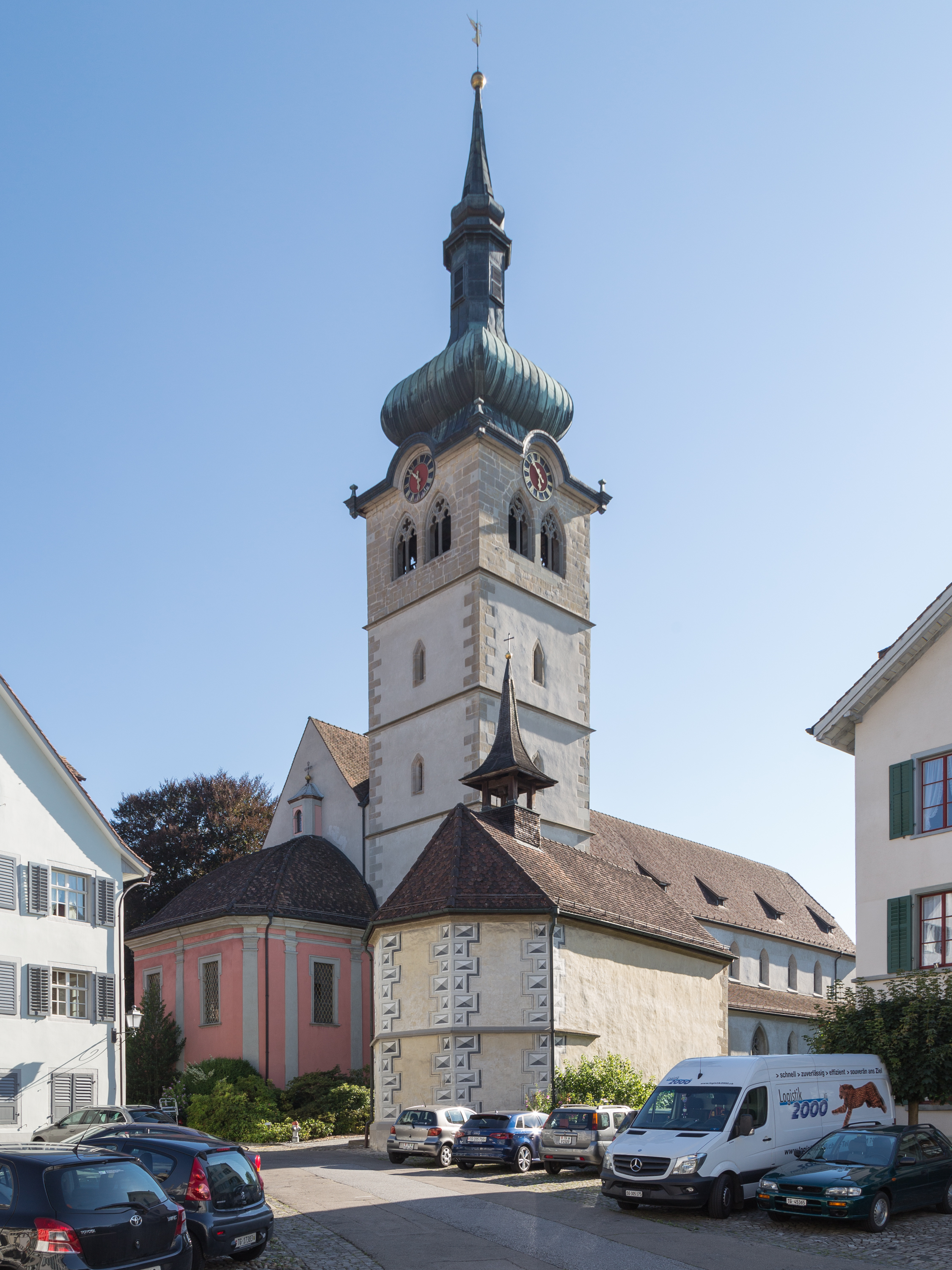
St. Pelagius church

=== Culture and sightseeing ===
The old part of Bischofszell contains many historical buildings such as the eponymous former bishop's residence. During the annual "Rosen- und Kulturwoche" (roses and culture week) at the end of June a large part of this town section is decorated over 40 arrangements of roses and hosts cultural events such as concerts or balls. During Easter numerous wells in Bischofszell are decorated with Easter motives. The annual rafting race in May also crosses through Bischofszell. The large weir is an interesting spot in the race and the bridge directly above makes a popular place to watch the rafts.

Other notable sight include:

- The "Thurbrücke" - one of the most notable bridges from the late middle-ages in Switzerland.
- The "Bogenturm" - the eastern gate and guardtower of the old Bischofszell.
- The reformed church building built between 1968 and 69 from designs by Benedikt Huber.

== Economy ==
As of 2007, Bischofszell had an unemployment rate of 2.4%. As of 2005, there were 117 people employed in the primary economic sector and about 40 businesses involved in this sector. 1,522 people are employed in the secondary sector and there are 66 businesses in this sector. 1,463 people are employed in the tertiary sector, with 196 businesses in this sector.

In 2000 there were 3,612 workers who lived in the municipality. Of these, 1,283 or about 35.5% of the residents worked outside Bischofszell while 1,429 people commuted into the municipality for work. There were a total of 3,758 jobs (of at least 6 hours per week) in the municipality. Of the working population, 8.2% used public transportation to get to work, and 42.8% used a private car.

The principal industries in Bischofszell include:

- "Bischofszell Nahrungsmittel AG" (Bischofszell Food Corp.) belonging to Migros produces a wide variety of products like fruit juices, jams, canned food, convenience food and non-soda beverages for the nationwide supermarket chain Migros and for export.
- "Molkerei Biedermann AG" (Dairy Biedermann Corp.) produces bio dairy products for numerous national (such as Coop and Migros) and international clients.

== Religion ==
From the 2000 census, 2,266 or 41.8% were Roman Catholic, while 1,895 or 35.0% belonged to the Swiss Reformed Church. Of the rest of the population, there were 2 Old Catholics (or about 0.04% of the population) who belonged to the Christian Catholic Church of Switzerland there are 104 individuals (or about 1.92% of the population) who belong to the Orthodox Church, and there are 218 individuals (or about 4.02% of the population) who belong to another Christian church. There were 4 individuals (or about 0.07% of the population) who were Jewish, and 409 (or about 7.54% of the population) who are Islamic. There are 15 individuals (or about 0.28% of the population) who belong to another church (not listed on the census), 308 (or about 5.68% of the population) belong to no church, are agnostic or atheist, and 200 individuals (or about 3.69% of the population) did not answer the question.

== Education ==
The entire Swiss population is generally well-educated. In Bischofszell about 64% of the population (between age 25–64) have completed either non-mandatory upper secondary education or additional higher education (either university or a Fachhochschule).

Bischofszell is home to the Bischofszell primary and secondary school district. In the 2008/2009 school year there were 1,173 students at either the primary or secondary levels. There were 211 children in the kindergarten, and the average class size was 19.18 kindergartners. Of the children in kindergarten, 107 or 50.7% were female, 41 or 19.4% were not Swiss citizens and 44 or 20.9% were not native German speakers. The lower and upper primary levels begin at about age 5-6 and lasts for 6 years. There were 351 children in who are at the lower primary level and 396 children in the upper primary level. The average class size in the primary school was 20.19 students. At the lower primary level, there were 160 children or 45.6% of the total population who were female, 50 or 14.2% were not Swiss citizens and 52 or 14.8% were not native speakers of German. In the upper primary level, there were 203 or 51.3% who were female, 65 or 16.4% were not Swiss citizens and 68 or 17.2% were not native German speakers.

At the secondary level, students are divided according to performance. The secondary level begins at about age 12 and usually lasts 3 years. There are 246 teenagers who are in the advanced school, of which 132 or 53.7% are female, 28 or 11.4% are not Swiss citizens and 29 or 11.8% do not speak German natively. There are 172 teenagers who are in the standard school, of which 77 or 44.8% are female, 48 or 27.9% are not Swiss citizens and 57 or 33.1% do not speak German natively. Finally, there are 8 teenagers who are in special or remedial classes, of which 3 or 37.5% are female, 4 or 50.0% are not Swiss citizens and 3 or 37.5% do not speak German natively. The average class size for all classes at the secondary level is 19 students.

== Transport ==
Bischofszell is located on the Sulgen–Gossau railway and has two stations: Bischofszell Nord and Bischofszell Stadt. Both are served by the St. Gallen S-Bahn.

== Twin towns ==
Bischoffszell is twinned with:

- Battaglia Terme, Veneto, Italy
- Tuttlingen, Baden-Württemberg, Germany
- Waidhofen an der Ybbs, Lower Austria

== Notable residents ==
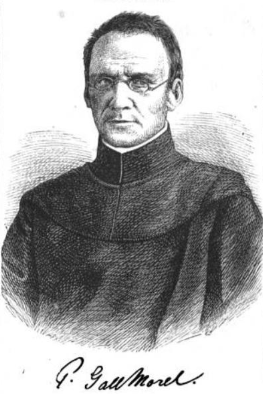
Gall Morel, 1872

- Fridolin Sicher (1490 in Bischofszell – 1546) composer and organist of the Renaissance era
- Ulrich Hugwald (1496 in Wilen – 1571) a Swiss humanist scholar and Reformer
- Johannes Zwick (c.1496 – 1542 in Bischofszell) a German Reformer and hymnwriter, died of the plague
- Ludwig Haetzer (1500 in Bischofszell – 1529) an Anabaptist linked to the Protestant reformation.
- Theodore Bibliander (1509 in Bischofszell – 1564) a Swiss orientalist, publisher, Protestant reformer and linguist
- Melchior Goldast (1576 or 1578 near Bischofszell - 1635) a Swiss jurist, a collector of documents relating to the medieval history of Germany and a Calvinist writer.
- Gall Morel (1803 in St. Fiden – 1872) a poet, scholar, aesthete and educationist.
- Eduard de Muralt (1808 in Bischofszell – 1895) a professor of theology, librarian, and paleographer
- Karl Otto Hunziker (1841 – 1909 in Bischofszell) a Swiss professor of pedagogy, pastor and politician.
- Amir Abrashi (born 1990 in Bischofszell) an Albanian professional footballer
