= St. Gallen Winkeln railway station =

Railway station in Switzerland

St. Gallen Winkeln
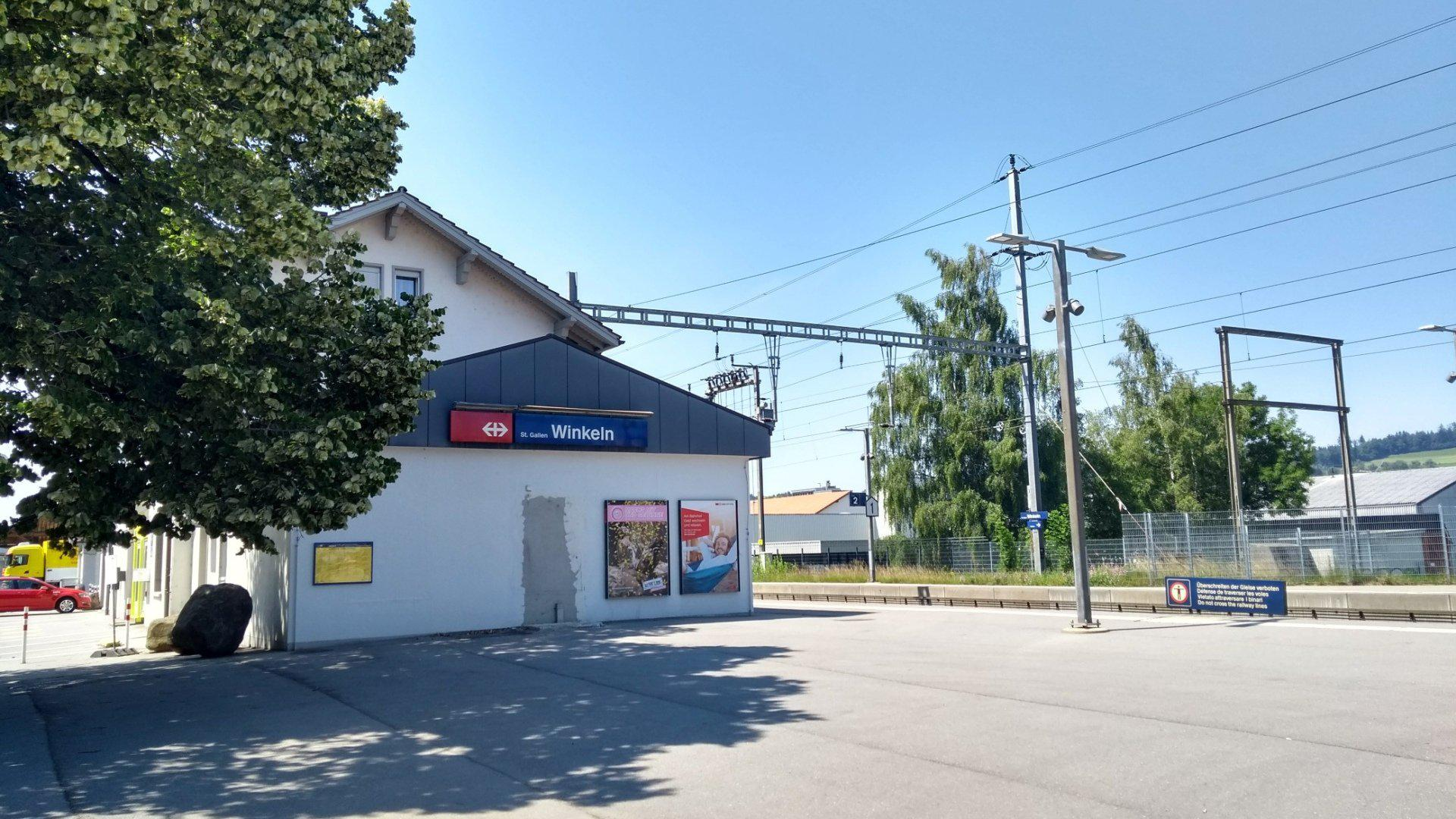
- The station building in 2018

General information
- Location: St. Gallen; Switzerland
- Coordinates: 47°24′14″N 9°18′03″E
- Elevation: 654 m (2,146 ft)
- Owner: Swiss Federal Railways
- Line: St. Gallen–Winterthur line
- Distance: 86.4 km (53.7 mi) from Sargans
- Train operators: Thurbo
- Connections: Ostwind tariff network
- Trolleybus: VBSG trolleybus line 1
- Bus: VBSG bus line 2; Regiobus lines 151 158

Other information
- Fare zone: 210 and 211 (Tarifverbund Ostwind)

Passengers
- 2018: 1,200 per weekday

Services
Preceding station	St. Gallen S-Bahn	Following station
Gossau SG towards Wil	S1	St. Gallen Bruggen towards Schaffhausen
Gossau SG towards Weinfelden	S5	St. Gallen Bruggen towards St. Margrethen
Gossau SG towards Winterthur	SN21 Limited service	St. Gallen Bruggen towards St. Gallen
Gossau SG towards Winterthur	SN22 Limited service	St. Gallen Bruggen towards Heerbrugg
Location
- Location within Switzerland Location within Canton of St. Gallen

St. Gallen Winkeln railway station (German: Bahnhof St. Gallen Winkeln) is a railway station in the Winkeln neighborhood of the city of St. Gallen, in the Swiss canton of St. Gallen. It is an intermediate stop on the St. Gallen–Winterthur line, located within both fare zones 210 and 211 of the Ostwind fare network.

== Services ==
=== S-Bahn ===
The station is only served by S-Bahn trains. As of the December 2023 timetable change, the following rail services stop at St. Gallen Winkeln:

- St. Gallen S-Bahn:
  - S1: half-hourly service between Wil and Schaffhausen.
  - S5: half-hourly (weekdays) or hourly (weekends) service between Weinfelden and St. Gallen; hourly service to St. Margrethen.

During weekends, the station is served by two nighttime S-Bahn services (SN21, SN22), offered by Ostwind fare network, and operated by Thurbo for St. Gallen S-Bahn.

- St. Gallen S-Bahn:
  - SN21: hourly service to Winterthur and to St. Gallen.
  - SN22: hourly service to Winterthur and to Heerbrugg (via St. Gallen).

=== Bus ===
There are two nearby bus stops, Winkeln, Bhf. Nord and Winkeln, Bhf. Süd, which are served by bus routes of Verkehrsbetriebe St. Gallen (VBSG, including one trolleybus line), and Regiobus.

== See also ==
- Bodensee S-Bahn
- Rail transport in Switzerland
