= Wittenbach railway station =

Railway station in Switzerland

Wittenbach
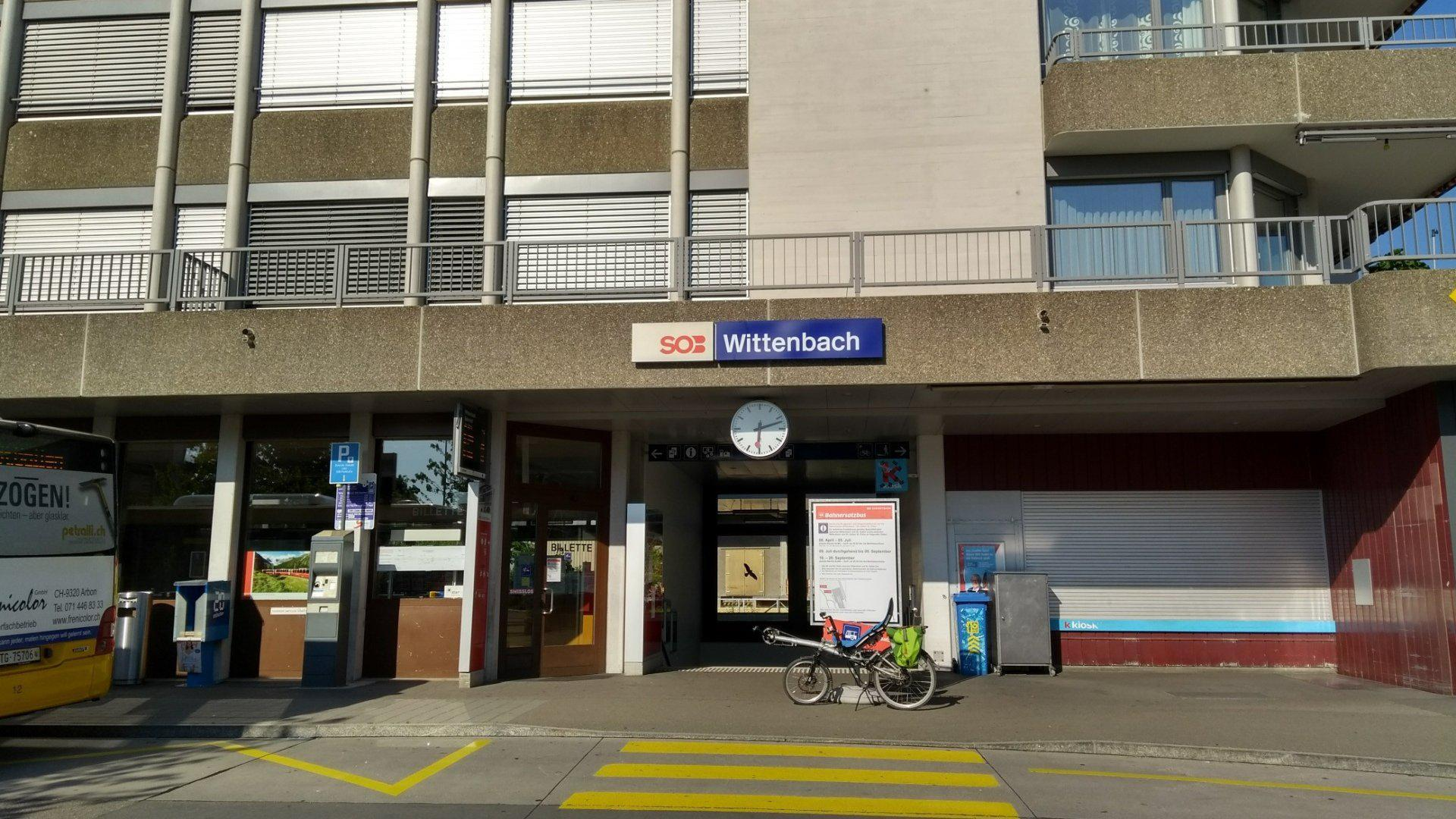
- The station entrance in 2018

General information
- Location: Wittenbach; Switzerland
- Coordinates: 47°27′45″N 9°23′39″E
- Elevation: 603 m (1,978 ft)
- Owner: Südostbahn
- Line: Bodensee–Toggenburg line
- Train operators: Thurbo
- Connections
- Trolleybus: VBSG trolleybus routes 3 4
- Bus: Postauto bus routes 154 200 205

Other information
- Fare zone: 211 (Tarifverbund Ostwind)

Services
Preceding station	St. Gallen S-Bahn	Following station
Roggwil-Berg towards Schaffhausen	S1	St. Gallen St. Fiden towards Wil
Terminus	S82	St. Gallen St. Fiden towards St. Gallen
Roggwil-Berg towards Romanshorn	SN72 Limited service	St. Gallen St. Fiden towards Lichtensteig
Location
- Location within Switzerland Location within Canton of St. Gallen

Wittenbach railway station (German: Bahnhof Wittenbach) is a railway station in Wittenbach, in the Swiss canton of St. Gallen. It is an intermediate stop on the Bodensee–Toggenburg line and is served by local trains only.

== Services ==
Wittenbach is served by the S1 and S82 of the St. Gallen S-Bahn:

- S1: half-hourly service between Schaffhausen and Wil via St. Gallen.
- S82: rush-hour service to St. Gallen.

During weekends, the station is served by a nighttime S-Bahn service (SN72), offered by Ostwind fare network, and operated by Thurbo for St. Gallen S-Bahn.

- St. Gallen S-Bahn SN72: hourly service to Lichtensteig and to Romanshorn, via St. Gallen.

== See also ==
- Bodensee S-Bahn
- Rail transport in Switzerland
