= St. Gallen St. Fiden railway station =

Railway station in the city of St. Gallen, Switzerland

St. Gallen St. Fiden
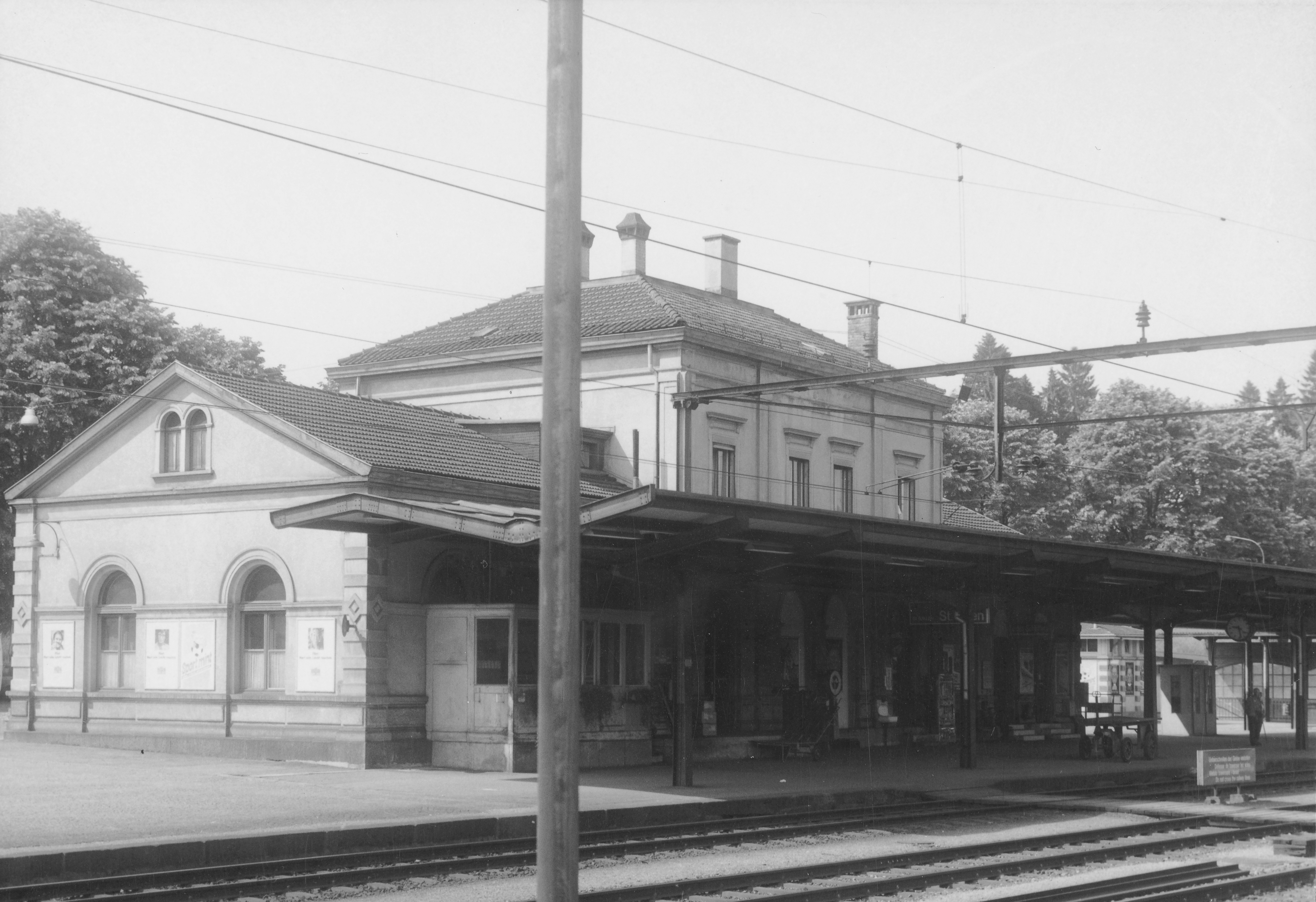
- The St. Gallen St. Fiden station building in 1976

General information
- Location: St. Gallen; Switzerland
- Coordinates: 47°26′06″N 9°23′35″E
- Elevation: 645 m (2,116 ft)
- Lines: Bodensee–Toggenburg line; Rorschach–St. Gallen line
- Train operators: Thurbo; Südostbahn
- Connections
- Bus: VBSG bus routes 9 11

Other information
- Fare zone: 210 (Tarifverbund Ostwind)

Services
| Preceding station | St. Gallen S-Bahn | Following station |
|---|---|---|
| St. Gallen towards Wil | S1 | Wittenbach towards Schaffhausen |
| St. Gallen towards Nesslau-Neu St. Johann | S2 | Mörschwil towards Altstätten SG |
| St. Gallen towards Rapperswil | S4 | Mörschwil towards Sargans |
| St. Gallen towards Weinfelden | S5 | Goldach towards St. Margrethen |
| St. Gallen Terminus | S82 | Wittenbach Terminus |
| St. Gallen towards Winterthur | SN22 Limited service | Mörschwil towards Heerbrugg |
| St. Gallen towards Lichtensteig | SN72 Limited service | Wittenbach towards Romanshorn |
Location
- Location within Switzerland Location within Canton of St. Gallen

St. Gallen St. Fiden railway station (German: Bahnhof St. Gallen St. Fiden) is a railway station in St. Gallen, in the Swiss canton of St. Gallen. It is an intermediate station on the Bodensee–Toggenburg and Rorschach–St. Gallen lines.

== Services ==
=== S-Bahn ===
As of the December 2023 timetable change, the following services stop at St. Gallen St. Fiden:

- St. Gallen S-Bahn:
  - S1: half-hourly service between Wil and Schaffhausen.
  - S2 / S4: half-hourly service between Wattwil and Altstätten SG via St. Gallen and hourly service to Rapperswil, Sargans, and Nesslau-Neu St. Johann.
  - S5: hourly service between Weinfelden and St. Margrethen.
  - S82: rush-hour service between St. Gallen and Wittenbach.

During weekends, the station is served by two nighttime S-Bahn services (SN22, SN72), offered by Ostwind fare network, and operated by Thurbo for St. Gallen S-Bahn.

- St. Gallen S-Bahn:
  - SN22: hourly service to Winterthur and to Heerbrugg, via St. Gallen.
  - SN72: hourly service to Lichtensteig and to Romanshorn, via St. Gallen.

=== Bus ===
Two nearby bus stops, St. Fiden, Bhf. Ost and St. Fiden, Bhf. Süd, are served by buses of Verkehrsbetriebe St. Gallen (VBSG).

== See also ==
- Bodensee S-Bahn
- Rail transport in Switzerland
