= Schweizersholz =

Village in Thurgau, Switzerland

- Former municipality
- Location of Schweizersholz
- Location within Switzerland Location within Canton of Thurgau
- Coordinates: 47.5029°N 9.2022°E
- Country: Switzerland
- Canton: Thurgau
- District: Bischofszell
- Municipality: Bischofszell

Population (1990)
  - Total: 290
- Time zone: UTC+01:00 (CET)
  - Summer (DST): UTC+02:00 (CEST)
- ISO 3166 code: CH-TG
- Website

Schweizersholz is a former Ortsgemeinde (local commune) in the canton of Thurgau, Switzerland, which has been part of the municipality of Bischofszell since 1996. From 1803 to 1995 Schweizersholz, which comprised more than twenty hamlets, among them Kenzenau (first mentioned in 1260 as Chinzinnowe), was an Ortsgemeinde of the Munizipalgemeinde (municipal commune) of Neukirch an der Thur. In 1996 some of its hamlets were separated from Schweizersholz and went to Kradolf-Schönenberg.

== History ==
Schweizersholz is first mentioned in 1505 as Schwytzers Holtz. Until 1798 the low jurisdiction belonged to the bishop of Constance, who placed Schweizersholz, as part of the office (Amt) of Schönenberg, under his chief bailiff (Obervogt) in Bischofszell. Some farms were subject to the town court of Bischofszell and to the collegiate foundation of St. Pelagius there. In church matters Schweizersholz shared the fate of the Reformed parishes of Bischofszell-Hauptwil, Neukirch and Sulgen and of the Catholic parishes of Bischofszell, Heiligkreuz and Sulgen.

Grain growing predominated until the 19th century; fruit and flax were also grown, and cotton and linen weaving were practiced, followed by embroidery around 1900. Kundert AG, founded in 1906 as a trading company for textile machinery accessories, began producing gearwheels in the 1960s; it moved away in 1996. Until 1970 the primary sector always provided more than half of the jobs in Schweizersholz.

The population was 511 in 1850, 454 in 1900, 433 in 1950 and 290 in 1990.

== Bibliography ==
- Die Kunstdenkmäler des Kantons Thurgau, vol. 3, 1962, pp. 485–490
- Thurgauer Zeitung, 6 April 1996
- Hinweisinventar alter Bauten und Ortsbilder im Kanton Thurgau: Schweizersholz, manuscript, 1998 (State Archives of Thurgau)
