= Goldach railway station =

Railway station in Switzerland

Goldach
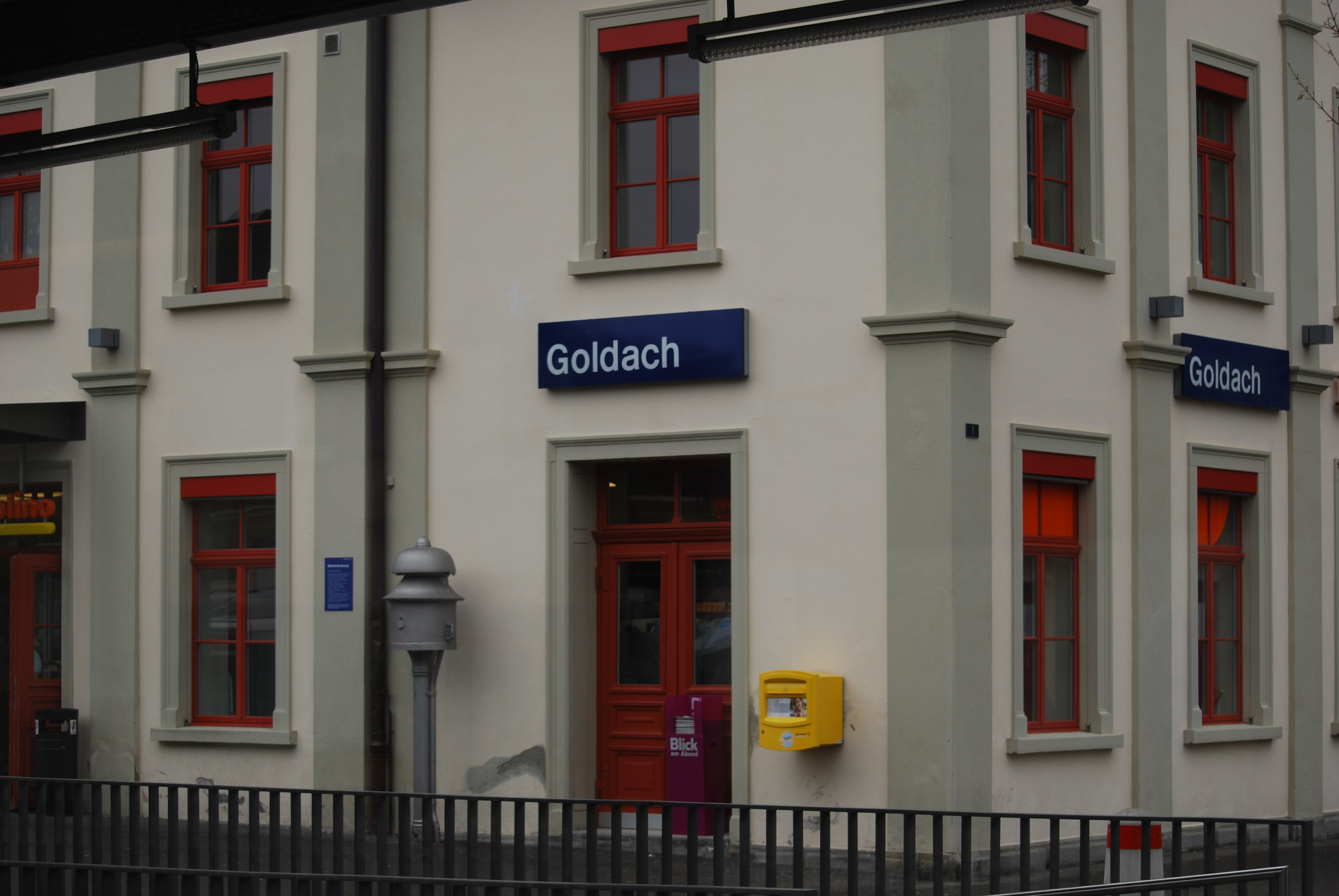
- The Goldach station building in 2013

General information
- Location: Goldach; Switzerland
- Coordinates: 47°28′N 9°28′E
- Line: Rorschach–St. Gallen line
- Train operators: THURBO; Südostbahn

Services
Preceding station	St. Gallen S-Bahn	Following station
Mörschwil towards Nesslau-Neu St. Johann	S2	Rorschach Stadt towards Altstätten SG
Mörschwil towards Rapperswil	S4	Rorschach Stadt towards Sargans
St. Gallen St. Fiden towards Weinfelden	S5	Rorschach Stadt towards St. Margrethen
Location
- Location within Switzerland Location within Canton of St. Gallen

Goldach railway station (German: Bahnhof Goldach) is a railway station in Goldach, in the Swiss canton of St. Gallen. It is an intermediate stop on the Rorschach–St. Gallen line.

== Services ==
As of the December 2023 timetable change, the following services stop at Goldach:

- St. Gallen S-Bahn:
  - S2 / S4: half-hourly service between Wattwil and Altstätten SG via St. Gallen and hourly service to Rapperswil, Sargans, and Nesslau-Neu St. Johann.
  - S5: hourly service between Weinfelden and St. Margrethen.
