= Mörschwil railway station =

Railway station in Switzerland

Mörschwil
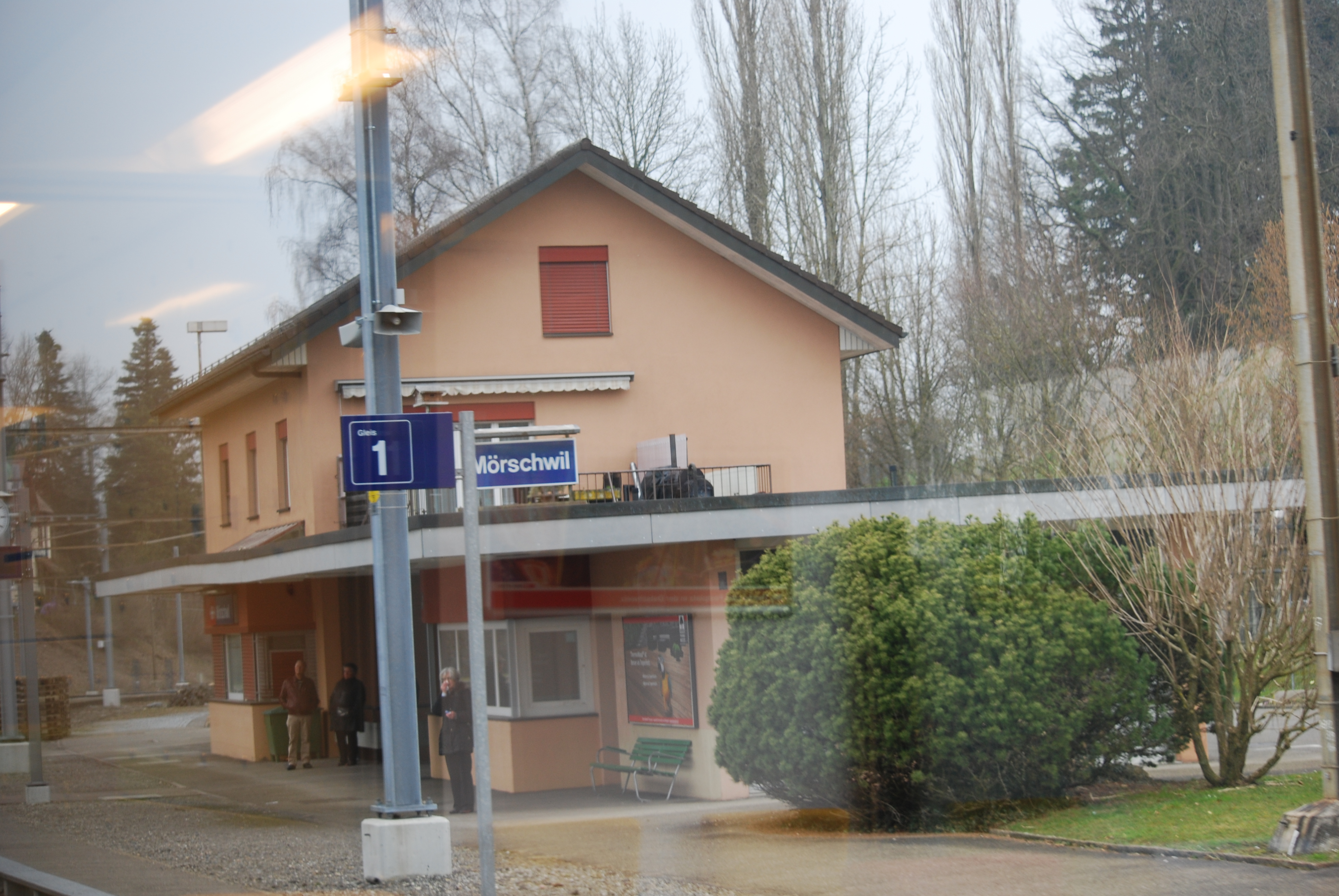
- The Mörschwil station building in 2013

General information
- Location: Mörschwil; Switzerland
- Coordinates: 47°28′N 9°25′E
- Elevation: 542 m (1,778 ft)
- Line: Rorschach–St. Gallen line
- Train operators: Thurbo; Südostbahn

Other information
- Fare zone: 211 (Tarifverbund Ostwind)

Services
Preceding station	St. Gallen S-Bahn	Following station
St. Gallen St. Fiden towards Nesslau-Neu St. Johann	S2	Goldach towards Altstätten SG
St. Gallen St. Fiden towards Rapperswil	S4	Goldach towards Sargans
St. Gallen St. Fiden towards Winterthur	SN22 Limited service	Rorschach Stadt towards Heerbrugg
Location
- Location within Switzerland Location within Canton of St. Gallen

Mörschwil railway station (German: Bahnhof Mörschwil) is a railway station in Mörschwil, in the Swiss canton of St. Gallen. It is an intermediate stop on the Rorschach–St. Gallen line.

== Services ==
As of the December 2023 timetable change, the following services stop at Mörschwil:

- St. Gallen S-Bahn S2 / S4: half-hourly service between Wattwil and Altstätten SG via St. Gallen and hourly service to Rapperswil, Sargans, and Nesslau-Neu St. Johann.

During weekends, the station is served by a nighttime S-Bahn service (SN22), offered by Ostwind fare network, and operated by Thurbo for St. Gallen S-Bahn.

- St. Gallen S-Bahn SN22: hourly service to Winterthur and to Heerbrugg, via St. Gallen.

== See also ==
- Bodensee S-Bahn
- Rail transport in Switzerland
