= Bischofszell Stadt railway station =

Railway station in Switzerland

Bischofszell Stadt
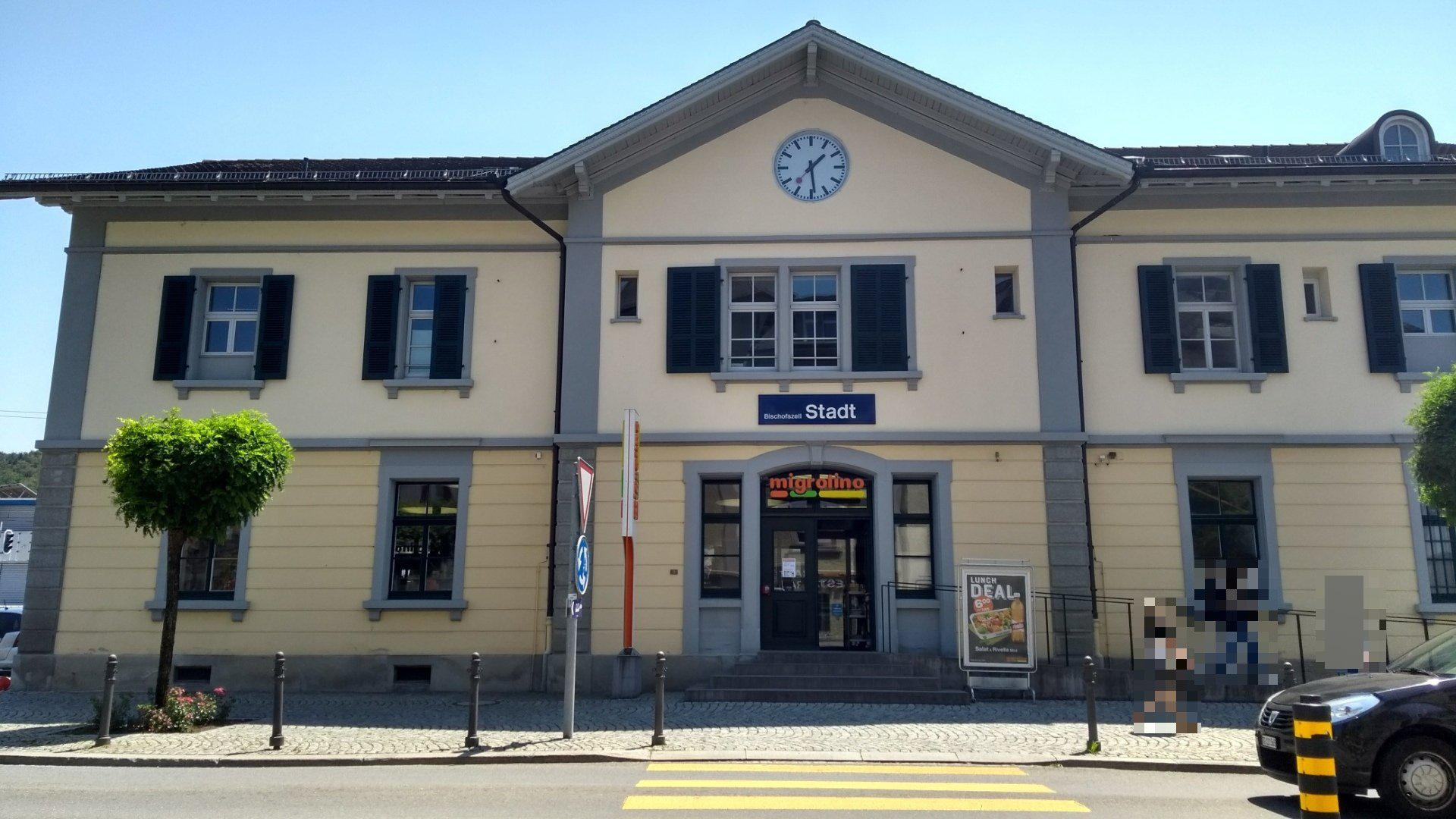
- The station building in 2018

General information
- Location: Bischofszell; Switzerland
- Coordinates: 47°29′N 9°14′E
- Owner: Swiss Federal Railways
- Line: Sulgen–Gossau line
- Distance: 10.1 km (6.3 mi) from Sulgen
- Train operators: THURBO
- Connections: Regiobus

Other information
- Fare zone: 229 (Tarifverbund Ostwind)

Services
Preceding station	St. Gallen S-Bahn	Following station
Sitterdorf towards Weinfelden	S5	Hauptwil towards St. Margrethen
Location
- Location within Switzerland Location within Canton of Thurgau

Bischofszell Stadt railway station (German: Bahnhof Bischofszell Stadt) is a railway station in Bischofszell, in the Swiss canton of Thurgau. It is an intermediate stop on the Sulgen–Gossau line.

== Services ==
As of the December 2023 timetable change, the following services stop at Bischofszell Stadt:

- St. Gallen S-Bahn S5: half-hourly service to Weinfelden; hourly (weekends) or half-hourly (weekdays) service to St. Gallen; hourly service to St. Margrethen.
