= Sulgen railway station =

Railway station in Switzerland

Sulgen
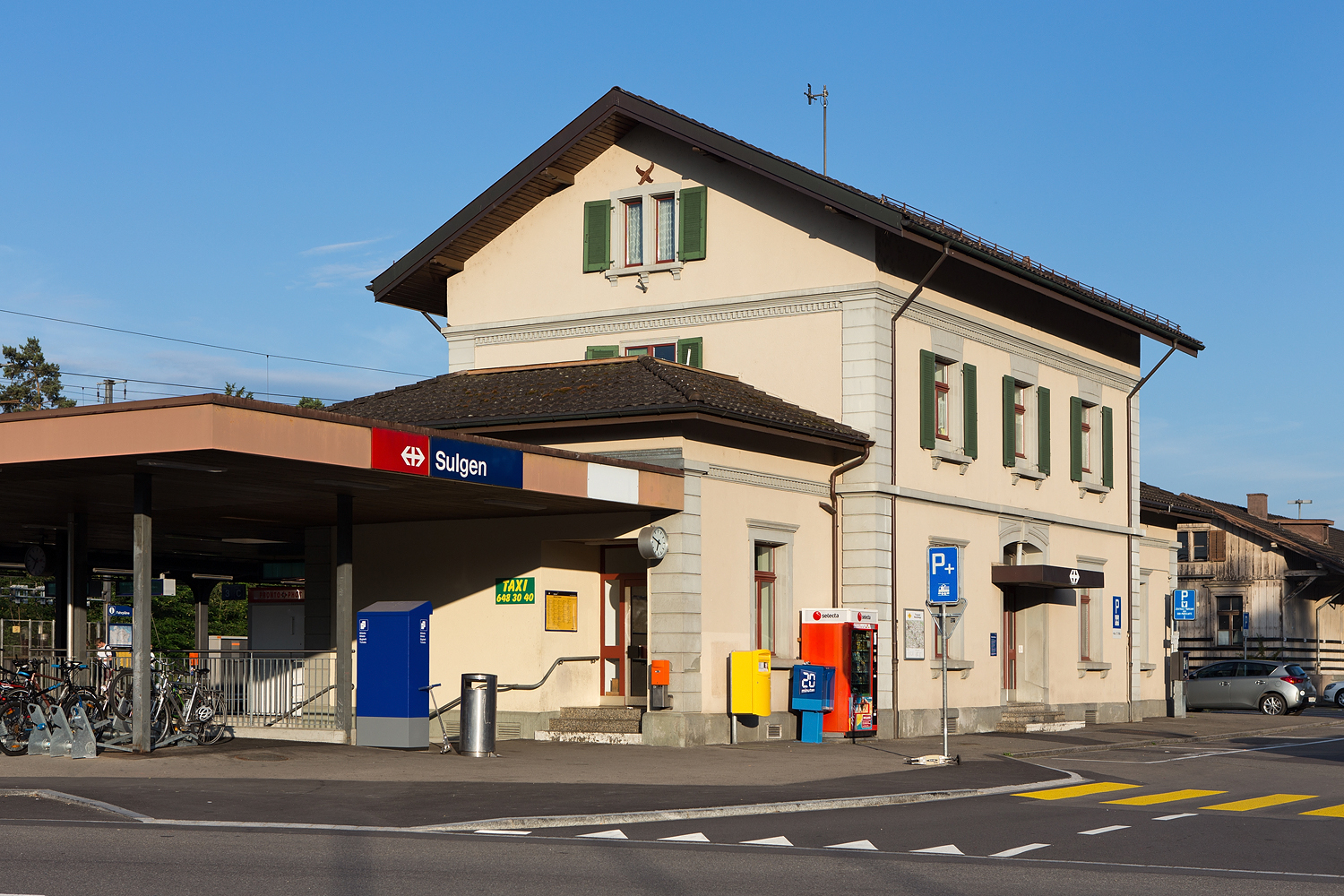
- The station building in 2015

General information
- Location: Sulgen; Switzerland
- Coordinates: 47°32′20″N 9°11′02″E
- Elevation: 449 m (1,473 ft)
- Owner: Swiss Federal Railways
- Lines: Winterthur–Romanshorn line; Sulgen–Gossau line
- Distance: 66.1 km (41.1 mi) from Zürich HB
- Platforms: 2
- Tracks: 3
- Train operators: Thurbo

Other information
- Fare zone: 925 (Tarifverbund Ostwind)

Services
Preceding station	St. Gallen S-Bahn	Following station
Bürglen towards Weinfelden	S5	Kradolf towards St. Margrethen
Bürglen towards Wil	S10	Erlen towards Romanshorn
Bürglen towards Winterthur	SN30 Limited service	Erlen towards Romanshorn
Preceding station	Zurich S-Bahn	Following station
Weinfelden towards Zürich HB	S23	Amriswil towards Romanshorn
Location
- Location within Switzerland Location within Canton of Thurgau

Sulgen railway station (German: Bahnhof Sulgen) is a railway station in Sulgen, in the Swiss canton of Thurgau. It is an intermediate stop on the Winterthur–Romanshorn line and the northern terminus of the Sulgen–Gossau line.

== Layout ==
Sulgen has two platforms serving three tracks, numbered 1–3. The platform nearest the station building (Swiss Standard German: Hausperron) is 120 metres (390 ft) long. Across from it is a 324-metre (1,063 ft) island platform with two tracks.

== Services ==
As of the December 2023 timetable change, the following services stop at Sulgen:

- St. Gallen S-Bahn:
  - S5: half-hourly service between Weinfelden and Bischofszell Stadt (weekends) or St. Gallen (weekdays); hourly service to St. Margrethen.
  - S10: half-hourly service between Wil and Romanshorn, via Weinfelden.
- Zurich S-Bahn:
  - S23: peak-hour service between Zürich HB and Romanshorn via Zürich Stadelhofen.

During weekends, the station is served by a nighttime S-Bahn service (SN30), offered by Ostwind fare network, and operated by Thurbo for St. Gallen S-Bahn.

- St. Gallen S-Bahn SN30: hourly service to Winterthur and to Romanshorn, via Frauenfeld.

== See also ==
- Bodensee S-Bahn
- Rail transport in Switzerland
