= Sulgen–Gossau railway =

Swiss railway line

Sulgen–Gossau
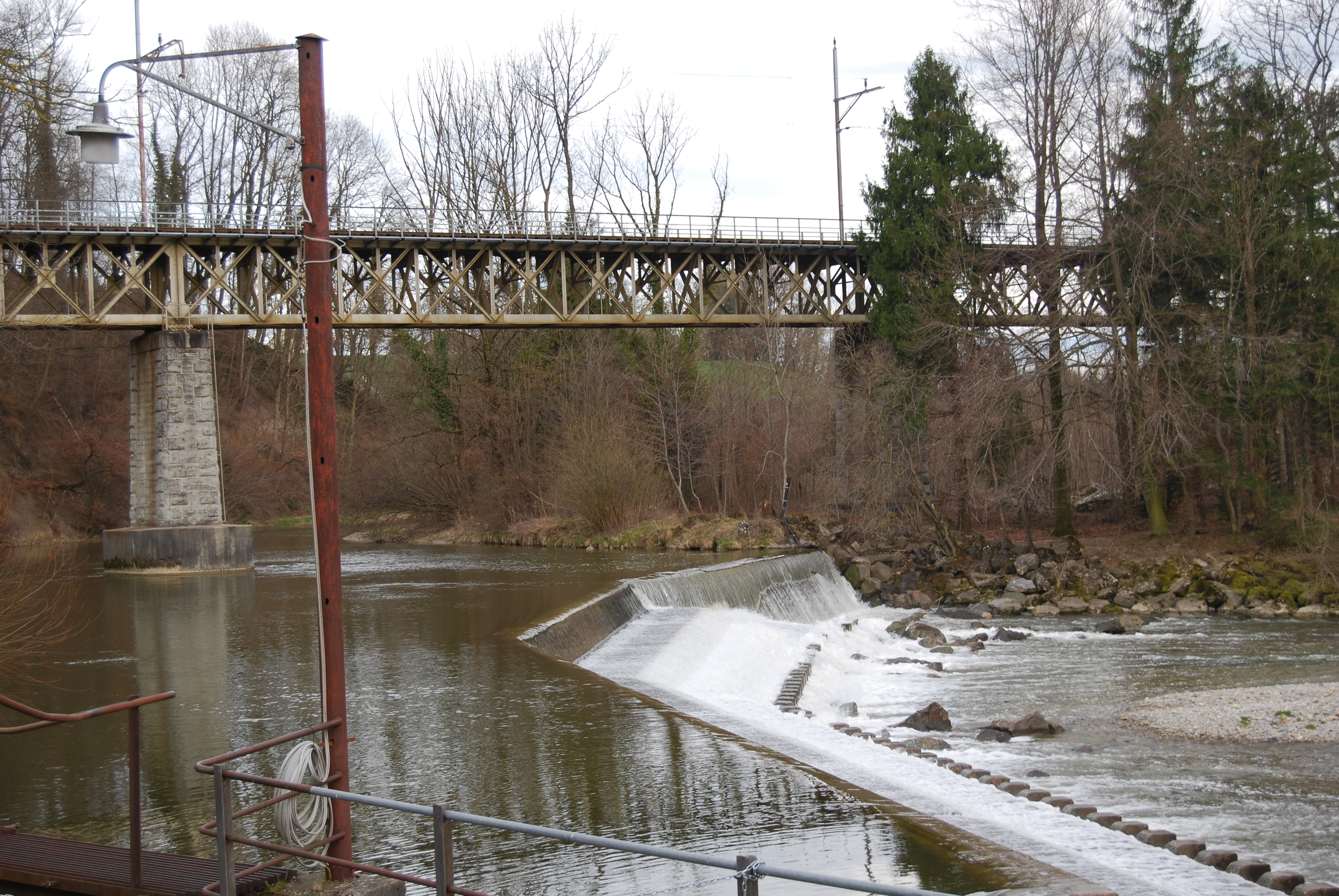

Overview
- Owner: Swiss Federal Railways
- Line number: 852
- Termini: Sulgen; Gossau SG

Technical
- Line length: 22.94 km (14.25 mi)
- Number of tracks: 1
- Track gauge: 1,435 mm (4 ft 8 1/2 in) standard gauge
- Electrification: 15 kV/16.7 Hz AC overhead catenary
- Maximum incline: 1.7%

The Sulgen–Gossau railway (SG) is a standard gauge railway in the Swiss cantons of St. Gallen and Thurgau, which was built by the Bischofszellerbahn (Bischofszell Railway) and the railway is also known by that name. Its 23 km (14 mi), standard gauge line has belonged to the Swiss Federal Railways (SBB) since 1902.

== History ==
After an evaluation of routes, the Bischofszell Railway decided on a route from Gossau via Bischofszell to Sulgen in Thurgau. The other possible route was Uzwil–Bischofszell–Amriswil. Since in the second option would not have benefitted the town of St. Gallen and would have lost significant potential traffic, the Bischofszell Railway decided on the Gossau–Sulgen route. It was the first line between St. Gallen and the Thur valley.

The railway line was leased in 1875 by the Swiss Northeastern Railway (Schweizerische Nordostbahn; NOB) and passed into its ownership on 31 July 1885. The railway took over operations on the Sulgen–Bischofszell section on 1 February 1876. The Sulgen–Gossau line was opened on 5 July 1876. It was electrified on 15 May 1936.

== Operations ==
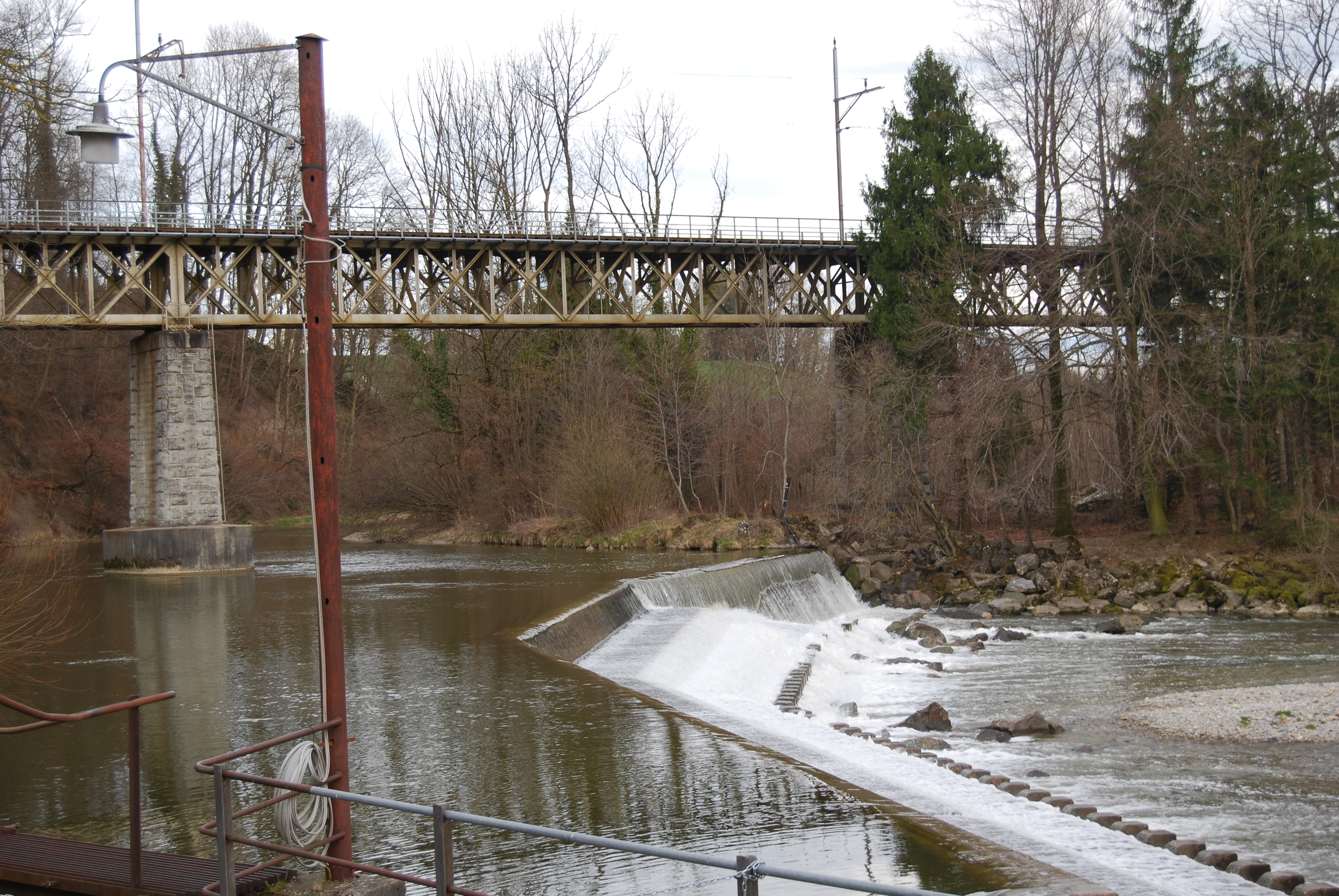
Railway bridge at Sitterdorf, canton of Thurgovia, Switzerland

The Sulgen–Gossau railway is now owned by SBB and operated by Thurbo. Line S5 (St. Gallen–Weinfelden) of the St. Gallen S-Bahn runs on it.

Due to two bridges between Bischofzell-Nord and Hauptwil that allow only small loads, only light locomotives are allowed on this part of the line—it the only SBB line subject to this restriction. This fact often causes problems for operations, because light locomotives like the Re 4/4^{I} (their last domain) had to be used for freight traffic, since the Ae 6/6 were too heavy. Today, Stadler GTW low-floor articulated railcars operate on the line.

The problem lies with the bridges between Bischofszell Nord and Hauptwil, which have a maximum permissible load per metre of 6.4 t/m, because operations are now permitted without restraint with an axle weight of 22.5 t. In the past this limit was much lower. Only rolling stock with a load of up to 3.6 t and 16 t axle weight were allowed to be used with permission, although axle weights of 20 tonnes for two-axle wagons were allowed if the speed on the bridges was reduced to 30 km/h (19 mph). If run in a certain order, wagons could be transported up to a load per metre of 5.0 t/m (2 wagons maximum of 3 t/m, 1 wagon up to 5 t/m, 2 wagons maximum of 3 t/m, or 2 wagons maximum of 3 t/m, 1–2 wagons up to 4 t/m 2, wagons maximum of 3 t/m).

Operations with Re 4/4^{II} locomotives have been permitted only since the increase. For a long time the line had been closed for this type of rolling stock. For this reason, Re 4/4^{I} locomotives were initially used for hauling Thurbo's Frauenfeld–Chur parcel post trains. Since their departure, SOB Re 456 (formerly BT) locomotives are used.

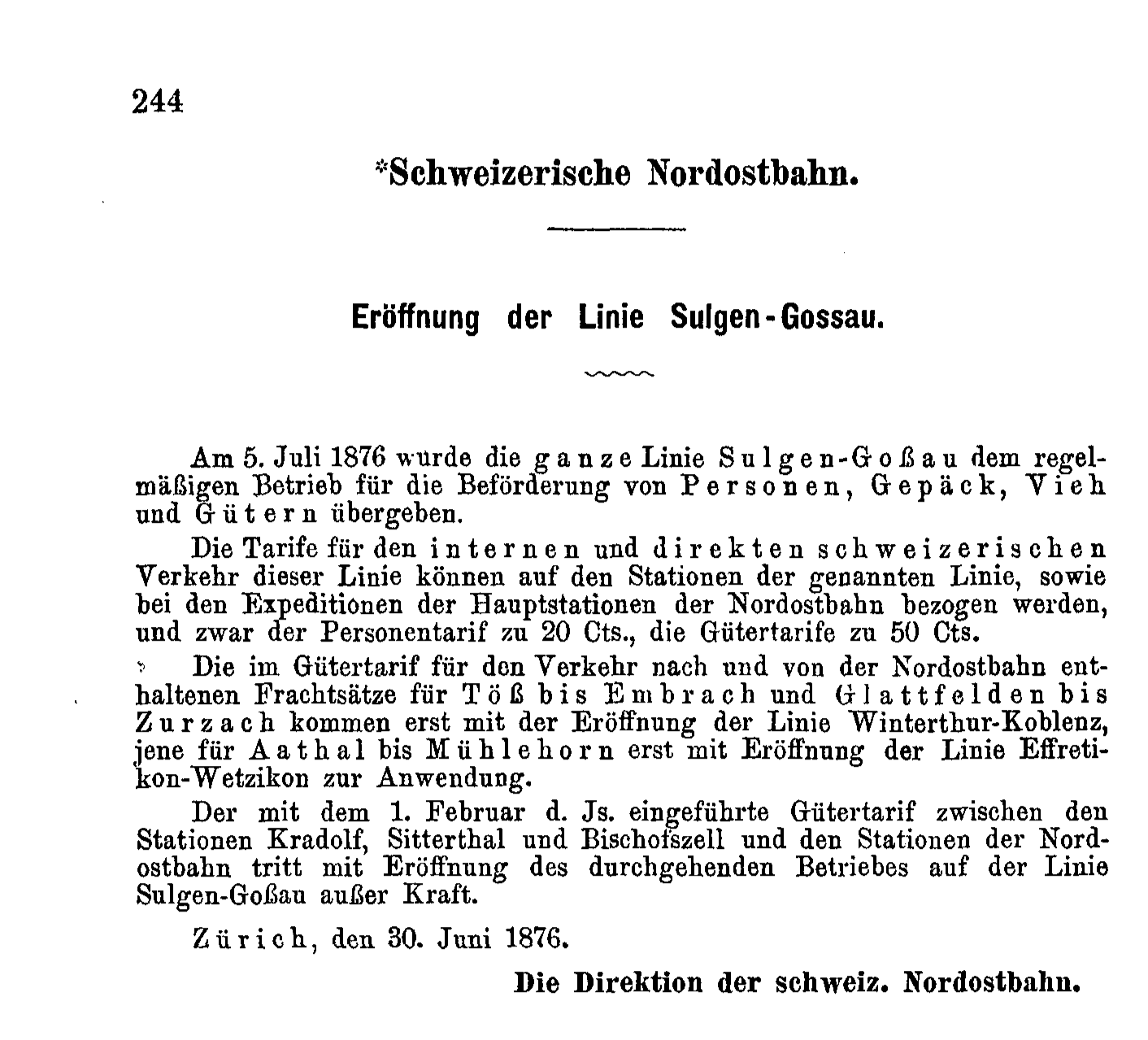
Official publication, notifying the opening of the Sulgen-Gossau line
