= Ivo Sasek =

Swiss-German lay preacher and author

Ivo Sasek (born 10 July 1956) is a Swiss-German lay preacher, author of religious writings and leader of the religious sect Organic Christ Generation (OCG), which he founded in 1999. This organization, classified as a cult, has between two and three thousand German-speaking members. In 2008, Sasek founded the Anti-Censorship Coalition (German: Anti-Zensur-Koalition; AZK), a forum for right-wing esotericism, conspiracy theories, antisemitism, xenophobia and historical revisionism, including Holocaust denial. From Sasek's Panorama Center in Walzenhausen, Switzerland, these organizations and their numerous media outlets are run, including the Neue Rechte ('new right') online channel Klagemauer.tv. Sasek rejects an open, democratic and pluralistic society.

== Personal background ==
Sasek was born in Zürich and is a trained car mechanic. According to his own account, he experienced a visionary conversion to Christianity in 1977. In 1978, he left his job, joined the Newlife movement and worked, among other things, as a preacher at Gospelradio Zürich. He attended a Bible school, though did not graduate. The school reportedly rejected his visionary experiences as Pentecostal spiritual gifts. Beginning in 1980, Sasek became known for his work with drug addicts and gained his first followers. In 1984 he founded the Obadja Drug Rehabilitation Center in Walzenhausen. This was followed by a School of Life and a Discipleship School. He began a church teaching ministry, traveling to churches in German-speaking countries and spreading his messages through writings and audio tapes. Around 1999, he introduced an assessment ministry to evaluate a person's spiritual condition, which gave rise to the Organic Christ Generation (Organische Christus Generation; OCG).

Sasek has been married since 1983. As of 2004, Anni and Ivo Sasek have eleven children, who, beginning in 2010 joined their parents in spreading the teachings of the OCG. During the summer months, they regularly went on tours featuring original musicals, children's songs, films, and personal testimonies. A network of home groups made up of OCG followers organized their performances, during which they portrayed themselves as successors to their father's teachings, an ideal Christian family, and role models for the OCG's "organic" family and church life. At times, Sasek also undertook mission trips to France, Belgium, Ukraine and Romania. Three sons —including Simon, who was to become his successor—as well as a daughter-in-law, have since left the group.

== Organic Christ Generation (OGC) ==
=== End-time claim to absoluteness ===
Sasek considers himself "the perfecter of the Reformation" and a "true theologian" who speaks "God's current word in this age." In his publications, he claims to have "seen God" and that God "Himself delivered" him at birth. He sees himself as an apostle to the nations and a prophet of judgment who can evaluate the faith of other Christians and recognize and distinguish truth from falsehood. The standard for this is his claimed personal visionary experiences of life and God. In doing so, he equates himself and his message with God: "I say: whoever speaks against this message; I say: whoever speaks against me and this message, whoever does not submit to the word that I, Ivo Sasek, speak here in Walzenhausen, is not a true servant of God." "If anyone speaks against me, then he speaks against God, I will tell it like it is."

Sasek understands the Bible as an unfinished Word of God, which is continually supplemented by current revelations of the Spirit. He believes in the imminent end of the world, applies texts of biblical apocalyptic texts directly to contemporary historical events and links them to current conspiracy theories. Since 2008, Sasek has also integrated the idea of reincarnation into his system. Since it has little biblical evidence, he claims that the Second Council of Constantinople, held in 553, deliberately removed this concept from the Bible.

Sasek conveys his message in the style of early Christian epistles to OCG groups, as well as to local church congregations. In these messages, he preaches against "self-sufficient prosperity Christianity" and "assurance of salvation", labels other church leaders as false prophets, invites them to his events and threatens them with God's judgment if they refuse. For Sasek, Christians can survive God's impending Last Judgment only if they integrate themselves into a divine system or order with absolute obedience in marriage, family and child-rearing. In March 2017, he described this order as an "organism" in which everyone is "existentially intertwined" like a human body, and "united in destiny" with one another "according to organic laws and principles." This organic community, he states, takes precedence over all individuality and is currently being "regenerated (brought forth) anew from Christ." To integrate into it, each individual must radically renounce sin, surrender their own will, and separate themselves from sinners. However, he does not demand that people leave conventional congregations; rather, he calls for them to profess their allegiance to the OCG within those congregations and form small, interdenominational house groups.

=== Assessment ===
Through regular "assessment sessions", Sasek and the "sinless" helpers he has trained claim to determine the degree of integration into the OCG. In three-day courses, participants are expected to work through questions provided by Sasek in order to encourage self-reflection, self-transformation, and community-building. Sasek describes this "assessment" as "helping people help themselves", which he says has grown out of "decades of therapy and family counseling" and has already helped "thousands of people and hundreds of families live harmoniously together."

Participants have reported, however, that Sasek points out their complete unsuitability for the Body of Christ, has been confronting them since 2008 with alleged sins from past lives, and does not allow them to form their own conception of what it means to be a Christian: only those who follow his radical rules of obedience, submission and self-denial pass the "assessment" and are counted among the "new, redeemed and sinless" generation. This compulsion to submit causes severe identity crises and mental breakdowns.

=== Raising children ===
For Sasek, children are the "manifestation of an entire generation of redeemers." If they "grow up with unclouded eye contact and an undivided relationship with God Almighty," they would "become, without distraction, an ever-growing field of God's power", through which "God's works will take place as the world has never seen before." Birth control and abortion, he states, are a wave of murder orchestrated by the enemy to stop this generation of saviors. To prepare children for their divinely predestined mission, parents and educators must combat all carnal passions that oppose to the Spirit of God from the beginning. In order for children to learn complete submission to what Sasek claims is God's will, he recommends physical violence as a supposedly necessary, biblically based means of education. Parents cannot presuppose that children have good intentions; rather, they must break their willfulness. If they drive out evil thoroughly enough, goodness will follow naturally, like a law of nature, regardless of Christian faith. Children's ingratitude, dissatisfaction or listlessness should be punished by parents with renunciation or confinement to teach the child humility. If they resist, they are to be struck on the buttocks with a bamboo rod to the point of "bloody welts." Just as Sasek cites the example of his mother, who he says rightly beat him as a child, three of his minor children published the book Mama, Please Discipline Me! in 2000 through Sasek's Elaion Publishing. In it, Sasek's eldest son, Simon, described punishment with a bamboo rod and his fear of it as a child. Sasek's parenting advice regarding corporal punishment led to two criminal complaints of child abuse; the investigations were dropped in both cases.

Sasek's teachings give rise to a strong distrust of governmental institutions and a confrontational stance toward authorities. For example, the OCG rejects mandatory vaccinations, sex education, and evidence-based educational approaches, which often leads its adherents into conflict with schools, child welfare agencies, and family courts. OCG groups network and propagandize through digital media, courses, and training camps. Despite its relatively small membership of around 2,000, the OCG is said to reach tens of thousands of people at times.

A 21-year-old former member reported in August 2018 that she had been repeatedly punished and beaten for even the smallest mistakes well into her teenage years. Contact with the outside world had been minimized, and attempts had been made to break her will. Brainwashing, control, indoctrination and intimidation defined life within the group. She managed to leave the group during a hospital stay, where she had experienced personal care for the first time. Sasek denied the account and asserted that the OCG existed "in a bond of the heart, in a deep awareness of the togetherness of all the people in this world."

By November 2018, more people had left the OCG, including Sasek's eldest son, Simon. Almost all of them told Austrian broadcaster ORF about serious experiences of violence, but out of fear of reprisals, did not want to go on camera or would only do so anonymously. Since 2018, however, Simon has been running a YouTube channel where he speaks openly about his departure. Sasek attributed his son's departure to "persecution by the mass media" and declined to be interviewed.

=== Data collection ===
According to research by Bayerischer Rundfunk, in January 2020 the OCG asked its supporters to collect data on politicians and journalists and find out "who is friend or foe". By the end of April 2020, the OCG had collected and stored private data on approximately 8,200 people from German-speaking countries, mostly publicly available information such as home addresses, cell phone numbers, religious affiliation, nationality and sexual orientation. Those affected include representatives of all German political parties, state parliaments and the Bundestag (parliament), as well as civil servants, journalists and activists—including critics of the sect and several chairmen of Jewish institutions. For some, their "Jewish heritage" is noted. Sensitive information was also collected on some government politicians. In response to inquiries, Sasek explained that the data collection served to "educate" OCG members about "the nature and attitude of our elected representatives" and was intended only for "internal use". He did not explain the remarks about Jews.

Andreas Zick, a researcher on extremism, referred to the categories listed as a "racist list" of a scope otherwise known only from "enemy lists" compiled by far-right extremists or jihadists. Given the history of murders of people who had previously been on such lists, he stated there is a high risk to those affected in this case as well. The Bavarian State Parliament instructed the state government to investigate the sect's activities more closely. The General Public Prosecutor's Office in Munich is conducting a preliminary investigation into the OCG on suspicion of incitement to hatred.

== Anti-Censorship Coalition (AZK) ==
=== Goals ===
In 2008, Sasek founded the Anti-Censorship Coalition (Anti-Zensur-Koalition; AZK). It calls itself "Europe's largest platform for uncensored information" so that people can hear "pro and con" arguments, including from "highly qualified expert opinions from around the world." Sasek organizes and directs annual anti-censorship conferences, where he invites proponents of all manner of conspiracy theories to speak. His stated goal is to unsettle listeners until they turn away from democracy: "I say it won't work without a dictatorship, because: This creation is not set up for democracy. It does not function according to democratic principles." According to theologian and philosopher Heinzpeter Hempelmann of the Evangelical Church in Germany, the AZK does not represent a shared cause, but rather serves as a support group for people who feel oppressed by the so-called mainstream and are trying to promote their own interpretation of freedom of speech. The AZK specifically writes to politicians in an effort to win them over to its ideas. At the same time, according to research by Austrian national broadcaster ORF, Sasek and the AZK obstruct, insult and threaten critical journalists.

=== Speakers and topics ===
At the first AZK conference in the spring of 2008, Werner Altnickel claimed chemtrails were being sprayed to poison people's minds (mind control) and to trigger droughts, famines, and wars. At the second AZK conference on 27 September 2008, Sasek had Ryke Geerd Hamer's "Germanic New Medicine" presented in detail.

At the 2009 AZK conference, historical revisionist Gerd Schultze-Rhonhof and Jürg Stettler, press spokesman for the German Church of Scientology and president of its Swiss branch, spoke. Stettler primarily attacked the media. At the 2010 AZK conference, Bernhard Schaub, a Swiss Holocaust denier with a criminal record, expressed far-right views. Sasek congratulated him on his speech. At the 2011 AZK conference, far-right filmmaker Michael Friedrich Vogt (known for the documentary Geheimakte Heß) claimed that the Nazi Rudolf Hess had undertaken his 1941 flight to England at the initiative of Adolf Hitler in order to conduct peace talks. At the 2012 AZK conference at the town hall in Chur, Switzerland, Sasek invited the previously convicted far-right Holocaust denier Sylvia Stolz as the keynote speaker. In his welcoming remarks, he explained that, in opposition to the media's "manipulation of public opinion" the AZK sought to "awaken" the people and turn them into bearers of light and a fighting force for the truth. He asked the audience to chant the motto "I am strong through the truth" in unison.

In her lecture, Stolz claimed, contrary to the facts, that the Holocaust had never been proven in court, that all "testimonies, documents or other evidence" were missing for "the crime scenes, methods of killing, number of dead, periods of the crime, perpetrators, corpses or traces of murder" and for the National Socialist "intention to destroy Jewry in whole or in part". The German people no longer let themselves be oppressed. She challenged the audience to get to know Nazis and received enthusiastic applause. Sasek thanked her emotionally, calling her a woman with the "courage of a lion," who had helped "seek and find the truth." He published her lecture on the Internet.

The Bernese lawyer Daniel Kettiger then denounced Stolz and Sasek for violations of the racism criminal code: Sasek had invited Stolz in the knowledge of her crimes and had not withdrawn the floor from her "as a responsible moderator" when she engaged in obvious Holocaust denial over a longer period of time. Sasek stressed that he did not necessarily adopt the content of guest speeches at AZK meetings as his own. All guest lectures would be legally reviewed beforehand. In Stolz's case, he said, nothing had been found "that had anything to do with Holocaust denial or anti-Semitism." That is why her lecture was judged to be unobjectionable and published. He received a Straffenzbefehl (penalty court notice) in 2017 for providing a stage for Holocaust deniers. After appealing against it, he was acquitted by final judgment in 2018. Sylvia Stolz, on the other hand, was sentenced in 2018 to 18 months in prison without probation for Volksverhetzung after an appeal trial.

AZK 2013 took place on November 23, again at the Stadthalle Chur. Its administration, Expo-Chur AG, had refrained from banning him because Sasek had not been criminally convicted until then.

Until then, the AZKs were mainly advertised and announced in right-wing to right-wing extremist circles advertised and announced. Sasek kept the location of the 2014 AZK secret and only issued tickets for it through personal mediation. He gave an introductory lecture on "How to prevent a world war?" In the unabridged version, which was available to the Tages-Anzeiger, he claimed: the political and economic establishment as well as "warmongering media" were preparing a third World War with targeted disinformation. These media would therefore have to be silenced. Christians, who did not believe in the secret conspiratorial powers, were "pants-shitting and good-for-nothing" and "real assholes". Because of them, the devil is currently "letting the sow out". With the United States as his tool along with conspiratorial forces, the devil is believed to start an annihilation of 6.5 billion people to reduce mankind "to a minimum". Bankers, politicians and media people are satanic bandits and criminals. The people are believed to be dumbed down by the media and are led to the slaughter by the warmongers like animals without reason. The Protocols of the Elders of Zion would have described the chaos orchestrated by the devil. Thus, Sasek adopted the anti-Semitic conspiracy theory of an alleged world Jewry. Also in a sermon available via Deutschlandfunk, Sasek stated—regarding Protocols—that one does not need to argue about it: "'did the Jews write it or do the Jews implement it?'". We must conclude: it was written and it is being implemented." Furthermore, he recommended reading Hitler's book Mein Kampf and called for distrusting all media. As a goal, he formulated, I am preparing to change the people, to manipulate them, if you will, for my way.

Swiss historian Daniele Ganser then spoke on "Covert warfare: a look behind the scenes of power politics." He emphasized that he had not known Sasek until then and had only learned via Google that Sasek, like himself, was against warmongering. Furthermore, Jürgen Elsässer and Mathias Ebert appeared for the Besorgte Eltern initiative, and U.S. communications scholar Judith A. Reisman appeared as speakers. Ebert and Reisman claimed that current sexology, sex education, and the sexual revolution are a pedophilia conspiracy introduced by sex researcher Alfred Charles Kinsey. Conspiracy directing Western curricula to impose "early sexualization" of children. Ebert advocated a boycott of school sex education, with parents facing imprisonment if necessary. The heterosexual nuclear family, he argued, was the only proper place for children's sex education.

A regular AZK speaker is Andreas Popp (Wissensmanufaktur), a critic of interest oriented towards the National Socialist Gottfried Feder. Other AZK speakers included representatives of the Swiss People's Party (SVP) such as Olivier Kessler, initiator of the "No-Billag" initiative (March 2015), Luzi Stamm (November 2015) and Ulrich Schlüer (October 2016). Cult expert Hugo Stamm criticized such politicians' appearances as irresponsible legitimization for and trivialization of Sasek's cult and conspiracy theories.

The AZK 2016, declared as a "friends' meeting", took place again in the Stadthalle Chur. Sasek again kept the location and speaker secret. Up to 2500 visitors were expected. At AZK 2017, he claimed that many new books by "high-level historians" show "a completely different picture, for example, of Adolf Hitler." He asked his listeners, "Yes, and now, if that was one who comes right after Jesus Christ, what are you doing? If this is one who is of the rank of an apostle?" In response to queries from Rundschau, Sasek replied that the quote was only an extreme example in the context of his speech.

== Media and organizational network ==
In 1997, Sasek founded the Elaion Publishing House and the Community Teaching Service. Since 1999, he has expanded OCG from a family business into a network of commercial subsidiaries, organizations, and media products that disseminate his political mission worldwide. By his own account, since 2012 his companies have produced approximately 100,000 broadcast segments in 42 languages, at 165 film and sound studios, with more than 213 female and male presenters; the segments are said to have been broadcast in 212 countries. In 2006, Sasek directed the film Heroes Die Differently about Arnold Winkelried, a mythical figure in Swiss history, which he initiated. He made other films, which he promoted through his Panorama Filmverleih as moral guides for marriages and families. In 2008, he founded an Anti-Genocide Party (AGP) to oppose an allegedly imminent genocide of "freedom-loving people, Bible believers, Jews and Muslims"; his wife served as vice-president.

Sasek's print and web media address current issues with conspiracy-theory-based commentary, such as on chemtrails, the New World Order, high finance, terrorist attacks, climate change, the euro area crisis, and Germanwings flight 9525. They publish "uncensored" speeches by Muammar al-Gaddafi and Mahmoud Ahmadinejad, warn of an allegedly imminent obligation to implant electronic identity chips for total state surveillance, discredit vaccination campaigns, claim an "AIDS lie", interpret the 2014 Ukraine crisis and the refugee crisis in Europe from 2015 as means of targeted destabilization, and predict a Third World War.

=== Klagemauer TV (kla.tv) ===
Sasek's organization founded the online channel Klagemauer.tv (abbreviated as Kla.TV). Sasek's son Elias heads the station and its Internet team.

Since at least 2016, Kla.TV has published many videos on current political events. In professionally designed studio, anchors present various "news" stories that the "mainstream media" allegedly suppress. According to Meedia observers, the broadcasts are reminiscent of the former news broadcasts by Kopp Verlag, and, like them, attempt to give conspiracy theories an air of creditability.

In May 2019, representatives of Kla.TV and AZK attended a conference of far-right, right-wing populist, and conspiracy ideology media, hosted by the AfD-Bundestagfraktion in the German Bundestag. AfD deputy Nicole Höchst, who had already been interviewed by Kla.TV, accepted wish lists from the representatives to present to the parliamentary group. It was desired, for example, that AfD deputies share only their own posts on Facebook and Twitter, and no longer those of the "system press." These contacts are classified as the formation of right-wing anti-democratic networks. The Federal Office for the Protection of the Constitution hardly monitors esoteric media like those from Sasek's environment so far.

The station spreads far-right, anti-Semitic and general conspiracy theories. An antisemitic claim about September 11, 2001 was spread, according to which the U.S. government itself perpetrated the September 11 attacks. Behind it, he said, was the Rothschild family, which sought control of national banks worldwide. A "financial oligarchy" of the U.S. was using refugee flows to Europe to cause chaos in Germany, divide the population, and drive it into a civil war. In sermons, Sasek claims Freemasons, Bilderberg or a Jewish sect are secret masterminds of such events. The goal of these secret societies, he said, was the almost complete annihilation of humanity and the world domination of the devils they served.

In October 2016, Klagemauer.tv showed the propaganda film Hellstorm by the American neo-Nazi Kyle Hunt. The passage according to which the National Socialists had made Germany a hopeful country again was left out, the credits with hitlergrüssenden children and dancing people in front of swastika flags were retained and deleted only after criticism from the media. Sasek explained that the purpose of the broadcast was "Never again war ... No more war propaganda by US warmongers." Like far-right historical revisionists, he spoke in a sermon of a "commanded" writing of history. The decades-long remembrance of the Holocaust and National Socialism served the devil's plans for world domination. The alleged "constant agitation ... against national consciousness (Holocaust because of national pride)" serves the goal to "dissolve every nation state as well as every religion. From it the 1ne world state with only 1ner world government, with only 1ner world religion, 1ner world currency etc. is to emerge."

On Kla.TV films, elements of QAnon ideology can also be found without direct mention of it, e.g. contributions to the Deep State, to Adrenochrome and alleged satanist child abuse.

=== Youth TV and "OCG Youth" ===
The OCG maintains its own youth organization, the OCG Youth, with its own web presence. As an offer for children and young people Youth TV was founded. The main presenter was Sasek's daughter Anna-Sophie. The Internet station is visually and content-wise like Klagemauer.tv, only with 8- to 20-year-old speakers for the corresponding target group. They, too, are mostly from OCG families, including Sasek's children. The undercover, non-contactable operators could be traced back to the Saseks' "Panorama-Film-Café" in Walzenhausen via the page source text. The speakers claimed, for example, that schools and teachers propagate homosexuality and urge young people to become homosexuals. Ebola was comparable to ordinary influenza; the World Health Organization was using the epidemic as a means to dominate governments. Israel is the world leader in the organ trade and sees this as compensation for the Holocaust. Youth TV, like AZK, represents all varieties of the conspiracy theory scene and packages them as short news items in language suitable for children. The station presents antisemitic, homophobic hate propaganda and rejection of a free lifestyle as normal attitudes and conveys a basic anti-democratic skepticism toward society to young people seeking orientation. Thus he wants to recruit new followers for the OCG. According to a former Youth TV host, Sasek and his associates see themselves in an information war against the mass media. In order to cast doubt on their information, he said, they take their broadcast material unchecked from right-wing populist, conspiracy-theory websites. The cultural scientist Eva Kimminich analyzed the broadcasts as fake news, in which facts were placed in other, invented contexts and thus twisted.

The video clips of both broadcasters coincide in content and often literally, without referring to each other. The address in their imprint, which can be traced back to the Saseks, was changed after media reports about it. The broadcasters do not provide any information about filming locations, producers and editorial offices of their videos. Alleged "studios" in Augsburg, Roth, Nuremberg, Karlsruhe and Dresden have no addresses. Adults, young people and children from OCG house groups produce sound recordings, television graphics, books and DVDs, for example the association "Leben in Christus" in Mertingen. Sasek denies responsibility for their products, but emphasizes that the producers do everything voluntarily and without coercion. The children involved would hardly get the contents of the conspiracy program. In 2016, the Bayerische Landeszentrale für neue Medien stated that it could not take legal action against programs broadcast from Swiss servers.

Against the allegedly censored mainstream press, Sasek and his followers publish the leaflet Stimme und Gegenstimme (S&G), the Antizensurzeitung (AZZ), and newsletters such as Der Ölbaum and Panorama. On numerous websites of their own, such as www.ivo-sasek.ch, www.klagemauer.tv, and www.anti-zensur.info, Sasek and his followers counter criticism with rebuttals to allegedly set the record straight about "the most serious lies about Ivo Sasek, his family, and his ministry." Starting in 2014, the pamphlet "Voice and Countervoice" was regularly offered at the Monday Vigils for Peace events and sold as "serious reporting that helps establish the truth."

=== Hacker action ===
Starting in 2020, Sasek's media spread COVID-19 misinformation and stoked fears about vaccination against the virus. In response, the hacker collective Anonymous announced in July 2020 that it would expose Sasek's OCG activities as part of its Operation Tinfoil. In two weeks, the activists hacked several OCG websites and servers, including its youth channel Kla.TV. The online activists hacked Sasek's website lügen-barometer.info and redirected visitors to an article critical of OCG. They also gained access to Kla.TV's database and administrators' area, allowing them to sabotage the broadcast schedule. Among other things, the name of the controversial Swiss historian Daniele Ganser was frequently in the database.

They thus had 30,000 emails and more than 20 gigabytes of internal documents, which they published gradually. Beginning on July 24, 2020, Anonymous posted OCG documents online showing Sasek's media network, production locations, takeover of KlaTV content by cable stations, child abuse, and OCG contacts with Scientology. Sasek attributed the hacking attack to Antifa in two videos, calling the hackers "virtual hitmen" in the service of hostile mass media. Anonymous countered Sasek's claim with its own independent video describing the cult's intentions and structures, saying Sasek was relentlessly exploiting the current COVID-19 pandemic and insecurity of many people with his anti-Semitic-esoteric conspiracy ideologies, including financially. Anonymous announced further actions against the OCG and its propaganda broadcasters.

== Classification ==
The state churches as well as free churches classify Sasek's teachings as heresy. For representatives of the mainline churches, his messages show typical characteristics of a cult. The sect commissioners of the Evangelical Church in Germany (EKD) describe the OCG as a Christian fundamentalist group whose strict understanding of faith combines with current conspiracy theories. Scientific studies refuted Sasek's educational advice: Corporal punishment is pedagogically pointless, harms child development when used systematically, and creates a spiral of violence. The Swiss Evangelical Alliance (SEA) and the Association of Evangelical Free Churches and Congregations in Switzerland distanced themselves from any form of physical violence in education. In the Christian fundamentalist scene, however, Sasek's theses are discussed; his patriarchal family model and his educational ideas find imitators. Other Christian splinter groups more often form alliances of convenience with the OCG, although they usually reject Sasek's claim to be an apostle and prophet.

The cult researcher Georg Otto Schmid (Protestant Information Center: Churches - Sects - Religions) opined in 2014 that the OCG had shrunk. Sasek had changed from a conservative fundamentalist to an esotericist and world conspirator. He only finds followers whose world conspiracy view coincides with biblical faithfulness, not among larger segments of the population. The association Freiwillige Selbstkontrolle Multimedia-Diensteanbieter (FSM) classified Youth TV as a danger to children and young people, however, because the channel presented conspiracy theories like youth news, created a reference to the children's lifeworld through direct address, and caused "socio-ethical disorientation" through an appeal character. In July 2015, the city council of Frauenfeld banned Pegida rallies at which Sasek was scheduled to speak for security reasons. Its influence extends beyond the OCG to esotericists, Holocaust deniers, Scientologists and right-wing conspiracy theorists. Via the Internet, groups like the Saseks are attracting greater attention, according to the association Sekten-Info NRW. For children, the propagation of fear, social isolation and ineffective esoteric healing methods are particularly dangerous. Against it schools would have to promote the medium authority of young people and adults.

For publicist Matthias Pöhlmann, "the Swiss preacher of doom is manifestly not only part of, but a crucial driver for a broad-based anti-democratic Crossfront strategy."

== Publications (selection) ==
- Shaking: causes - effects - ways out. 4th supplemented edition, Elaion (self-published), Walzenhausen 2007.
- Simon, David and Loisa Sasek: Mama, please chastise me! 2nd revised and supplemented edition, Elaion (self-published), Walzenhausen 2002.

== Literature ==
- Matthias Pöhlmann: Organic Christ Generation / Anti-Censorship Coalition / Ivo Sasek. In: Matthias Pöhlmann, Christine Jahn (eds. on behalf of the VELKD): Handbuch Weltanschauungen, Religiöse Gemeinschaften, Freikirchen. (with CD-ROM) Gütersloher Verlagshaus / Random House, Gütersloh 2015, ISBN 978-3-579-08224-0, pp. 378–390.
- Claudia Knepper: Harmony, Obedience, and Punishment. Ivo Sasek's teaching on child rearing. In: Materialdienst der Evangelischen Zentralstelle für Weltanschauungsfragen. 4 / 2011, pp. 132–139. (text-excerpt online)
- Harald Lamprecht: Organic Christ Generation. Ivo Sasek and his movement. Materialdienst der Evangelischen Zentralstelle für Weltanschauungsfragen. 4 / 2003, PP. 132-143

== TV reports ==
- Radical Christians - My exit from the OCG (Part 1). In: Reporter (SRF), 13 April 2022 (YouTube; Swiss German, with German subtitles).
- Radical Christians - My exit from the OCG (Part 2). In: Reporter (SRF), April 20, 2022 (YouTube; Swiss German, with German subtitles).
- Christliche Sekte OCG: Sohn des Sektenführers packt aus | STRG_F Christian sect OCG: Son of sect leader unpacks. From CTRL_F
