= Staad railway station =

Railway station in Switzerland

Staad
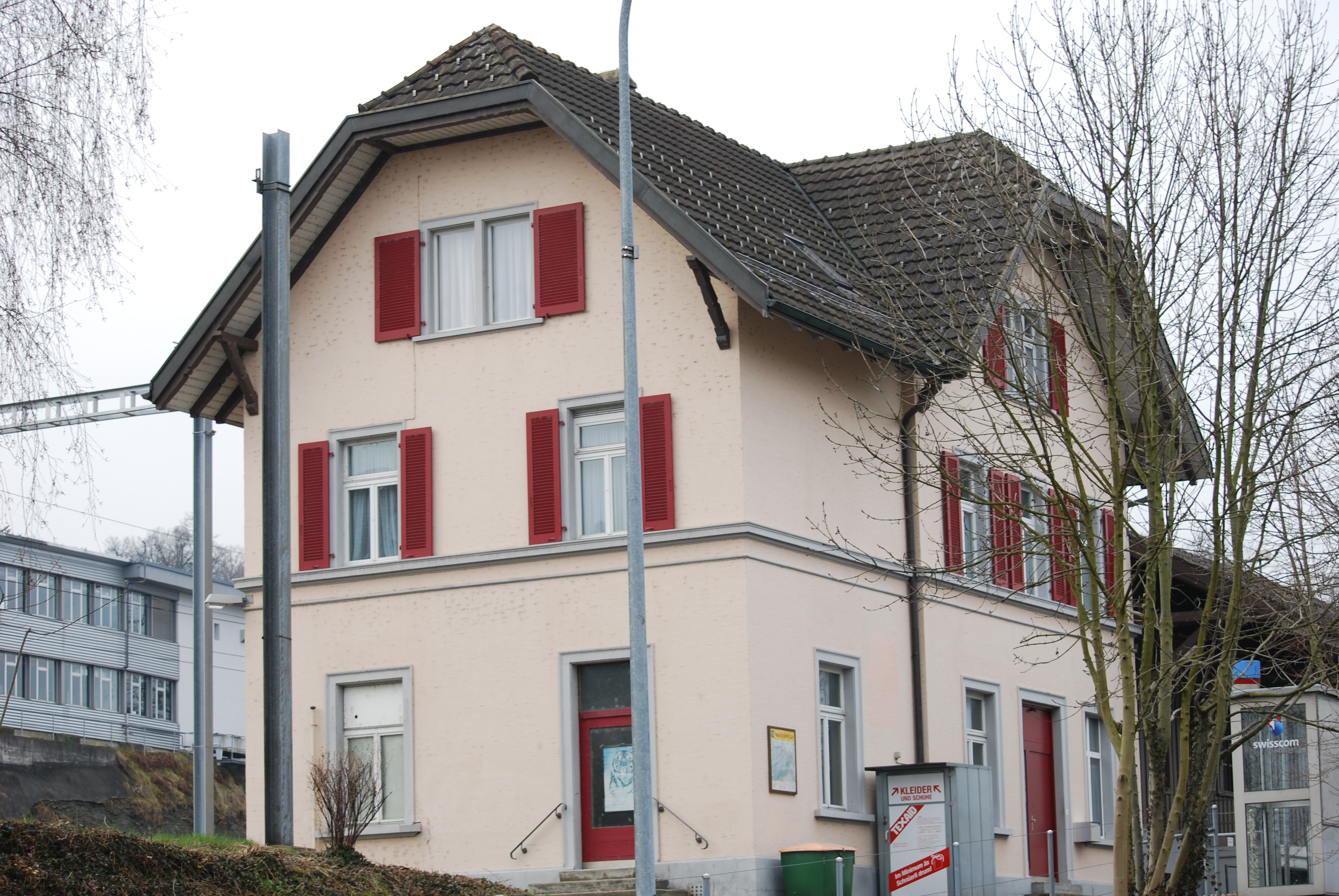
- The station building in 2013

General information
- Location: Thal; Switzerland
- Coordinates: 47°29′N 9°32′E
- Elevation: 402 m (1,319 ft)
- Owner: Swiss Federal Railways
- Line: Chur–Rorschach line
- Train operators: Thurbo; Südostbahn

Other information
- Fare zone: 231 / 233 (Tarifverbund Ostwind)

Services
Preceding station	St. Gallen S-Bahn	Following station
Rorschach towards Nesslau-Neu St. Johann	S2	Rheineck towards Altstätten SG
Rorschach towards Rapperswil	S4	Rheineck towards Sargans
Rorschach towards Weinfelden	S5	Rheineck towards St. Margrethen
Rorschach towards Winterthur	SN22 Limited service	Rheineck towards Heerbrugg
Location
- Location within Switzerland Location within Canton of St. Gallen

Staad railway station (German: Bahnhof Staad) is a railway station in Thal, in the Swiss canton of St. Gallen. It is an intermediate stop on the Chur–Rorschach line.

== Services ==
As of the December 2023 timetable change, the following services stop at Staad:

- St. Gallen S-Bahn:
  - S2 / S4: half-hourly service between Wattwil and Altstätten SG via St. Gallen and hourly service to Rapperswil, Sargans, and Nesslau-Neu St. Johann.
  - S5: hourly service between Weinfelden and St. Margrethen.

During weekends, the station is served by a nighttime S-Bahn service (SN22), offered by Ostwind fare network, and operated by Thurbo for St. Gallen S-Bahn.

- St. Gallen S-Bahn SN22: hourly service to Winterthur and to Heerbrugg, via St. Gallen.

== See also ==
- Bodensee S-Bahn
- Rail transport in Switzerland
