= AZK =

AZK may refer to:

- ZAK, sterile alpha motif and leucine zipper containing kinase AZK
- Anti-Censorship-Coalition (German: Anti-Zensur-Koalition), a right wing organisation founded by Ivo Sasek
- Azalhelikopter, an Azerbaijani airline (ICAO airline designator: AZK)
- Skelton Airport, a former airport in Alaska (FAA location identifier: AZK)
- Keven "AZK" Larivière, an esports player banned in the Counter-Strike match fixing scandal
