= Rheineck–Walzenhausen mountain railway =

Rack railway in eastern Switzerland

Coordinates: 47.45938°N 9.59651°E

Rheineck–Walzenhausen mountain railway (S26)
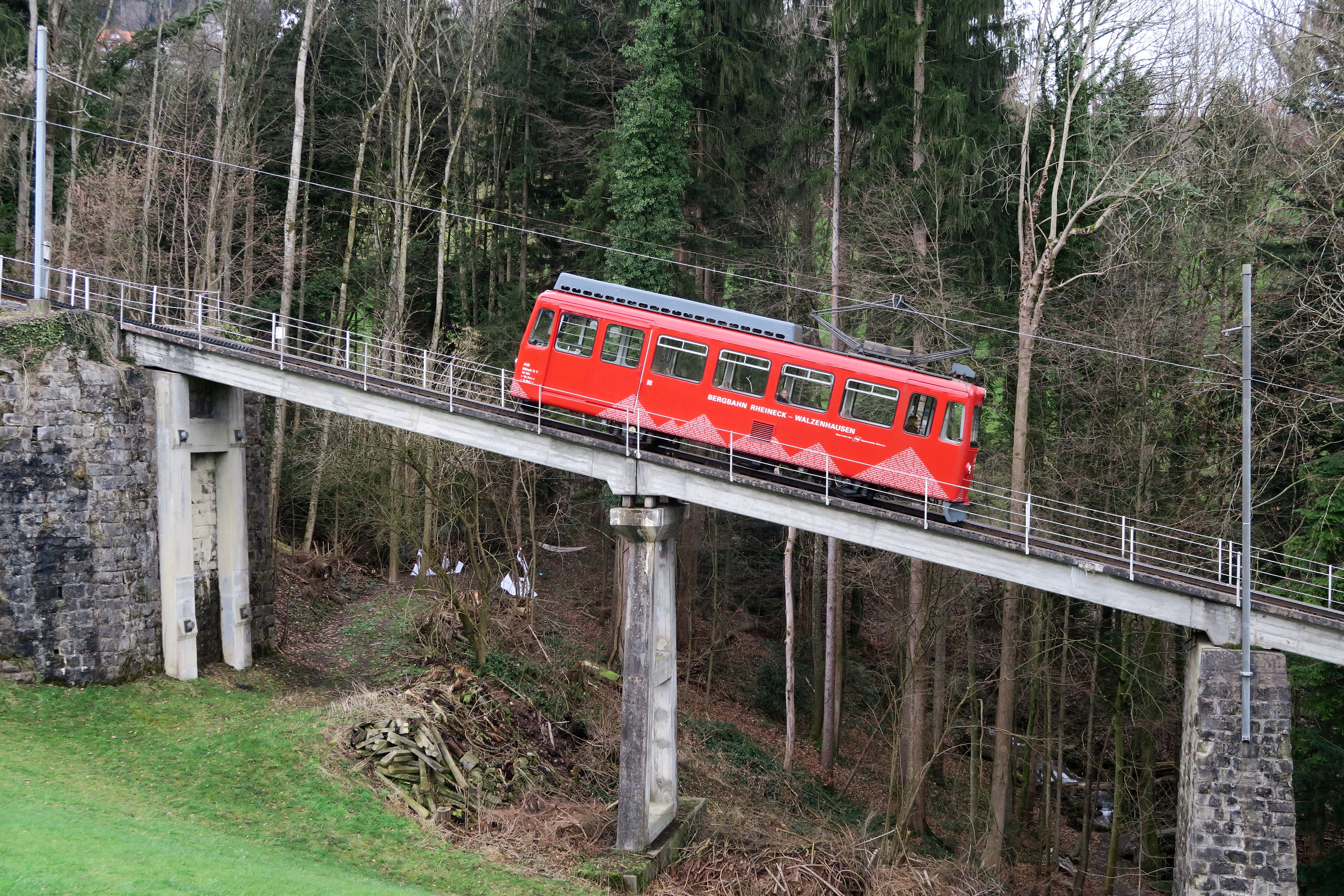
- BDeh 1/2 1 on Hoftobel Bridge (2015)

Overview
- Status: Operational
- Owner: Appenzell Railways (since 2006); Bergbahn Rheineck-Walzenhausen AG
- Locale: St. Gallen/Appenzell, Switzerland
- Termini: Rheineck; Walzenhausen
- Stations: 4 (including Ruderbach, Hof)

Service
- Type: rack railway (since 1958)
- System: St. Gallen S-Bahn, Bodensee S-Bahn
- Route number: 858 (earlier: 115d)
- Rolling stock: 1

Technical
- Line length: 1.9 kilometres (1.2 mi)
- Number of tracks: Single track
- Rack system: Riggenbach
- Track gauge: 1,200 mm (3 ft 11 1/4 in)
- Electrification: 600 V DC
- Highest elevation: 672 m (2,205 ft)
- Maximum incline: 25%

The Rheineck–Walzenhausen mountain railway (German: Bergbahn Rheineck–Walzenhausen; RhW) is a 1.9 kilometres (1.18 mi) long mixed adhesion-rack railway in Switzerland. It links Rheineck station, in the municipality of Rheineck and the canton of St Gallen, with the village and health resort of Walzenhausen, in the canton of Appenzell Ausserrhoden. Passenger service on the line now forms part of the St. Gallen S-Bahn, branded as the S26. The S26 is also part of the Bodensee S-Bahn.

The line is owned and operated by the Appenzell Railways company (Appenzeller Bahnen, AB), which also operates several other railway lines in the two Appenzell cantons.

== History ==
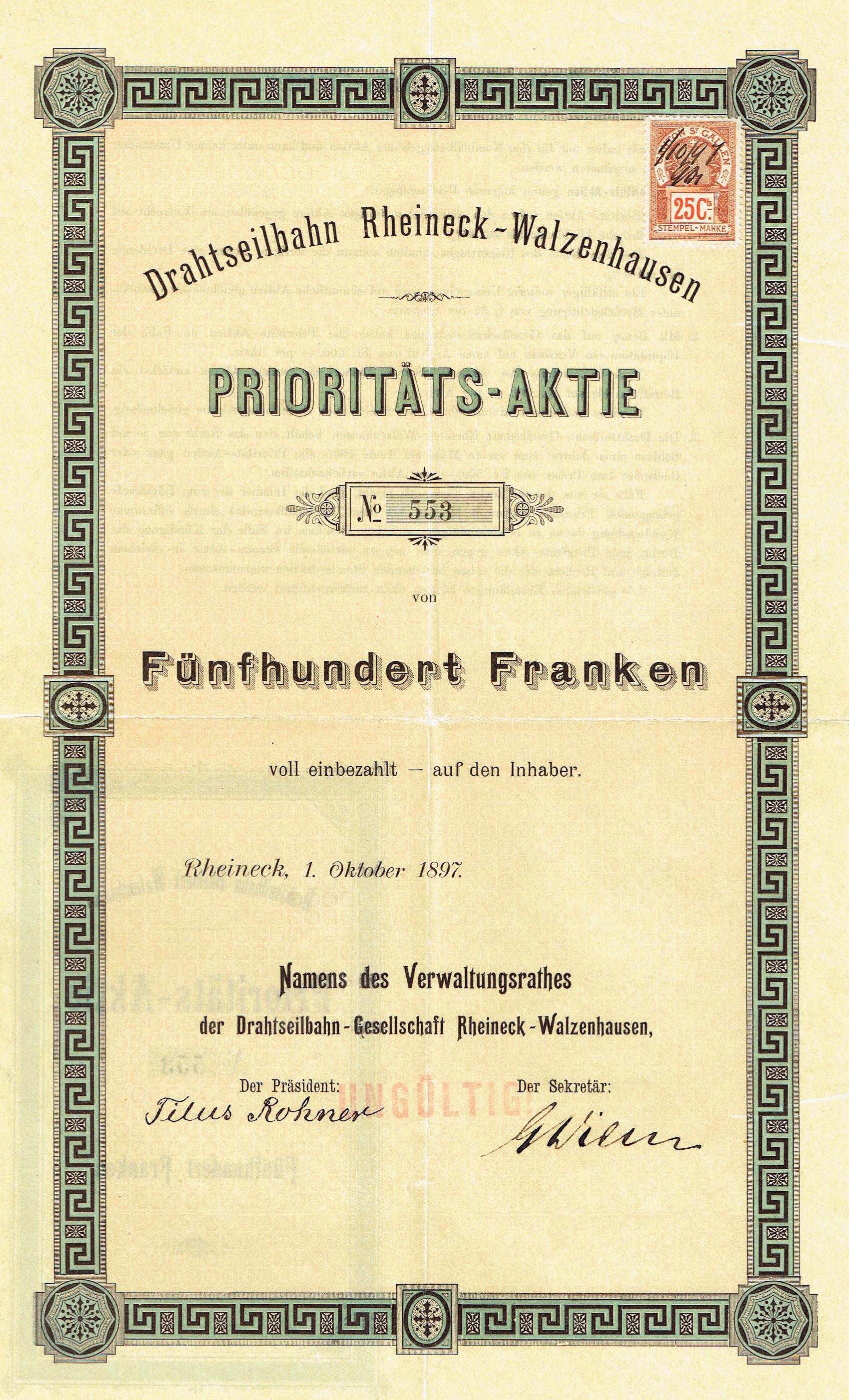
Share of the Drahtseilbahn-Gesellschaft Rheineck-Walzenhausen, issued 1. October 1897

The concession for the construction of a rail link between Rheineck and Walzenhausen was granted in 1889. The Drahtseilbahn-Gesellschaft Rheineck-Walzenhausen company started construction in 1895 and the line opened on 27 June 1896. As constructed, the line was a water operated funicular railway that linked the current upper station at Walzenhausen with a lower station at Ruderbach, some 0.7 kilometres (0.43 mi) short of Rheineck station. In 1909, a connecting tram line was opened, initially operated by a gasoline-powered tram and later electrified. The owning company would subsequently change its name to Bergbahn Rheineck-Walzenhausen AG.

By the 1950s the funicular was at the end of its technical life span, and it was finally closed on 1 May 1958 as the result of a broken axle. That year, work commenced on the conversion of the funicular to a rack railway, using the Riggenbach rack system but retaining the funicular track gauge of 1,200 mm (3 ft 11 1/4 in). The connecting tramway was regauged and connected to the new rack railway, although retaining its adhesion operation, and the resulting line was electrified at 600 V DC. To operate the new line, a single four-wheeled railcar, BDeh 1/2 no. 1, was built in 1958.

In 2006 the Bergbahn Rheineck-Walzenhausen AG company was merged into the Appenzell Railways. The 1958-built car remains the only rolling stock on the line, and in 2014 was given a full overhaul, returning to work in May of that year. During the overhaul period, the line was replaced by a bus service.

== Operation ==
S26

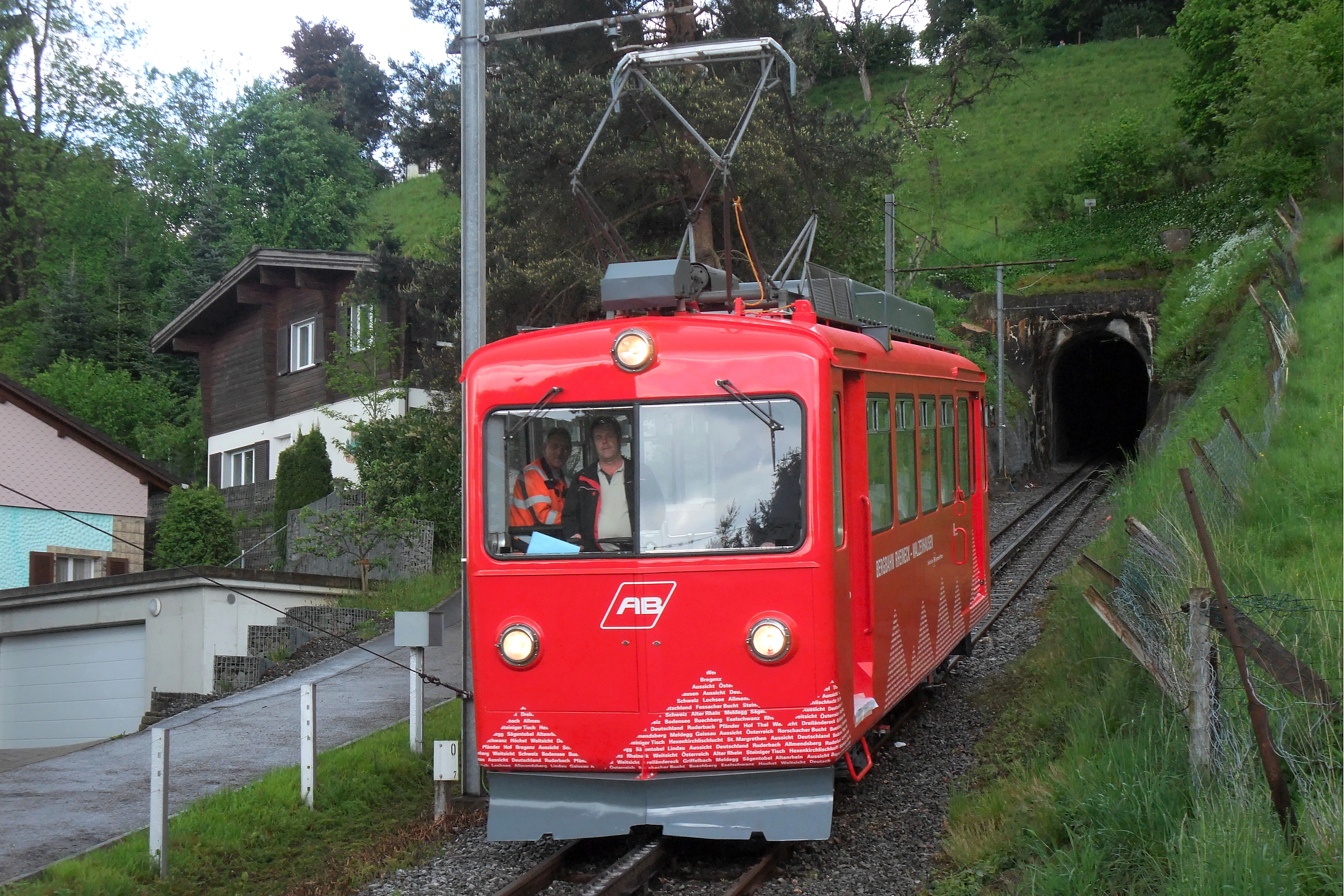
- BDeh 1/2 1 near Ruderbach

Overview
- Service type: St. Gallen S-Bahn service
- Current operator: Appenzell Railways (AB)

Route
- Termini: Rheineck; Walzenhausen
- Stops: 3
- Average journey time: 6 minutes (uphill); 9 minutes (downhill)
- Service frequency: every 30 to 60 minutes

On-board services
- Baggage facilities: Baggage compartment

Technical
- Rolling stock: Class BDeh 1/2 1

The route is 1.9 kilometres (1.18 mi) in length, has a track gauge of 1,200 mm (3 ft 11 1/4 in) and is electrified using a supply at 600 V DC, supplied by overhead line. Approximately 1.2 kilometres (0.75 mi) of the line is equipped with the Riggenbach rack system, whist the rest of the line operates using rail adhesion. The height difference between the terminal stations is 272 m (892 ft 5 in), and the maximum gradient is 25 %.

The S26 service starts from its own terminus, located on platform 1 of Rheineck's main line railway station. For about the first 600 m (1,968 ft 6 in) the line parallels the Swiss Federal Railway's Chur–Rorschach railway, before bearing right and crossing two roads on a level crossing to reach the stop at Ruderbach. The station building here incorporates the line's single track depot, accessed via the line's only set of points. Here the line joins the route of its funicular predecessor, and engages rack operation. The remainder of the line climbs at a steep gradient in a straight line to Walzenhausen, passing first through a 315 m (1,033 ft 6 in) long tunnel, and then across a 153 m (502 ft 0 in) long iron bridge over the Hexenkirchlitobel ravine. Finally it enters the terminus through a 70 m (229 ft 8 in) long tunnel under the Kurhaus.

The S26 operates one or two return journeys per hour, depending on the time of day, with a single journey time of 6-9 minutes. Service is provided by the line's single four-wheeled railcar, BDeh 1/2 1. If this is unavailable for any reason, a substitute bus service is provided.

A bus service links Walzenhausen with the upper station of the Rorschach–Heiden railway at Heiden, thus providing the opportunity for a round trip via both mountain railways. The final link between Rorschach and Rheineck can be achieved using the St. Margrethen–Rorschach line, or by ship on Lake Constance.

=== Route ===
S26 Rheineck – Walzenhausen

- Rheineck
- Ruderbach (stops only on request)
- Walzenhausen

== Future ==
In September 2022, Stadler Rail announced that it had won a contract from the Appenzell Railways to supply a fully automated rack-and-adhesion railcar for use on the line. The car will operate with no staff on board, but a control room will be able to intervene by remote control if required. The automation project, including the price of the car, will cost SFr25m and is scheduled to be in use in 2026. The project was then revised to open in 2027 at a cost of SFr35m.

== Gallery ==
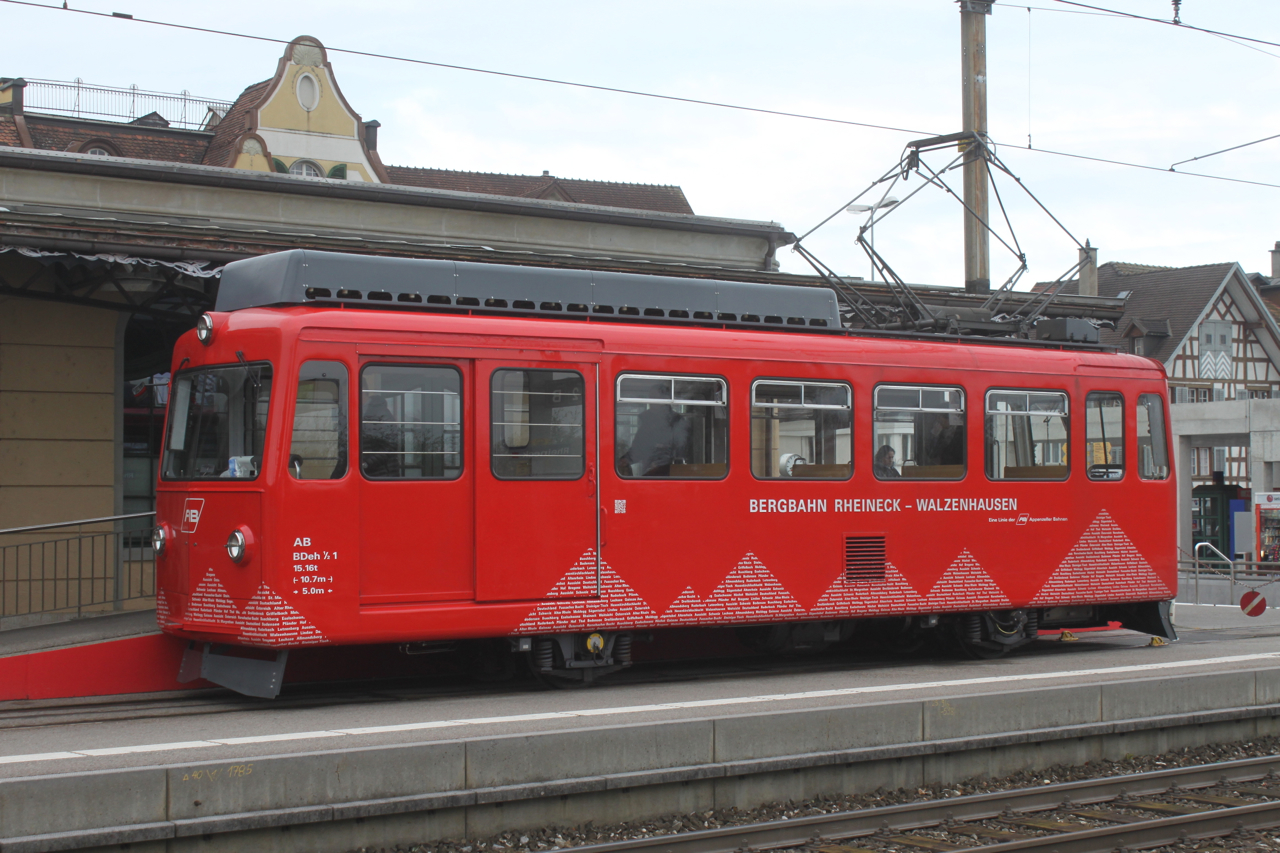
BDeh 1/2 1 after its 2014 overhaul, at its lower terminus

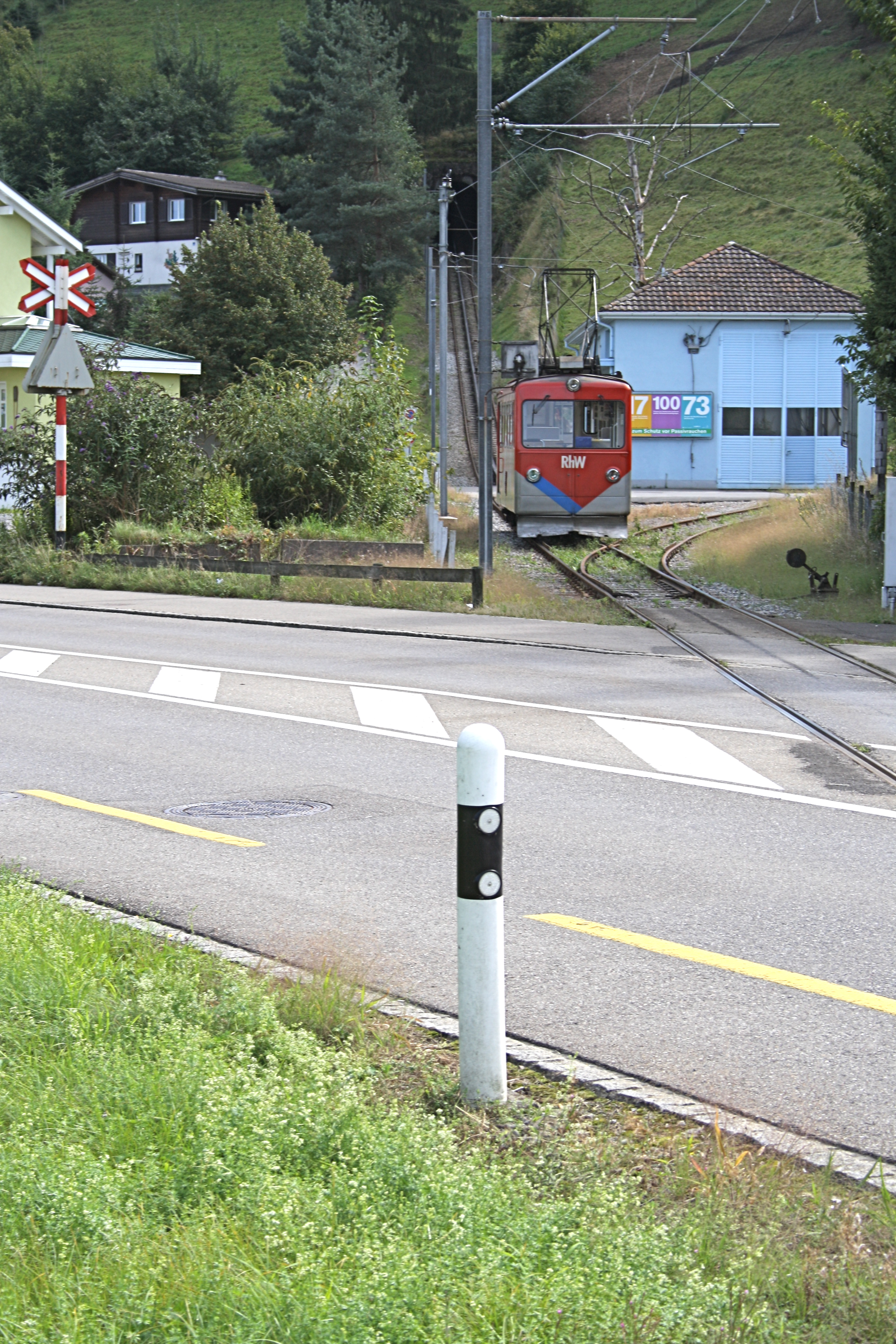
Car near Ruderbach stop and depot. Note the transition from the level adhesion section to the rack operated former funicular

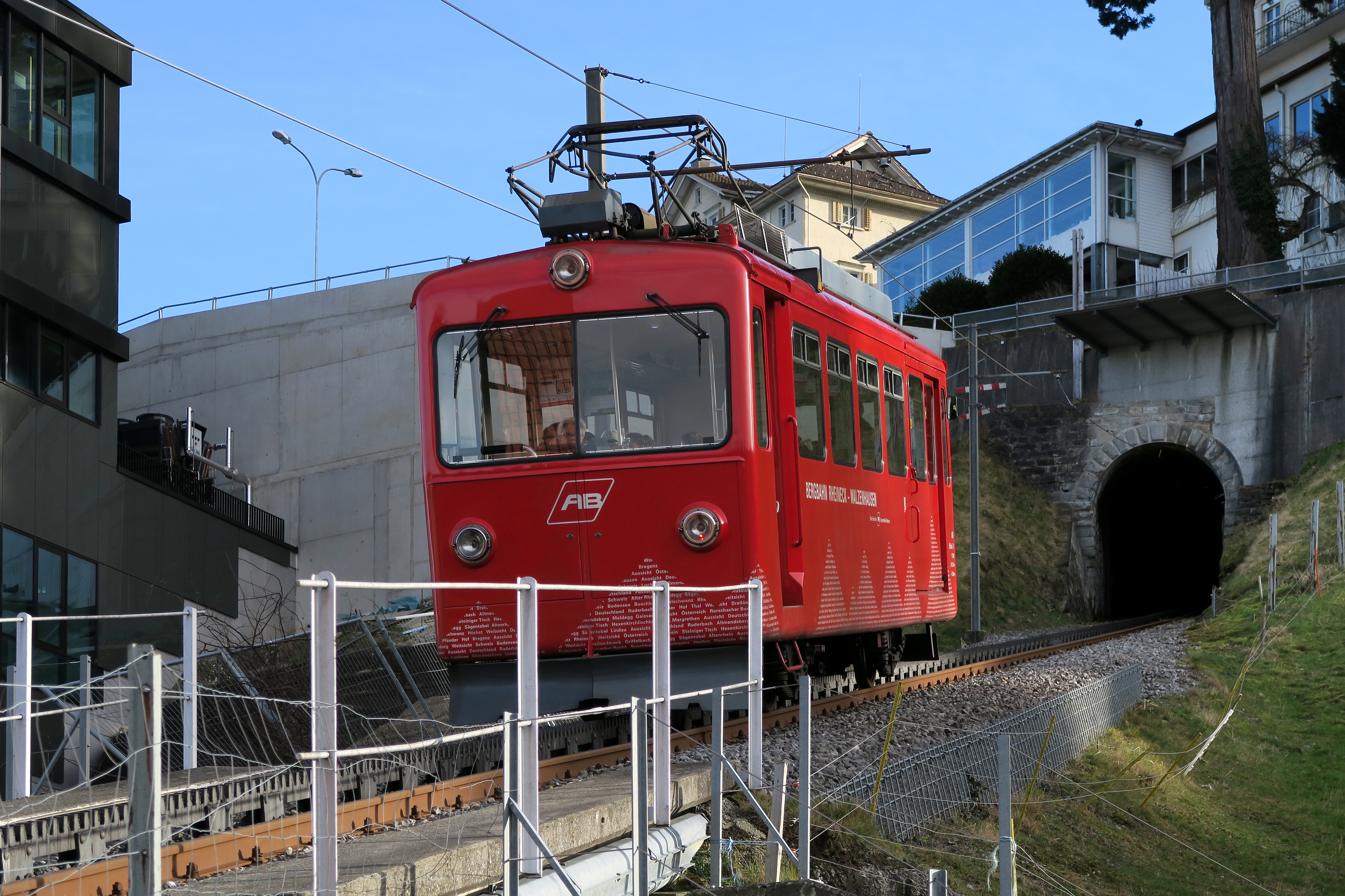
BDeh 1/2 1 near its top station

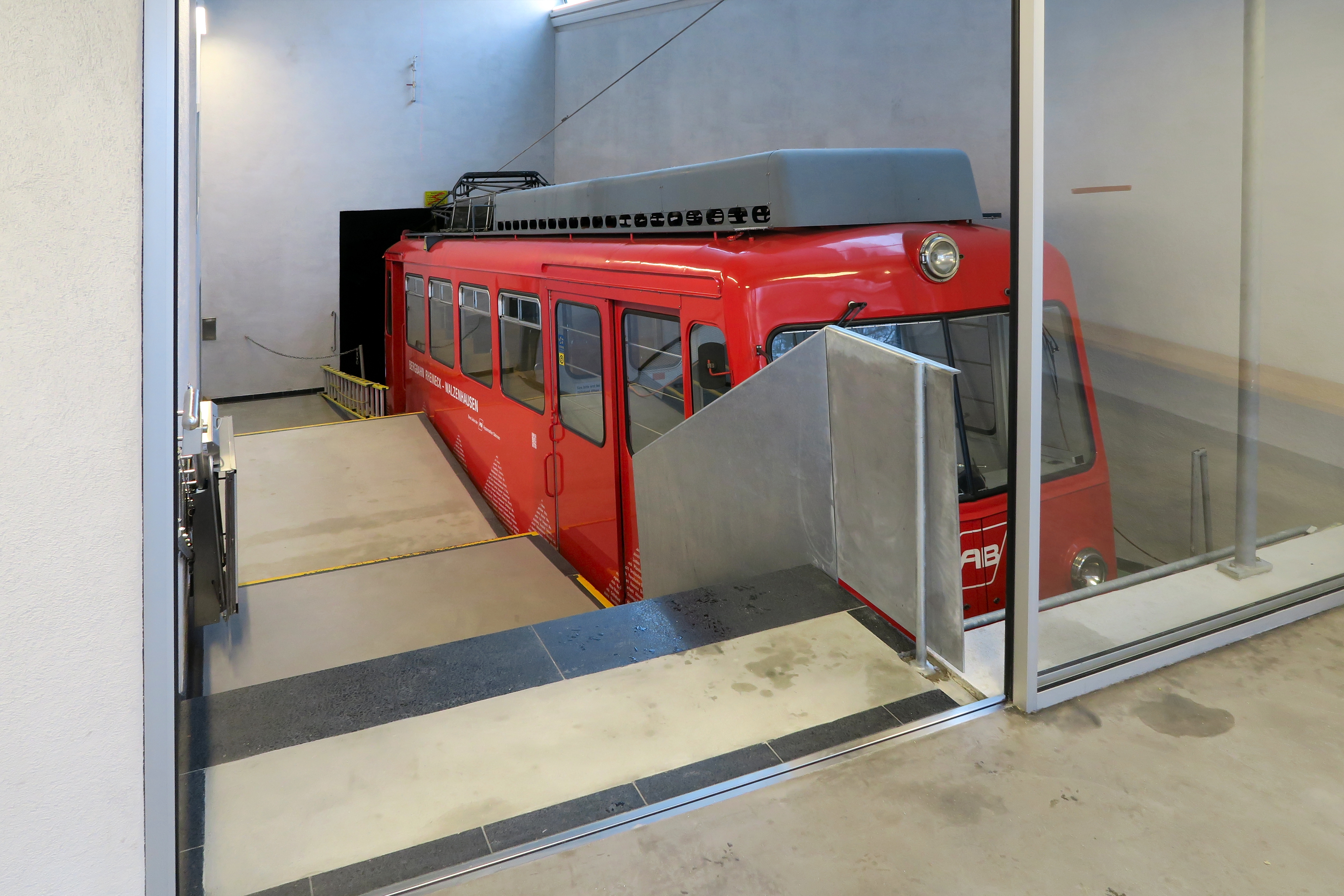
Car at its top station in Walzenhausen
