= Sylvia Stolz =

German Holocaust denier and former lawyer (born 1963)

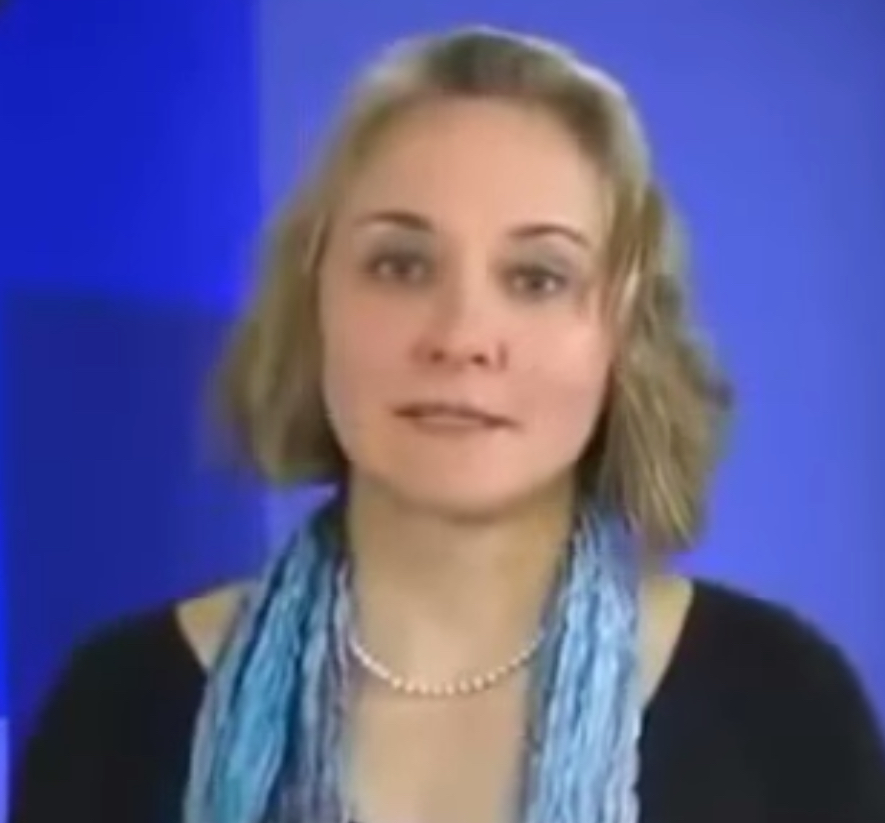
- Sylvia Stolz in 2013
- Born: 16 August 1963 (age 63)
- Occupation: Lawyer
- Criminal charge: Holocaust denial
- Penalty: Five years' imprisonment

Sylvia Stolz (born 16 August 1963) is a German Neo-Nazi, convicted Holocaust denier and former lawyer.

== Ernst Zündel and Stolz trials ==
Stolz was a member of the defense team of Holocaust denier Ernst Zündel, who was tried in March 2006 for distributing antisemitic literature, including Holocaust denial material, via a website. Stolz disrupted Zündel's initial trial and was barred from the courtroom because of her behavior. She had said the judges deserved the death penalty for "offering succour to the enemy" and had signed a legal document "Heil Hitler". In her view, Germany has been under a "foreign occupation which has portrayed Adolf Hitler as a devil for 60 years, but that is not true." After ignoring the bar, Stolz had to be physically removed from the court. During the March 2006 trial she called the Holocaust "the biggest lie in world history". She also defended Holocaust denier Horst Mahler.

Zündel was eventually convicted in February 2007, and served a five-year term of imprisonment. Stolz was convicted in January 2008 of the same, and additional offenses, and sentenced to a 3 1/2-year prison term. She was also banned from practicing law for five years.

== Since 2011 ==
Stolz was released from Aichach Prison on 13 April 2011.

In 2012, she was invited by Ivo Sasek, the founder of the Anti-Zensur-Koalition (AZK) (Anti-Censorship Coalition), as a guest speaker at the AZK's 8th conference held at Chur, Graubünden, Switzerland, where she spoke on 24 November 2012. In January 2013, Daniel Kettiger, a Bernese lawyer, filed a criminal complaint with the Graubünden Prosecutor's Office against both Stolz and Sasek. He accused Stolz of violating Swiss race law, Art. 261^{bis} of the Swiss Criminal Code, in that she stated that the Holocaust has never been proved by a court of law, that findings on the location of the crime, method of murder, number killed, time period of crime, perpetrators, bodies or evidence of murder are lacking as is finding as fact that there was Nazi intention to kill Jews. Sasek was accused of failing to act as a responsible moderator.

On 25 February 2015, Stolz was sentenced to 20 months' imprisonment by a court in Munich for the speech she delivered in 2012. On 15 February 2018, the sentence was reduced to 18 months, time served to be reckoned from 23 May 2019, the date of arrest.

== Personal life ==
Stolz was previously in a relationship with right-wing extremist and fellow Holocaust denier Horst Mahler.
