= Rheineck railway station =

Railway station in Switzerland

Rheineck
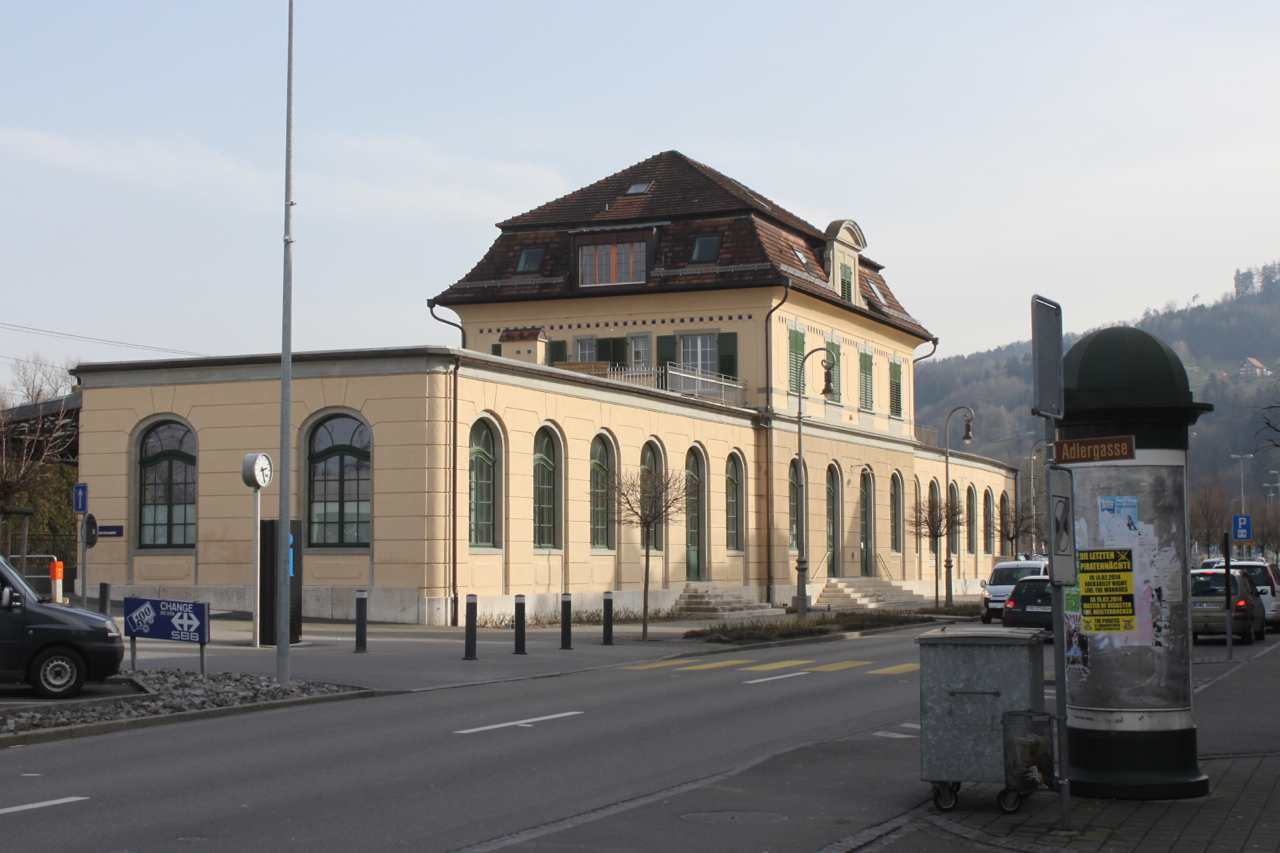
- The station building in 2014

General information
- Location: Rheineck; Switzerland
- Coordinates: 47°28′01″N 9°35′27″E
- Elevation: 400 m (1,300 ft)
- Owner: Swiss Federal Railways
- Lines: Chur–Rorschach line; Rheineck–Walzenhausen line
- Train operators: Thurbo; Südostbahn; Appenzell Railways
- Connections: Lake Constance ferries; PostBus local buses

Other information
- Fare zone: 233 / 234 (Tarifverbund Ostwind)

Services
Preceding station	St. Gallen S-Bahn	Following station
Staad towards Nesslau-Neu St. Johann	S2	St. Margrethen towards Altstätten SG
Staad towards Rapperswil	S4	St. Margrethen towards Sargans
Staad towards Weinfelden	S5	St. Margrethen Terminus
Terminus	S26	Ruderbach towards Walzenhausen
Staad towards Winterthur	SN22 Limited service	St. Margrethen towards Heerbrugg
Location
- Location within Switzerland Location within Canton of St. Gallen

Rheineck railway station (German: Bahnhof Rheineck) is a railway station that serves the municipality of Rheineck, in the canton of St. Gallen, Switzerland. The station is located on the eastern edge of Rheineck village centre, with the A1 motorway, the Alter Rhein river channel and then the border with Austria flanking the opposite side of the station.

== Description ==
The station is an intermediate stop on the St. Margrethen–Rorschach railway line, and is the lower terminus of the Rheineck–Walzenhausen mountain railway. It is served by St. Gallen S-Bahn services S2, S4, and S5, which link Rheineck to the city of St. Gallen and other local towns, and by service S26, which shuttles up to Walzenhausen. Rheineck is also the easterly end of the Swiss shipping services on Lake Constance, and the town's landing stages are located on the Alter Rhein channel. The landing stages are linked to the station by a pedestrian subway under the A1 motorway. Local bus services operate from a bus station adjacent to the station building. There are bus links to the nearby St. Gallen-Altenrhein Airport.

The station has two side platforms, on either side of the twin track main line. The station building abuts the western platform, and is linked to the eastern platform by a pedestrian subway. The Rheineck–Walzenhausen line starts from its own platform, which is actually located on the western mainline platform.

== Services ==
As of the December 2023 timetable change, the following services stop at Rheineck:

- St. Gallen S-Bahn:
  - S2 / S4: half-hourly service between Wattwil and Altstätten SG via St. Gallen and hourly service to Rapperswil, Sargans, and Nesslau-Neu St. Johann.
  - S5: hourly service between Weinfelden and St. Margrethen.
  - S26: hourly or better service to Walzenhausen.

During weekends, the station is served by a nighttime S-Bahn service (SN22), offered by Ostwind fare network, and operated by Thurbo for St. Gallen S-Bahn.

- St. Gallen S-Bahn SN22: hourly service to Winterthur and to Heerbrugg, via St. Gallen.

== Gallery ==
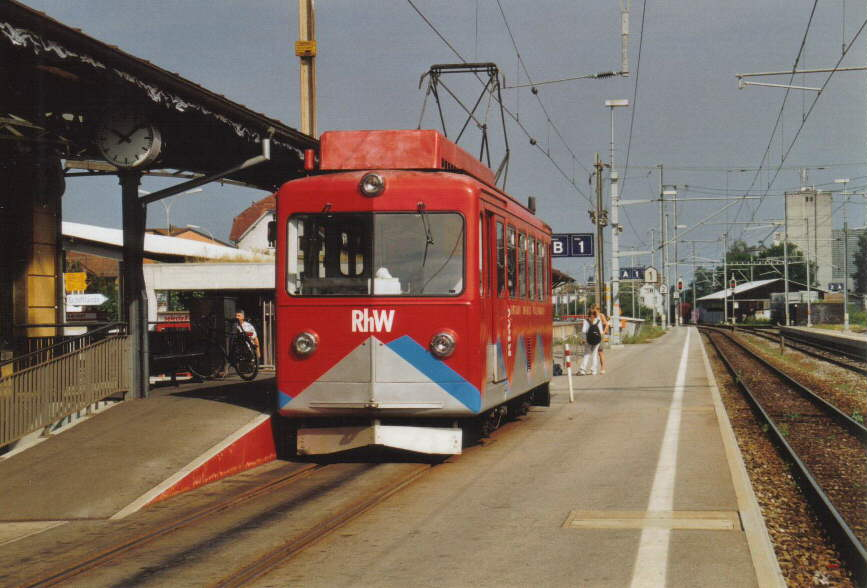
The Rheineck–Walzenhausen train at its terminus

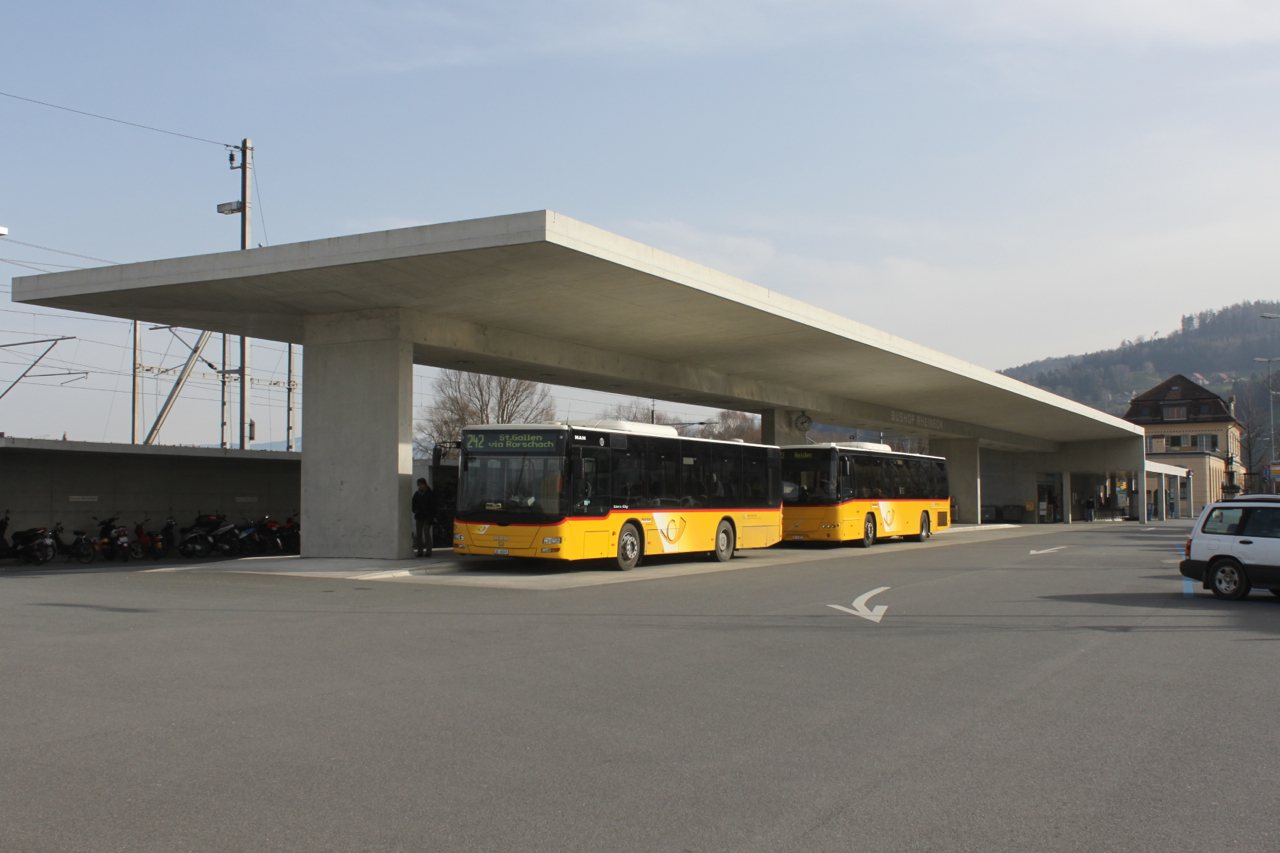
The bus station

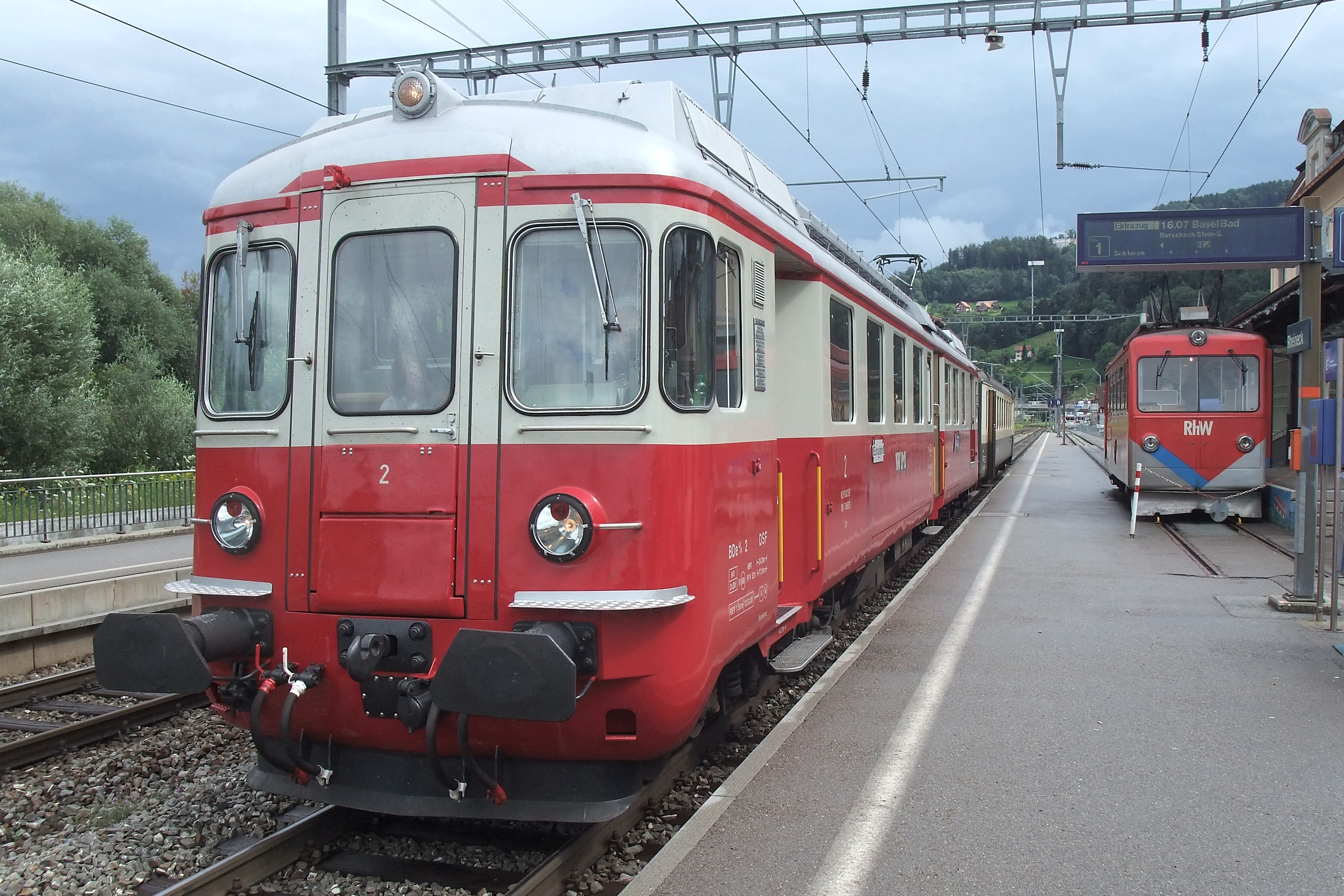
A visiting historic train

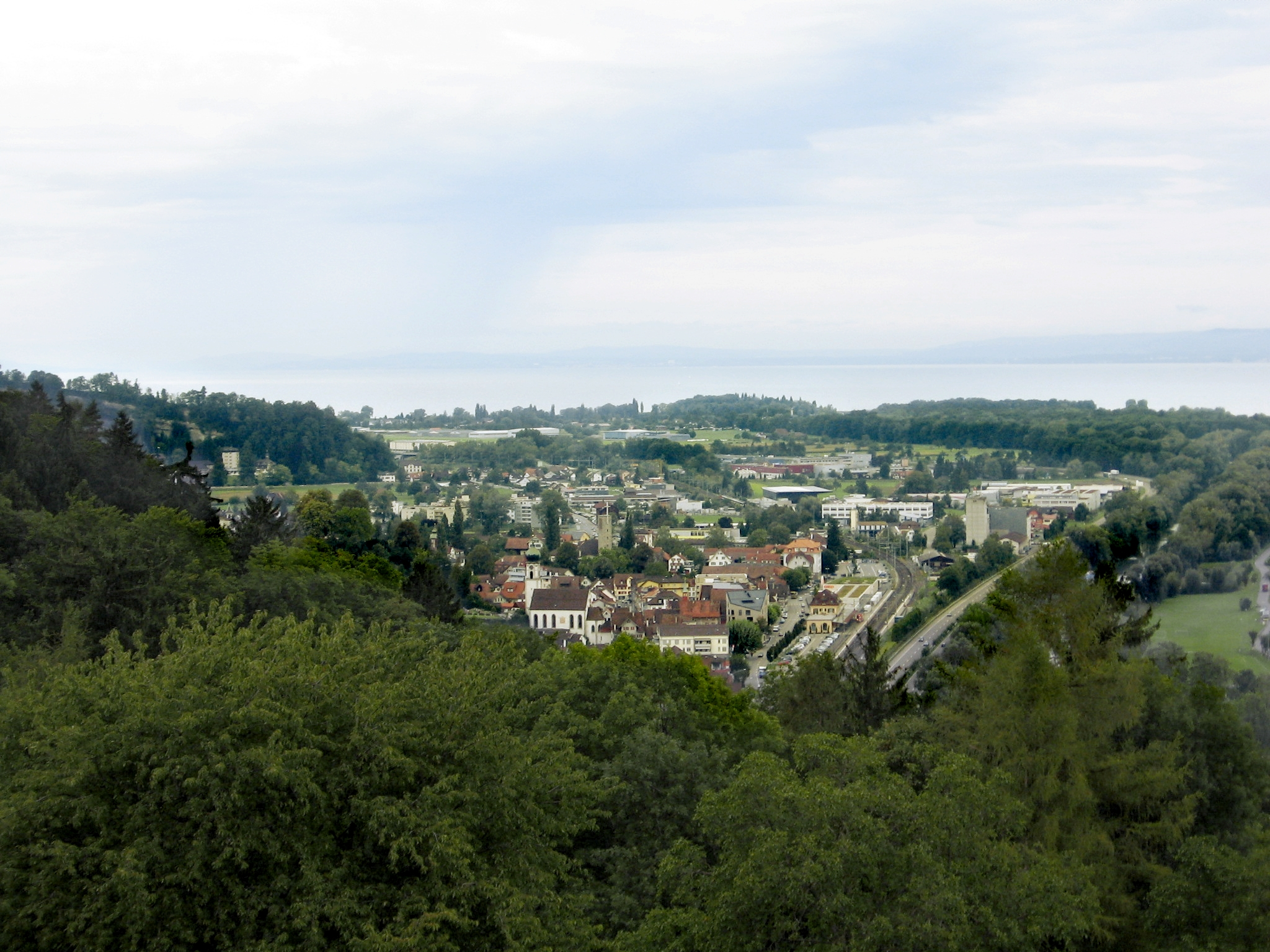
The station in the town

== See also ==
- Bodensee S-Bahn
- Rail transport in Switzerland
