= Ruderbach railway station =

Train station in Switzerland

Ruderbach
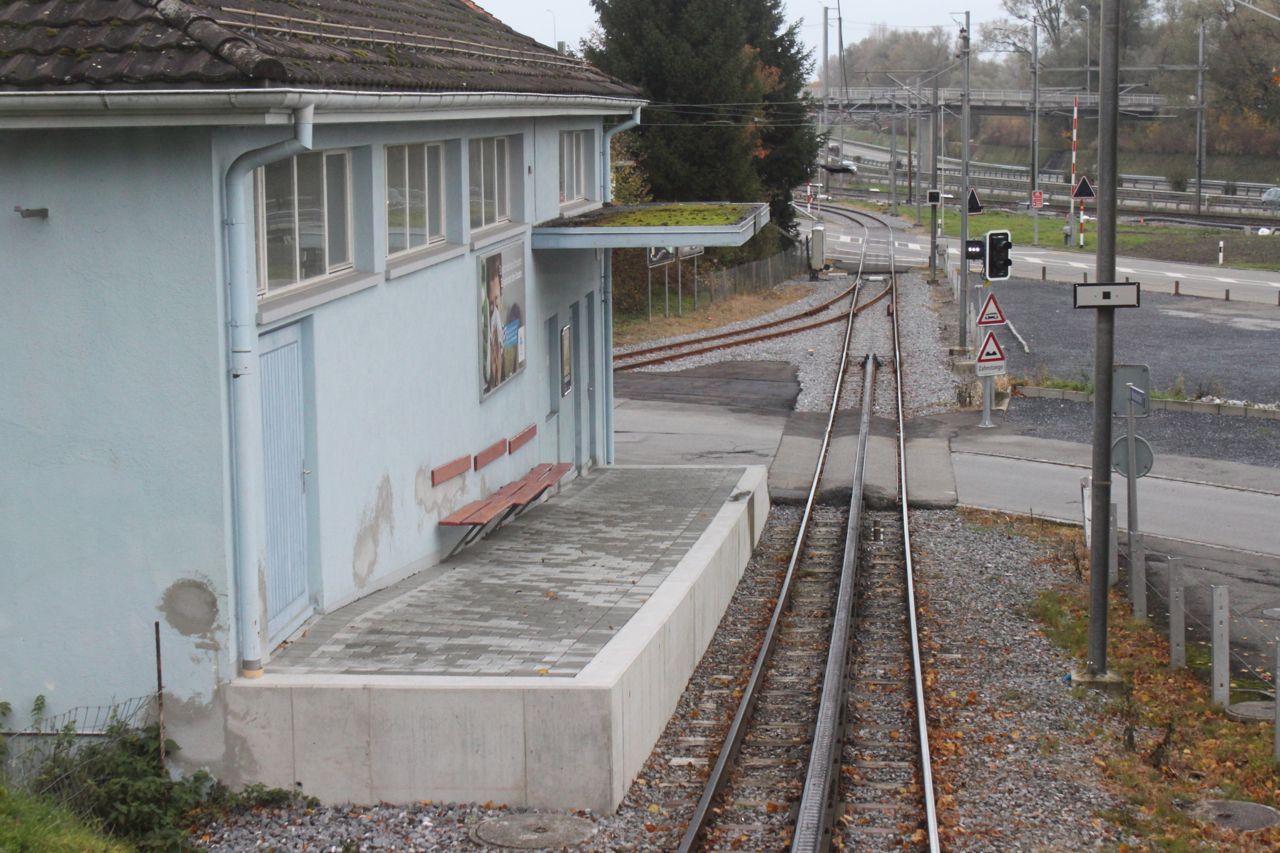
- The station building in 2014

General information
- Location: Switzerland
- Coordinates: 47°27′40″N 9°35′42″E
- Elevation: 445 m (1,460 ft)
- Owner: Appenzell Railways
- Line: Rheineck–Walzenhausen mountain railway
- Train operators: Appenzell Railways

Other information
- Fare zone: 234 (Tarifverbund Ostwind)

Services
| Preceding station | St. Gallen S-Bahn | Following station |
|---|---|---|
| Rheineck Terminus | S26 | Walzenhausen Terminus |
Location
- Location within Switzerland Location within Canton of St. Gallen

Ruderbach railway station (German: Bahnhof Ruderbach) is a railway station in St. Margrethen, in the Swiss canton of St. Gallen. It is the only intermediate station on the Rheineck–Walzenhausen mountain rack railway line of Appenzell Railways.

== Services ==
As of the December 2023 timetable change, the following services stop at Ruderbach (only on request):

- St. Gallen S-Bahn:
  - S26: hourly service to Rheineck and to Walzenhausen.
