= Walzenhausen =

- Municipality
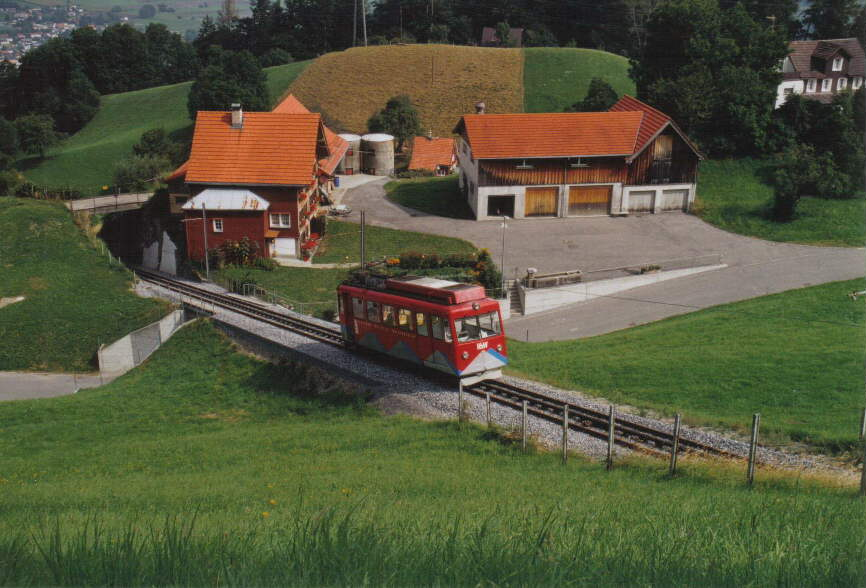

- Flag Coat of arms
- Location of Walzenhausen
- Location within Switzerland Location within Canton of Appenzell Ausserrhoden
- Coordinates: 47°27′N 9°36′E
- Country: Switzerland
- Canton: Appenzell Ausserrhoden
- District: n.a.

Area
  - Total: 6.98 km^{2} (2.69 sq mi)
- Elevation: 672 m (2,205 ft)

Population (December 2008)
  - Total: 2,071
  - Density: 297/km^{2} (768/sq mi)
- Time zone: UTC+01:00 (CET)
  - Summer (DST): UTC+02:00 (CEST)
- Postal code: 9428
- SFOS number: 3037
- ISO 3166 code: CH-AR
- Surrounded by: Au (SG), Berneck (SG), Lutzenberg, Oberegg (AI), Rheineck (SG), Sankt Margrethen (SG), Wolfhalden
- Website: https://www.walzenhausen.ch

Walzenhausen is a municipality in the canton of Appenzell Ausserrhoden in Switzerland.

== History ==
The farm Walzenhausen was mentioned first in 1320. The church was built in 1638 in as little as nine months. This was the establishment of Walzenhausen as a municipality.

In the past textiles played an important role, but today tourism has taken this role. This is facilitated by good public transport links.

== Geography ==
Aerial view by Walter Mittelholzer (1923)

Walzenhausen has an area, as of 2006, of 7 km^{2} (2.7 sq mi). Of this area, 52.4% is used for agricultural purposes, while 34.4% is forested. The rest of the land, (13.1%) is settled.

Walzenhausen is the easternmost village in the canton Appenzell Ausserrhoden. It lies at 670 m (2,200 ft) and offers a panorama of Lake Constance 300 m (980 ft) below.

Grimmenstein monastery is a small exclave of the canton of Appenzell Innerrhoden within the municipality. During the Protestant Reformation Walzenhausen adopted the new faith, while the monastery remained catholic. After centuries of debate and conflict over the monastery lands, in 1870 the federal government declared that land within the monastery walls was part of Innerrhoden.

== Transport ==
The Rheineck–Walzenhausen mountain railway, operating as S26 of S-Bahn St. Gallen, links Walzenhausen with Rheineck railway station located 272 m (892 ft) below on the Chur–Rorschach railway line. The S26 service operates one or two return journeys per hour, depending on the time of day, and offers connections at Rheineck with main line services (S-Bahn and InterRegio) to the city of St. Gallen and other towns. Local buses link Walzenhausen to Heiden and St. Margrethen.

== Demographics ==
Walzenhausen has a population (as of 2008) of 2,071, of which about 16.2% are foreign nationals. Over the last 10 years the population has decreased at a rate of -4.1%. Most of the population (as of 2000) speaks German (92.3%), with Serbo-Croatian being second most common ( 1.7%) and Italian being third ( 1.4%).

As of 2000, the gender distribution of the population was 50.9% male and 49.1% female. The age distribution, as of 2000, in Walzenhausen is; 176 people or 8.1% of the population are between 0–6 years old. 278 people or 12.7% are 6-15, and 98 people or 4.5% are 16–19. Of the adult population, 96 people or 4.4% of the population are between 20 and 24 years old. 646 people or 29.6% are 25–44, and 530 people or 24.3% are 45–64. The senior population distribution is 250 people or 11.5% of the population are between 65 and 79 years old, and 107 people or 4.9% are over 80.

In the 2007 federal election the FDP received 68.4% of the vote.

In Walzenhausen about 68.5% of the population (between age 25-64) have completed either non-mandatory upper secondary education or additional higher education (either university or a Fachhochschule).

Walzenhausen has an unemployment rate of 1.67%. As of 2005, there were 53 people employed in the primary economic sector and about 27 businesses involved in this sector. 323 people are employed in the secondary sector and there are 34 businesses in this sector. 732 people are employed in the tertiary sector, with 72 businesses in this sector.

The historical population is given in the following table:

Historical population
Year	Pop.	±%
1980	2,004	—
1990	2,152	+7.4%
2000	2,134	−0.8%
2005	2,064	−3.3%
2007	2,041	−1.1%

== Notable residents ==
- Carl Lutz (1895–1975), Swiss vice-consul to Hungary during WWII, credited with saving over 62,000 Jews
