= Walzenhausen railway station =

Railway station in Switzerland

Walzenhausen
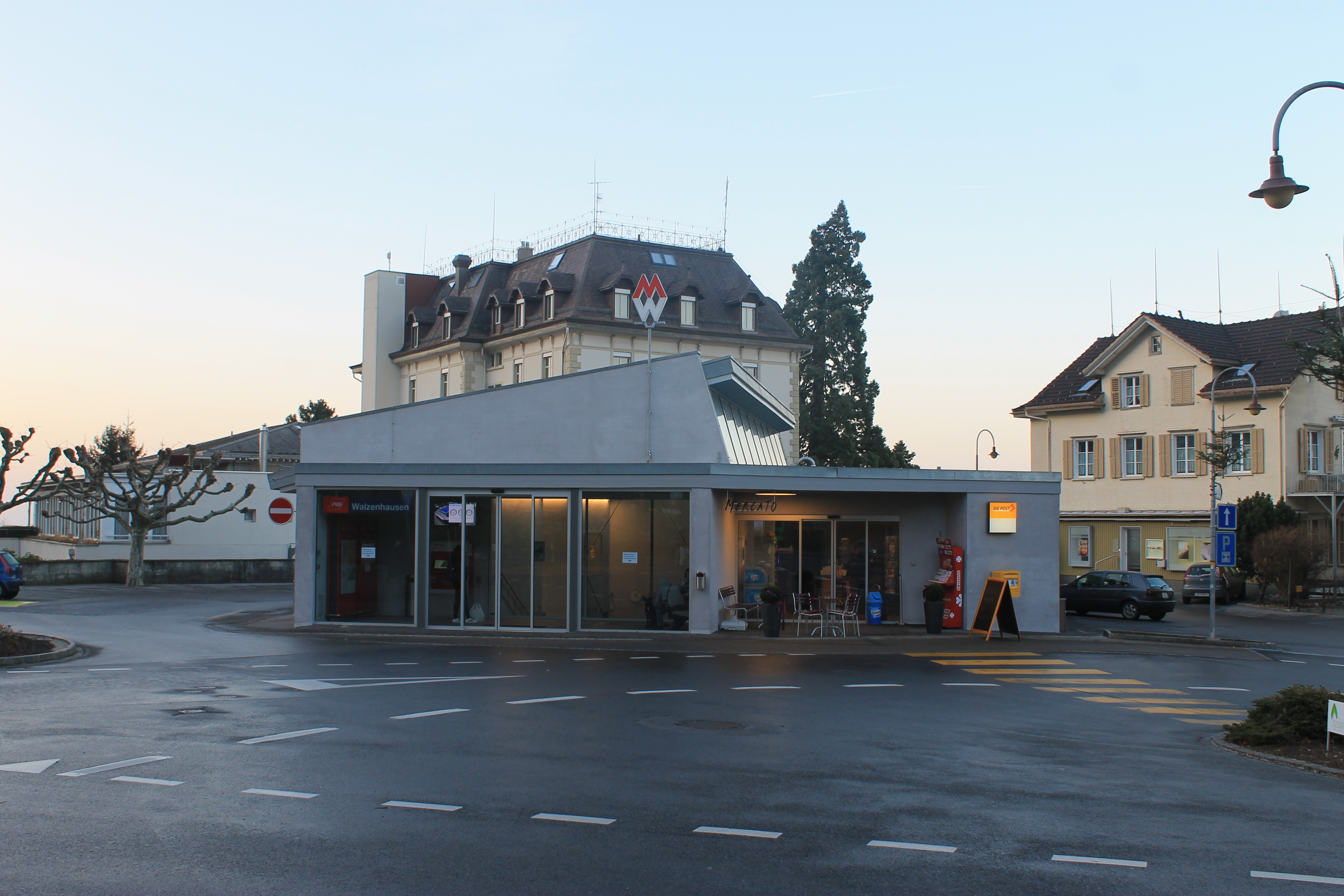
- The station building

General information
- Location: Switzerland
- Coordinates: 47°27′07″N 9°36′04″E
- Elevation: 672 m (2,205 ft)
- Owner: Appenzell Railways
- Line: Rheineck–Walzenhausen mountain railway
- Train operators: Appenzell Railways

Other information
- Fare zone: 240 (Tarifverbund Ostwind)

Services
Preceding station	St. Gallen S-Bahn	Following station
Ruderbach towards Rheineck	S26	Terminus
Location
- Location within Switzerland Location within Canton of Appenzell Ausserrhoden

Walzenhausen railway station (German: Bahnhof Walzenhausen) is a railway station in Walzenhausen, in the Swiss canton of Appenzell Ausserrhoden. It is the upper terminus of the Rheineck–Walzenhausen mountain rack railway line of Appenzell Railways.

== Services ==
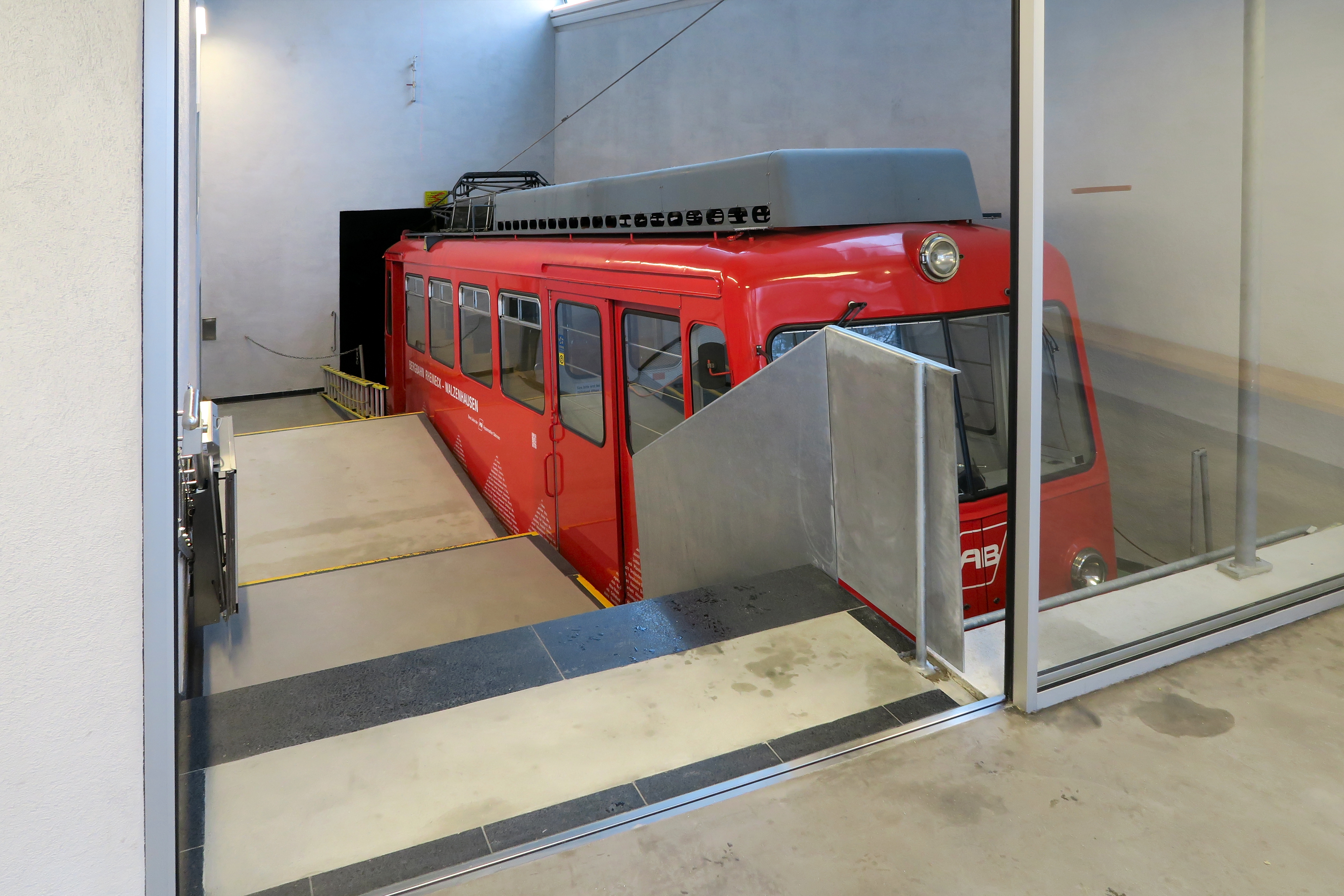
Station interior

As of the December 2023 timetable change, the following services stop at Walzenhausen:

- St. Gallen S-Bahn:
  - S26: hourly service to Rheineck.
