= Thomas Goodrich (historian, born 1947) =

American author and historian (born 1947)

Thomas Goodrich (born Michael Thomas Schoenlein; November 21, 1947 – December 4, 2024) was an American author known for his works on historical topics.

== Life ==
Both his biological father and adoptive father fought in World War II. He wrote extensively on various subjects, including World War II and the American Civil War. He talked publicly at the Lincoln Forum Symposium about the civil unrest caused by the assassination of then president Abraham Lincoln. Due to his niche historical knowledge he was invited to speak at the Civil War Days in Humboldt, Kansas.

In 2005 Thomas and his wife Debra launched a local magazine called the Kansas Journal of Military History which at its peak had 5,000 subscribers. The magazine was released in conjunction with a grassroots effort called Kansas Committee for Reclaiming What is Rightfully Ours (RETAKE) which aimed to raise awareness about the parts of Colorado that used to be Kansas territory.

In 2015 his book Hellstorm was adapted into a documentary film produced by Kyle Hunt of neo-Nazi and white nationalist media platform Renegade Films. The film subsequently won an honorable mention at the 2016 Myrtle Beach Film Festival.

Goodrich died on December 4, 2024.

His wife Debra Goodrich, a freelance journalist, has co-authored several of his books. She is currently the resident historian of the Historic Topeka Cemetery and writes extensively about the history of Kansas.

== Bibliography ==
- Bloody Dawn: The Story of the Lawrence Massacre (1992)
- Scalp Dance: Indian Warfare on the High Plains, 1865-1879 (1997)
- Black Flag: Guerrilla Warfare on the Western Border, 1861–1865 (1999)
- The Day Dixie Died: The Occupied South, 1865-1866 (2001)
- Hellstorm: The Death of Nazi Germany, 1944-1947 (2010)
- War to the Knife: Bleeding Kansas, 1854–1861 (2023)
