= Hellstorm (film) =

2015 documentary film by Kyle Hunt

- Promotional poster
- Directed by: Kyle Hunt
- Screenplay by: Kyle Hunt; Thomas Goodrich
- Based on: Hellstorm by Thomas Goodrich
- Produced by: Kyle Hunt
- Starring: Gerald Ausmeier; John DeNugent; Thomas Goodrich; Paul Hickman; Howard Holt; Margaret Huffsticker; Kyle Hunt; Sven Longshanks
- Edited by: Kyle Hunt; Oscar Turner
- Production company: Renegade
- Distributed by: Renegade
- Release date: 2015
- Running time: 90 minutes
- Country: United States
- Language: English

Hellstorm is a 2015 American neo-Nazi propaganda documentary film directed by American white nationalist Kyle Hunt. The film is based on the 2014 book Hellstorm: The Death Of Nazi Germany, 1944-1947 from author Thomas Goodrich, who co-wrote the film with Hunt. It aims to "expose" Allied war crimes committed against German noncombatants during World War II, albeit under a pro-Nazi Germany point of view which promotes the antisemitic conspiracy theory that Jews victimized the Germans.

== Film content ==
The majority of the documentary covers the Allied bombings of Germany during World War II, most notable Hamburg, Dresden, and Swinemünde. The focus of this coverage is on the number of civilian casualties during the bombing raids. The film has been criticized by the Southern Poverty Law Center (SPLC) for portraying Nazi Germany as the main victim of World War II. It depicts Allied war crimes and claims the Nazis had made Germany a happy and hopeful country. The beginning of the film overviews the state of Germany post WWI and covers the economic state of Germany prior to WWII.

Other historical events covered in the documentary are the sinking of the MV Wilhelm Gustloff, the killing of SS soldiers during the liberation of Dachau, and the designation of surrendered German soldiers as Disarmed Enemy Forces under General Dwight D. Eisenhower.

== Promotion ==
The film has been promoted by United People of America (UPA), an organization associated with the right-wing extremist group Veterans on Patrol, on Instagram.
