= Renegade (media platform) =

American white nationalist, conspiracy theorist and anti-Semitic media platform

- Predecessor: Oracle Broadcasting
- Formation: October 2012; 13 years ago
- Founder: Kyle Hunt
- Type: Internet radio Blogging
- Purpose: Neo-Nazism; White nationalism Antisemitism
- Headquarters: Deltona, Florida, U.S. (current); Woodside, New York, U.S. (previous)
- Key people: Michael McLaughlin
- Secessions: Might Is Right Network
- Website: www.renegadebroadcasting.com

Renegade is an American white nationalist and antisemitic media platform, based in Deltona, Florida. The project consists of two main outlets; Renegade Broadcasting, an internet radio network founded in October 2012 and Renegade Tribune, founded in 2013.

Renegade has promoted White Nationalism, antisemitism and conspiracy based content. The Jerusalem Post described the Renegade Tribune as "a well-known white separatist, Holocaust denying, historical revisionist, neo-Nazi website established in 2012 by Kyle Hunt." The Anti-Defamation League described it as "an antisemitic, conspiratorial and white nationalist publication" and Hunt as a White supremacist. In 2014, Hunt promoted "the White Man March".

Renegade has criticized Donald Trump and Vladimir Putin. It claims that both homosexuality and misogyny are rife within the alt-right and alt-lite. Renegade has also covered such topics as 9/11 conspiracy theories, Pizzagate and flat earth theories. Notable contributors include Michael McLaughlin, former leader of the British Movement.

== History ==
Renegade was founded by Kyle Christopher Hunt of Massachusetts. Hunt is a former Google employee. Hunt's Star Theory radio show began to be carried by the Oracle Broadcasting network in April 2012. This network covered antisemitic conspiracy theories and the white genocide conspiracy theory, as well as historical revisionism about the Third Reich (although it ridiculed American neo-Nazism by calling it controlled opposition).

Also in October 2012, Hunt began the internet radio network Renegade Broadcasting. In 2013, this outlet expanded with the website Renegade Tribune.

Hunt has directed the film Hellstorm, a pro-Nazi Germany film based on the book of the same name by author Thomas Goodrich. The film falsely portrays Germany as the main victim of World War II.

=== White Man March ===
In March 2014, Hunt and Renegade promoted the idea of a "White Man March", where autonomous groups of white people were encouraged to go out in public places on that day with placards and leaflets bearing phrases such as "Diversity = White Genocide", at undisclosed locations. At the time of the march, Hunt said he was a supporter of William Daniel Johnson's white supremacist American Freedom Party. Hunt planned to hold the event in New York City, where he lived at the time. He encouraged people to dress in "a pair of light khakis and a nice dress shirt" as part of their public relations. According to David Neiwert of the Southern Poverty Law Center, the event attracted negligible numbers of people, but had gatherings in New York City, Florence, Kentucky, Tempe, Arizona, Birmingham, Alabama, Branson, Missouri and Olympia, Washington. According to Neiwert, the autonomous march in Kentucky, organized by former National Alliance leader Robert Ransdell, was subject to particular derision due to the presence of two unidentified individuals in Ku Klux Klan uniforms. Hunt had planned to advocate these kind of events monthly, but changed his mind in April 2014.
