= Bernhard Schaub =

Swiss holocaust denier

- Born: 1954 (age 70–71); Bern, Switzerland
- Occupation(s): Activist, writer

Bernhard Schaub (born 1954) is a Swiss holocaust denier and a far-right activist. He works in Switzerland and Germany. He gained publicity, particularly in Switzerland, due to his book "Adler und Rose" (1992, self-published).

== Professional career ==
Bernhard Schaub was born in Bern. He was a teacher at a Waldorf school (a type of school based on Rudolf Steiner's Waldorf pedagogy) in Adliswil, but was fired in January 1993, after his above-mentioned book received publicity and therefore his ideology was unveiled.

Afterwards he worked for the Klubschule in Frauenfeld until 1999 as a "pädagogischer Mitarbeiter" (pedagogic collaborator). He was sacked after a lecture in Munich that took place on 15 June 1998 (quote: "Europa ist die Heimat der weißen Rasse" – "Europe is the home of the white race") Since then he has been a speaker at events, both domestically and internationally, in the far-right extremist scene (e.g. Germany's NPD party).

== Activities ==
March 1994: Foundation of the "Arbeitsgemeinschaft zur Enttabuisierung der Zeitgeschichte" (AEZ) – "Work community to free history from taboos". Later the group was renamed "Arbeitsgemeinschaft zur Erforschung der Zeitgeschichte" (work community for the exploration of history). The founders were four former teachers: Arthur Vogt, Andreas Studer, Jürgen Graf, and Schaub. The related magazine "Aurora", which ran to 13 editions between 1994 and 1997 (print runs up to 200 copies), was predominantly written by Schaub. Furthermore, the group tried to spread Holocaust-denying ideology in Switzerland. They sent out – according to their own statements – propaganda to 6000 political and university addresses ("Zurück ins Mittelalter?" – "Back to the Middle Ages?"). For the same purposes a professionally printed brochure, which denied the existence of gas chambers in Auschwitz, was also distributed ("Das Rudolf-Gutachten" – "The Rudolf Report").

Bernhard Schaub collaborated with the far-right "Partei National Orientierter Schweizer" (Party of Nationally Oriented Swiss Citizens) (PNOS), which included a violent faction among its members. He wrote the party manifesto and also contributed columns for the party’s paper "Zeitgeist". After his apparently voluntary exit from the party, he founded the "Nationale Außerparlamentarische Opposition" (National Extra-parliamentary Opposition) (NAPO) in Switzerland, which describes itself as a "Sammelbewegung für den echten nationalen Widerstand in der Schweiz" ("collective movement for genuine national resistance in Switzerland").

Schaub is president of the Verein zur Rehabilitierung der wegen Bestreitens des Holocaust Verfolgten (VRBHV – Organisation for the rehabilitation of people persecuted for denying Holocaust), which was founded by notable Holocaust deniers including Horst Mahler, Manfred Roeder and Ernst Zündel.

He participated in the Holocaust Conference in Tehran in 2006.

== Publications ==
- Die Aufsicht des Bundes über die Kantone. Zürcher Beiträge zur Rechtswissenschaft, N.F. H. 206, Sauerländer-Verlag, Aarau 1957 (Dissertation)
- Das Feuer der Freiheit. Eine eidgenössische Denk- und Kampfschrift gegen die EG. Konradin-Verlag, Brugg im Aargau 1992
- Adler und Rose. Wesen und Schicksal des deutschsprachigen Mitteleuropa. Konradin-Verlag, Brugg im Aargau 1992
- Reich Europa. Manifest der Reichsbewegung Verlag Zeitenwende, Dresden 1999
- Ausbruch aus den Ideologien. Verlag Zeitenwende, Dresden 2001 (with Andreas Ferch, Markus Fernbach)
- Volksstaat der Zukunft.
- Schweizer Geschichte.

== Sources ==
Much of this article is translated from the German wikipedia article of 21 February 2007.
