= Chur–Rorschach railway line =

Railway line in Switzerland

Chur–Rorschach
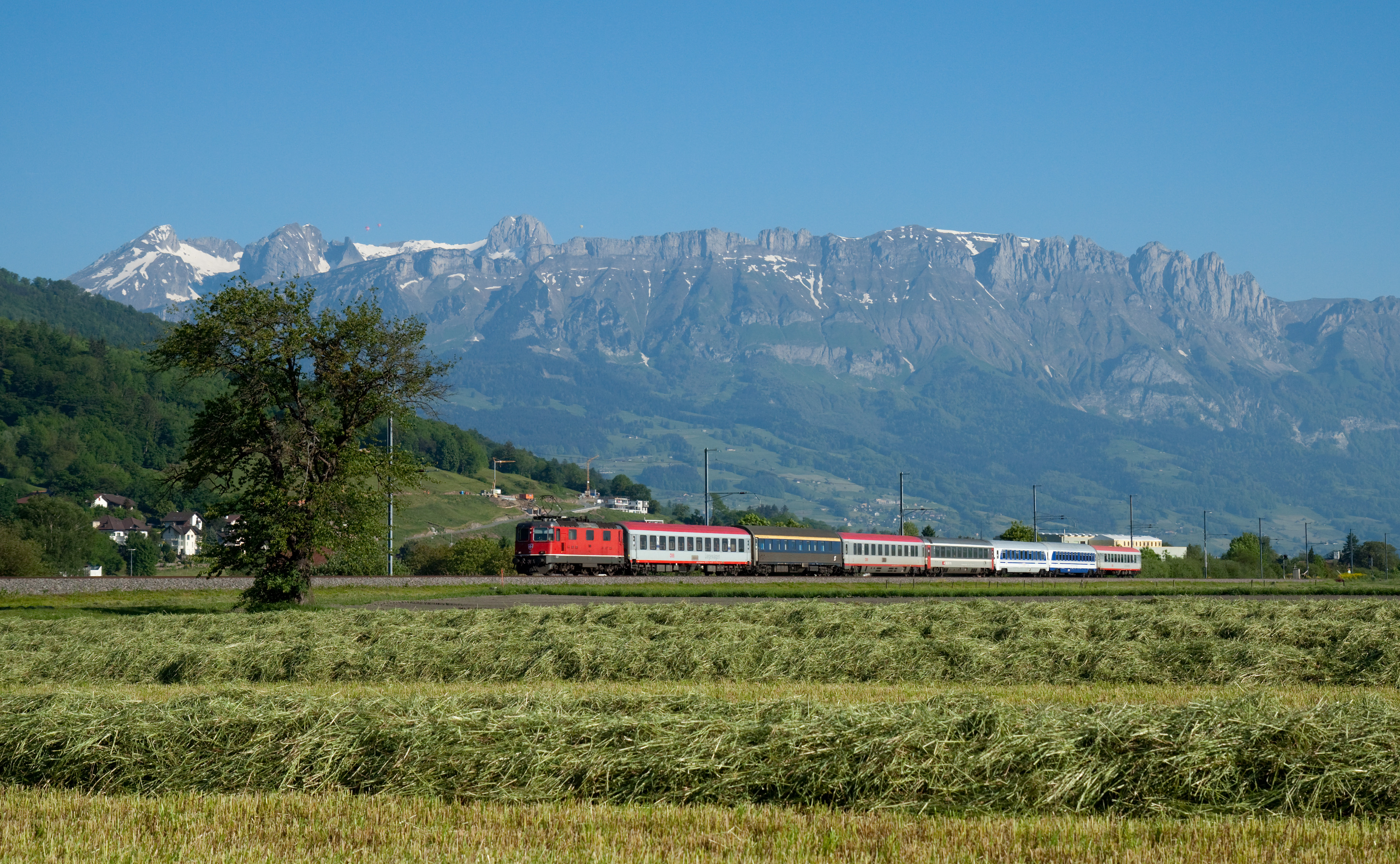
- EuroNight Zürichsee between Buchs and Sevelen with Alpstein and the Kreuzberges behind

Overview
- Native name: Rheintallinie
- Line number: 880
- Locale: Switzerland
- Termini: Rorschach; Chur

Technical
- Line length: 90.75 km (56.39 mi)
- Track gauge: 1,435 mm (4 ft 8 1/2 in)
- Electrification: 15 kV/16.7 Hz AC overhead catenary
- Operating speed: 130 km/h (81 mph)
- Maximum incline: 2.0%

The Chur–Rorschach railway line, also called the Rhine Valley line (German: Rheintallinie), is a standard gauge railway line in Switzerland. It belongs to the Swiss Federal Railways (SBB) and is located in the cantons of St. Gallen and the Grisons.

== History ==
=== 19th century ===
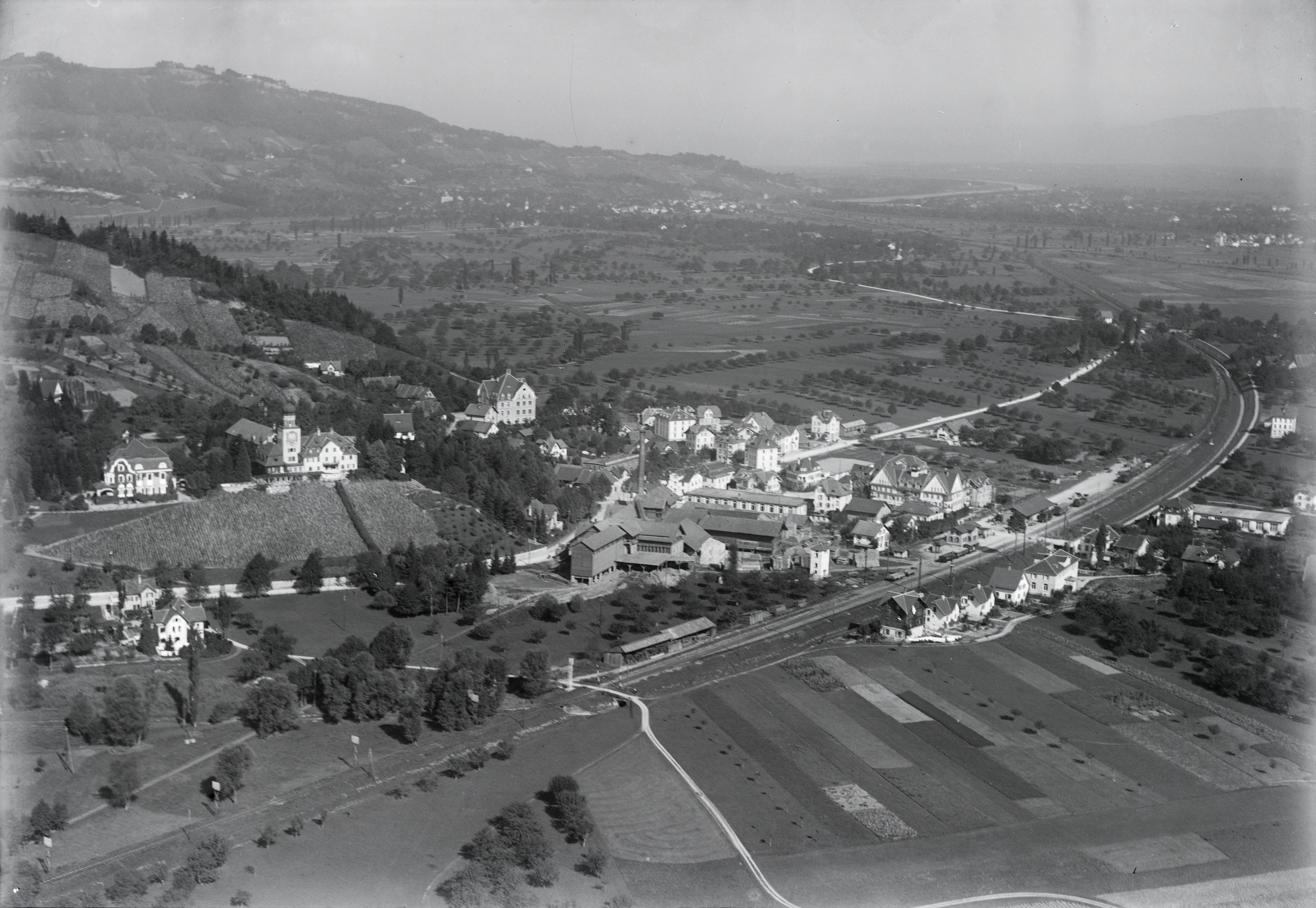
Photograph from 1923 with station (right) and Heerbrugg palace (left)

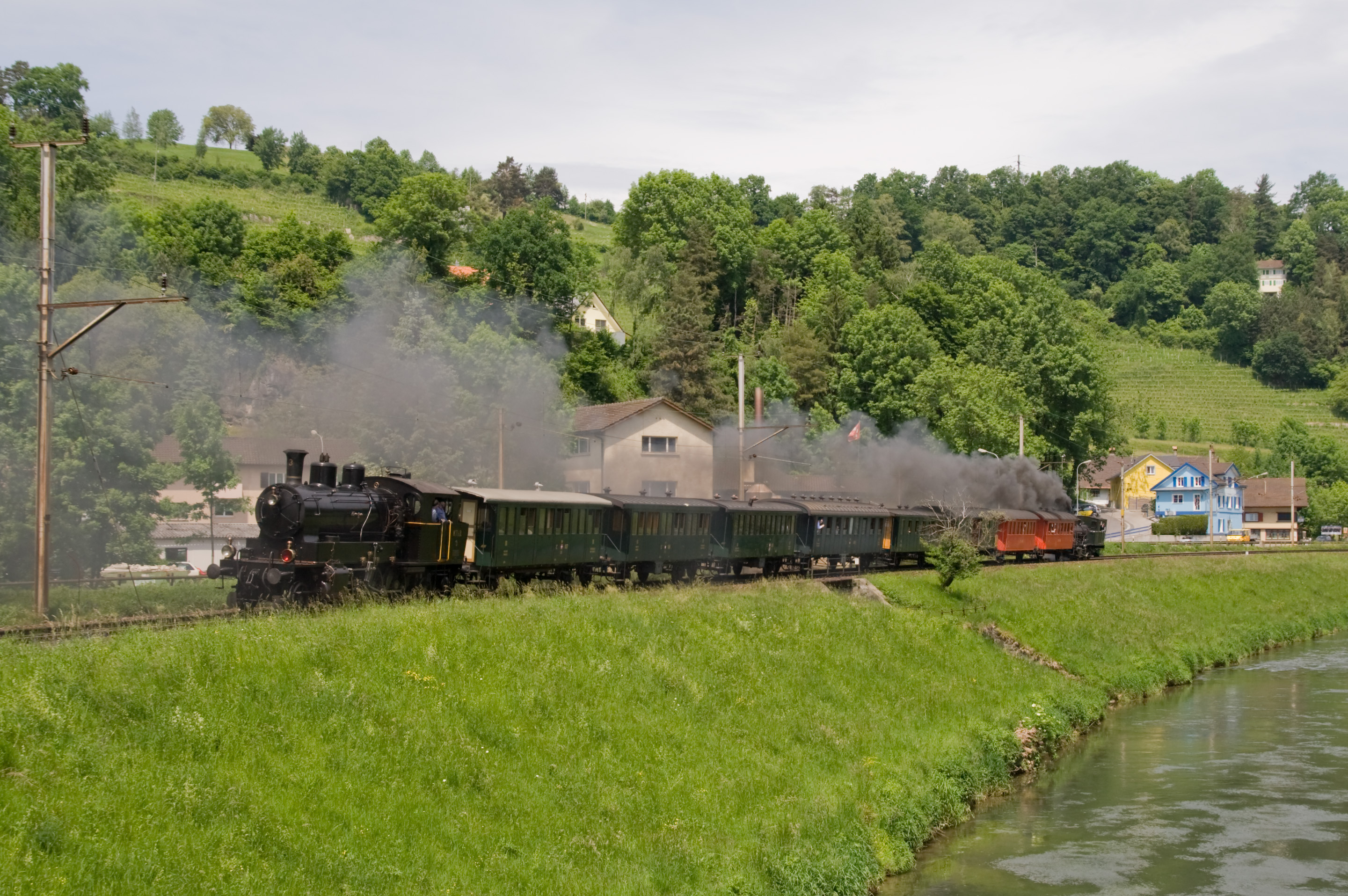
Steam trains at the 150th anniversary of the Rhine line with Ec 3/5 and E 3/3 between Au and St. Margrethen

The construction of the Rhine valley line was started by the Southeastern Railway (Schweizerische Südostbahn), which sought to build a railway through the Lukmanier Pass. The first work, which was carried out by English contractors, was unsatisfactory. Due to a lack of financial resources, the Southeastern Railway was taken over during the construction by the United Swiss Railways (Vereinigte Schweizerbahnen, VSB), which continued the work without interruption.

The VSB opened the section from Rorschach to Rheineck on 25 August 1857 and the section from Rheineck to Chur on 1 July 1858. Sargans station was opened as a junction station with the station building between the diverging lines along with the section of the Ziegelbrücke–Sargans railway to Murg on 15 February 1859. In the same year, the VSB took over the continuous operation of the line via Ziegelbrücke and Rapperswil to Zürich. Since then, the section between Sargans and Chur has served traffic from both Zürich and St. Gallen.

The Rhine Valley line would have become a lucrative access route if an eastern Alpine railway crossing had been built.

=== 20th century ===
The VSB was nationalised with a route length of 269 kilometres on 1 July 1902 and its routes have since belonged to the Swiss Federal Railways (SBB).

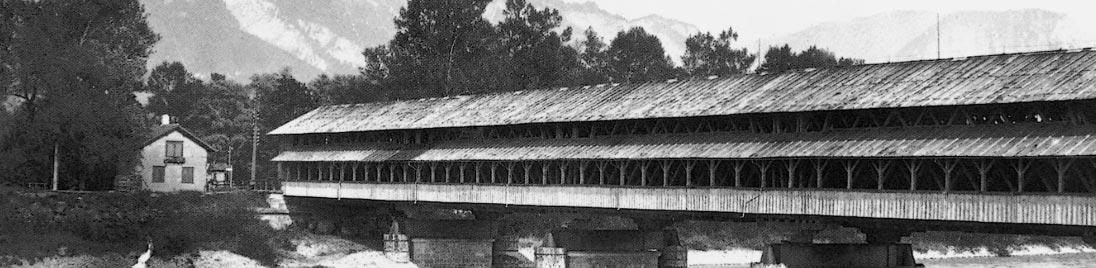
Timber Rhine bridge at Ragaz

Until 1928, the railway line between Maienfeld and Bad Ragaz crossed the Rhine with a covered timber bridge, it was the last of its kind in the Swiss railway network.

The Sargans–Buchs was electrified at 15 kV 16 2/3 Hz on 15 December 1927 as part of the ongoing electrification program of the SBB. About six months later, on 11 May 1928, electric operations started on the Sargans–Chur section. The section from St. Margrethen to Rorschach was electrified on 15 May 1934 and the last section from Buchs to St. Margrethen was wired on 21 September 1934.

A second track was put into operation between St. Margrethen and Rheineck on 1 December 1920. The Staad–Rorschach section was duplicated on 15 May 1930 and the Rheineck–Staad section on 12 August 1930. The line between Sargans and Bad Ragaz has been duplicated since 20 December 1957. The line between Landquart and Chur was duplicated between 15 December 1970 and 10 April 1973. The line from Weite-Wartau to Trübbach was duplicated on 17 September 1982.

A new 5.3 kilometre-long loop between Sargans and Trübbach was opened together with the partial commissioning of a new signalling system in Sargans station on 29 May 1983. This connecting loop was constructed for freight traffic and allows trains to avoid reversing in Sargans. However, it is also used by services on line 4 of the St. Gallen S-Bahn, Transalpin services and, subsequently, Railjet services.

The Rossriet–Landquart sections was duplicated on 6 June 1993 and the Bad Ragaz–Rossriet was duplicated on 8 November 1994. Since then, duplication of the line between Sargans and Chur has been completed. The line between St. Margrethen and Buchs is still single-track.

=== 21st century ===
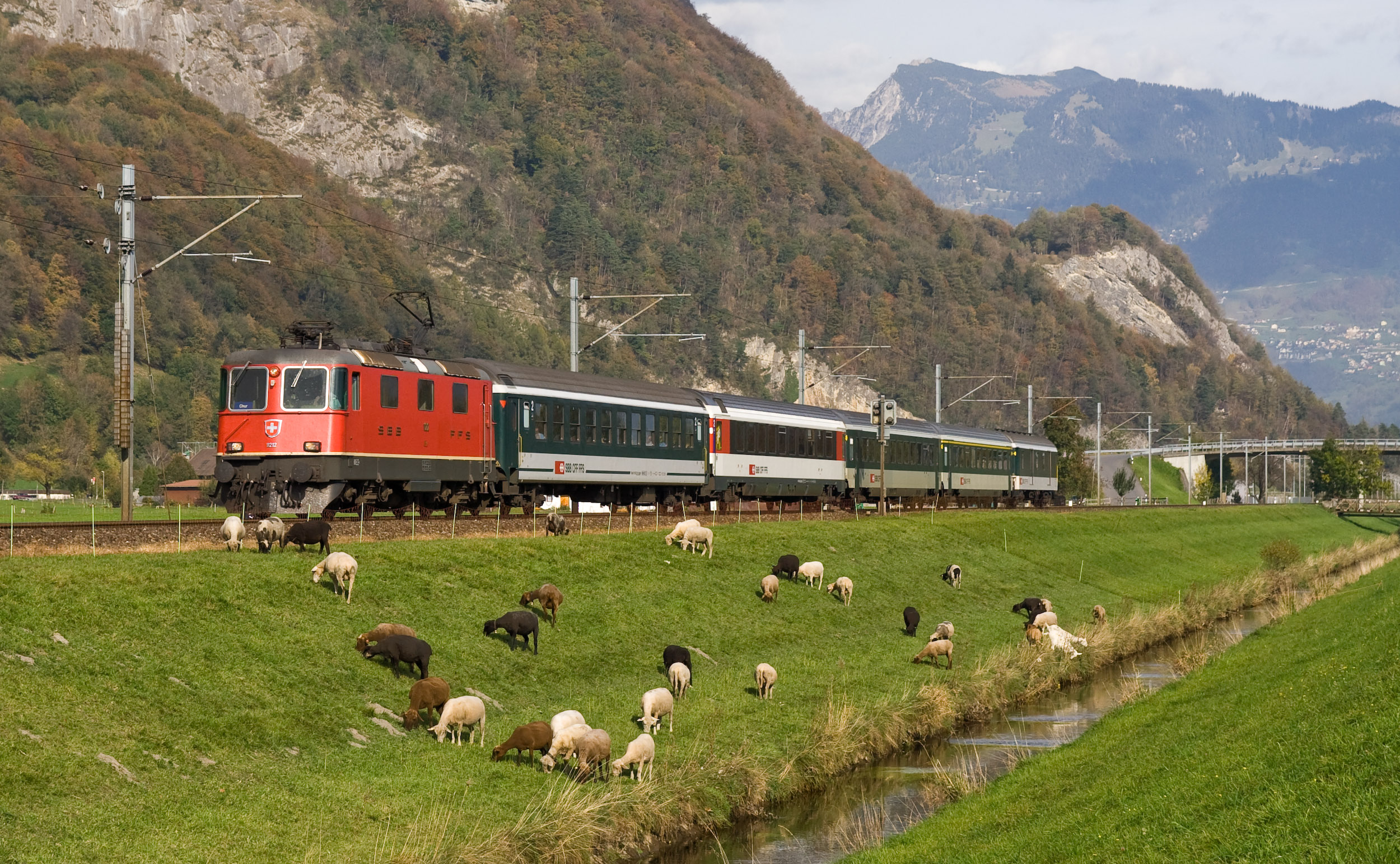
Rheintal-Express between Trübbach and Sargans

At the 2013 timetable change, the range of InterRegio and Regional services were comprehensively expanded and the lines of the St. Gallen S-Bahn were completely rearranged. Since then, the St Gallen and Sargans junctions have formed the basis for the S-Bahn timetable, which offers half-hourly services on virtually all lines, with extras services in the core area. Infrastructure upgrades were necessary to make the new timetable possible. The travel time of the Rheintal-Express (REX) was shortened by ten minutes to just under an hour, so that better connections could be offered in Sargans and Chur. This required an acceleration of the Rheintal-Express, an increase in running speeds on the section to 160 km/h and the dropping of intermediate stops. In addition to the stop in St. Gallen St. Fiden there are also stops in Rheineck and Bad Ragaz. Three stations were closed between Buchs SG and Sargans: Räfis-Burgerau, Weite, and Trübbach.

== Route description ==
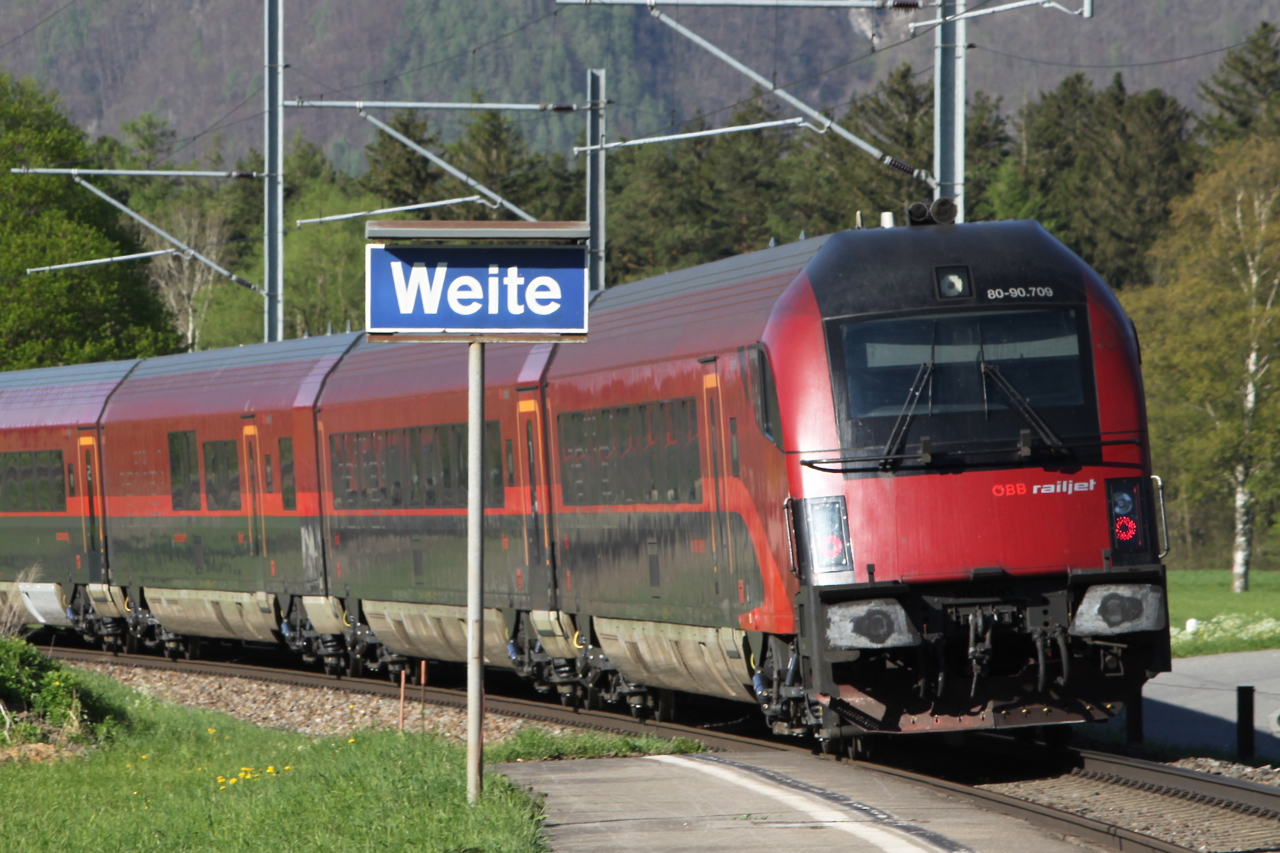
Railjet passing through the then station of Weite

The Chur–Rorschach line is an important rail link in the canton of St. Gallen. It runs through the Chur and St. Gallen sections of the Rhine valleys from Chur to Rheineck and on to Rorschach.

The Rhine valley line begins in Chur railway station, where the standard gauge line connects with the dual gauge Domat/Ems–Chur line of the Rhaetian Railway (RhB). The route initially runs parallel to the Chur–Landquart line of the RhB north to Haldenstein, from where the two lines run to Zizers between the Rhine and the A13 motorway. From Zizers, the SBB line runs directly to Landquart, where it again meets the RhB line to Davos, which has detoured via Igis. Between Maienfeld and Bad Ragaz, the Rhine valley line crosses the A13 and the Rhine, which at this point forms the canton border between the Grisons and St. Gallen. The section to Maienfeld is the only standard gauge line in the Grisons. From Bad Ragaz the trains run parallel to the A13 to Sargans station, where the line splits to Zürich and St. Gallen.

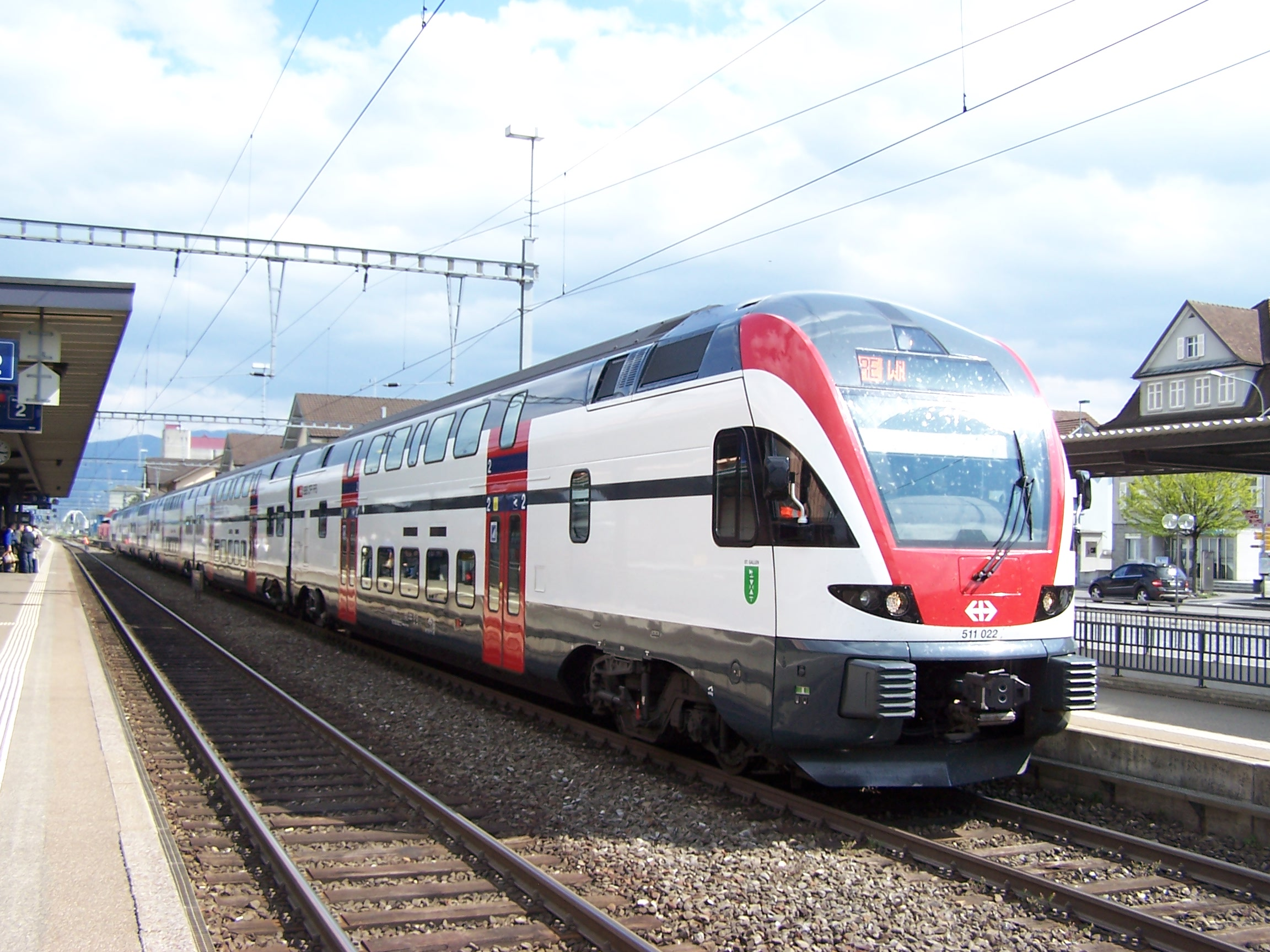
Stadler KISS (class RABe 511) running as the Rheintal-Express Chur–Wil at a stop in St. Margrethen.

Sargans, the starting point for the measurement of the line-kilometrage (chainage), follows a junction with the Sargans loop (Sargans Schleife), which allows trains coming from Ziegelbrücke to proceed to Trübbach next to the A13, avoiding the need to reverse in Sargans. A short double track section between Trübbach and Neugrüt allows train crossings, otherwise the line to St. Margrethen is single-track. It no longer runs along the A13 and the Rhine, but has its own route between the motorway and the valley slope. In Buchs, the Rhine valley line meets the line from Feldkirch of the Austrian Federal Railways (ÖBB). Trains coming from Sargans and continuing over the Arlberg Railway have to reverse in Buchs, which in the case of freight trains, requires a locomotive change.

From Buchs to Oberriet the Rhine valley line more or less follows the Werdenberger and Rheintaler canals and main road 13 as far as Altstätten. The Altstätten–Gais railway of the Appenzell Railways (AB) has ended in Altstätten Stadt since 1975. Since then the connection between the two Altstätt stations has been provided by a short bus line operated by the Rheintalische Verkehrsbetriebe (Rhine Valley Transport Company). The Rhine Valley line runs directly to Au and meets and runs along the inland canal and the St. Margrethen motorway, where it connects with the Bregenz line of the ÖBB. As the SBB and ÖBB have the same electrical system, there is often no change in traction for international trains in St. Margrethen. The EuroCity services running from Zürich via St. Gallen to Munich are hauled to Lindau by class Re 421 locomotives registered in Germany and Austria. DB Cargo operates its freight trains on the Kornwestheim–Rorschach–Wolfurt route with its own Swiss-made TRAXX (class 185) locomotives.

From St. Margrethen to Rheineck, the now double-track line follows the A1 and the Alter Rhein (old Rhine). In Rheineck, the Rheineck–Walzenhausen mountain railway of the AB connects to the Vorderland mountain resort. The Rhine valley line runs to Staad and along the shore of Lake Constance to Rorschach, where SBB services continue on the line to St. Gallen or the line to Romanshorn and AB services run on the line to Heiden.

== Operations ==
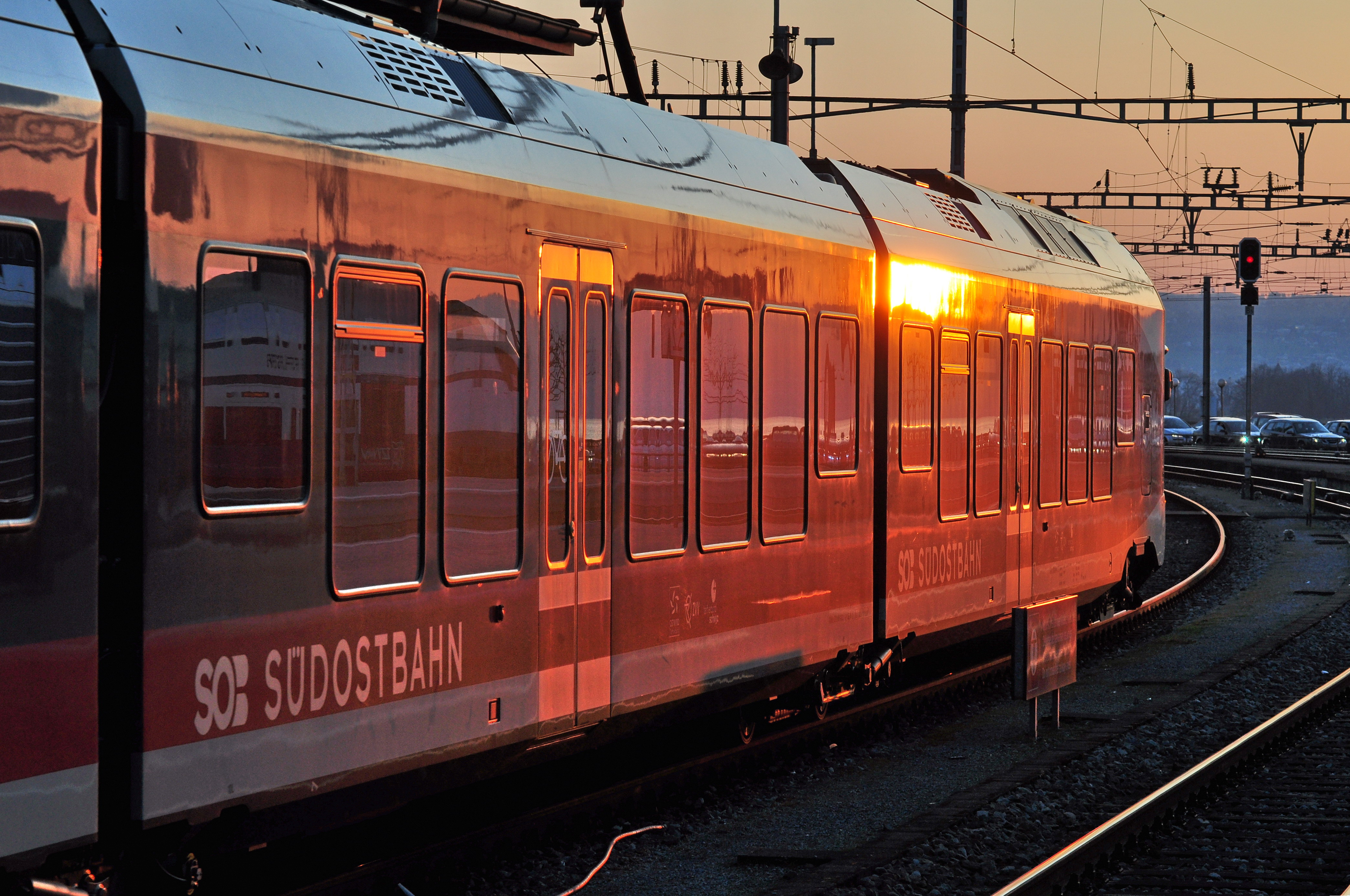
Stadler FLIRT sets of the Südostbahn are operated on the circular line S4

Since 13 December 2009, two of the three daily EuroCitys to and from Austria have been replaced by Railjet services. This saves a total of 40 minutes running time between Zürich and Vienna, due, among other things, to having faster turnarounds in Buchs. The third train, the former Transalpin service, was also replaced by a Railjet service in June 2010, but, unlike the first two, runs as two coupled sets. Nine day and night trains a day connect Zürich with Austria, all with stops in Sargans and Buchs. The section from Rorschach to St. Margrethen is served four times a day by a EuroCity service on the Zürich–Munich route.

Rheintal Express (REX) services now run between Chur and St. Gallen every hour. Between Sargans and Rorschach, line S4 St Gallen S-Bahn services operated by Südostbahn also run every hour on a circular route with stops at all stations. Between Altstätten and St. Gallen the line is served by lines S1 and S2 of the S-Bahn. Overall, this results in two trains per hour between St. Gallen and Altstätten and three between Heerbrugg and St. Gallen. On the Sargans–Chur section the good connections from Zürich on two InterCity services and a RegioExpress are supplemented by the S12 (Sargans–Chur) service.

=== Freight traffic ===
Freight traffic is heavy between Sargans and Buchs, because this is the transit route to the Vorarlberg and to the rest of Austria. The trains from France (Mulhouse) and the Limmattal marshalling yard (west of Zürich) to the Hall in Tirol marshalling yard use the route through the Buchs border crossing. The crossing at St. Margrethen is only used by trains to and from the Wolfurt marshalling yard. The Buchs marshalling yard serves the whole Swiss Rhine valley.

Since 2004 DB Cargo has been operating freight trains from Stuttgart Kornwestheim via the electrified Lake Line and then via Rorschach and St. Margrethen to the Wolfurt marshalling yard to avoid the use of diesel locomotives on the Lake Constance Belt Railway and the Ulm–Friedrichshafen railway.
