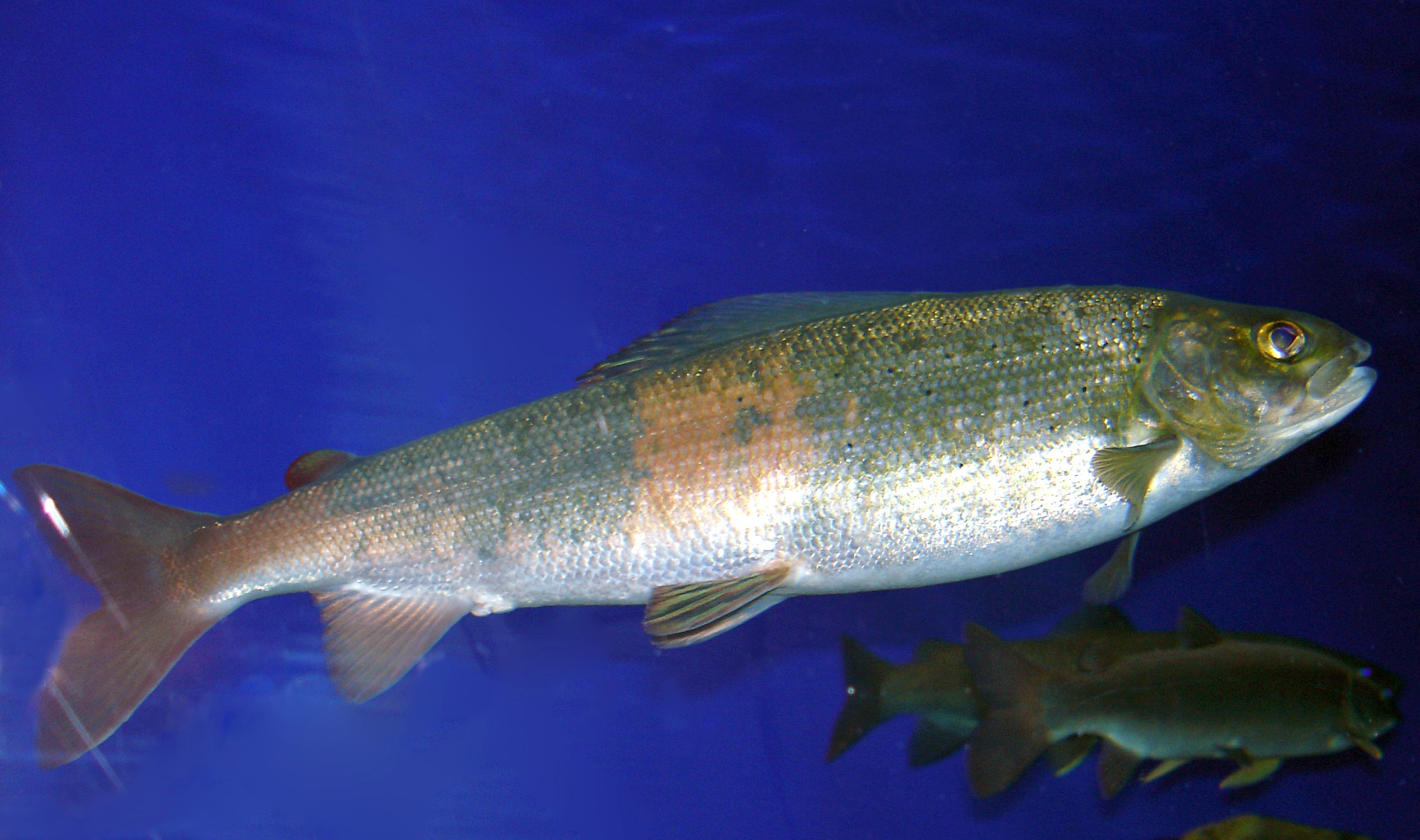

Scientific classification
- Kingdom: Animalia
- Phylum: Chordata
- Class: Actinopterygii
- Order: Salmoniformes
- Family: Salmonidae
- Genus: Thymallus
- Species: T. baicalensis

Binomial name
- Thymallus baicalensis Dybowski, 1874

= Thymallus baicalensis =

Species of fish

Thymallus baicalensis, also known as the Baikal black grayling, is a Siberian freshwater fish species in the salmon family Salmonidae. It can grow up to a length of 38 cm and a weight of 1.2 kg. The species occurs in Lake Baikal, in the inflowing Selenga River and throughout the major Enisei River drainage, and also some eastern tributaries of the Ob River, and mainly feeds on invertebrates and fish eggs on stony bottoms at shallow depths.

== Taxononmy ==
The Baikal black grayling is a member of the Thymallinae subfamily in the family Salmonidae. The species was previously considered a subspecies of the Arctic grayling, but is currently treated as one of several distinct Siberian and East Asian grayling species, the closest of which are Thymallus nikolskyi, T. svetovidovi, T. brevicephalus and T. brevirostris.

== Description ==
The species can grow to a length of 38 cm and a weight of 1.2 kg. The mouth is small and forward-facing with teeth well suited for predation of small animal prey. Like all graylings, it has a large dorsal fin with a dark olive color on the lower half. Rows of brick-red and green spots are visible over the lower half of the dorsal fin. The upper half is a gray-greenish color with several rows of dark-red and purple spots. The top of the dorsal fin is crested with a dark-red fringe along the upper margin. The body features larger cycloid scales on the middle of their body and caudal fins being a dark olive color with a slight bluish tint. Large copper-red lateral spots and splotches are present above the ventral and behind the anal fins. Pectoral and ventral fins are yellow, and the caudal fin is crimson with olive-colored bands. The adipose fin is a dark crimson color. Females of the genus are smaller than males and feature a silver coloration with a reddish hue on the caudal, anal, and adipose fins. Distinct riverine and lacustrine morphologies have been reported, with the latter presenting as more rounded and larger, presumably an adadptation to a slow-flowing and more expansive habitat.

== Distribution and habitat ==
The Baikal black grayling lives primarily on the rocky bottoms of shallow sections of lakes, rivers, and streams. It inhabits Lake Baikal, its streams and its drainage basin, the inflowing Selenga and Angara rivers, and the Yenisei River drainage and the eastern tributaries of the Ob River. It is also found in northern Mongolia in Lake Hovsgol and its tributaries, together with the Hovsgol grayling.. The species prefers clean waters at low temperatures.

In 1959 the species was introduced into the Dobšiná River in former Czechoslovakia. Some 2,500 juveniles were estimated to be released. In 1961 the first of the introduced juveniles were caught. From 1962 to 1975 fisherman reported that spawning migrations of grayling were seen regularly during this time frame. By the end of 1975, the species had entirely disappeared from its introduced range due to overfishing. While other introductions were attempted, the species has not established itself elsewhere in Europe.

== Ecology ==
The species feeds on benthic larvae of invertebrates including caddisflies and stoneflies, amphipods, and the eggs of fish species including sculpin and lenok. Diet does not vary between different life stages. Like other species in the genus, the Baikal black gryling requires cold and well-oxygenated water. It is highly sensitive to pollution and hase been used as an indicator species to determine overall ecosystem health. Baikal black graylings in Lake Baikal and Lake Hovsgol spend the majority of their adult lives in the lake shallows. While spawning, they swim up tributaries to lay their eggs in the soft streambed silt, burying their eggs slightly in a thin layer of sediment. As is common among salmonids, the species does not guard its brood.

== Human interactions ==
The Baikal black grayling has a favorable texture and taste and is widely considered a valuable food and game fish. The species is featured on old Russian postage stamps.

== Conservation ==
Currently all species within the genus Thymallus are experiencing population declines. Baikal black grayling populations are considered to be in decline due to decreasing water quality, the building of infrastructure such as dams, and pressures from fishing industries in and around their habitat. Dams that are built along rivers and tributaries limit the movement of graylings during feeding and spawning, isolating populations from each other, and restrict favorable feeding grounds by raising levels above the dam and reducing nutrient flow downstream of the dam. Despite the estimated population declines, Baikal black graylings are found in numerous pristine lakes, streams, and large rivers.
