= United Swiss Railways =

Overview
- Native name: Vereinigte Schweizerbahnen

History
- Opened: 1 May 1857
- Closed: 1 July 1902

Technical
- Track gauge: 1,435 mm (4 ft 8 1/2 in) standard gauge
Route map
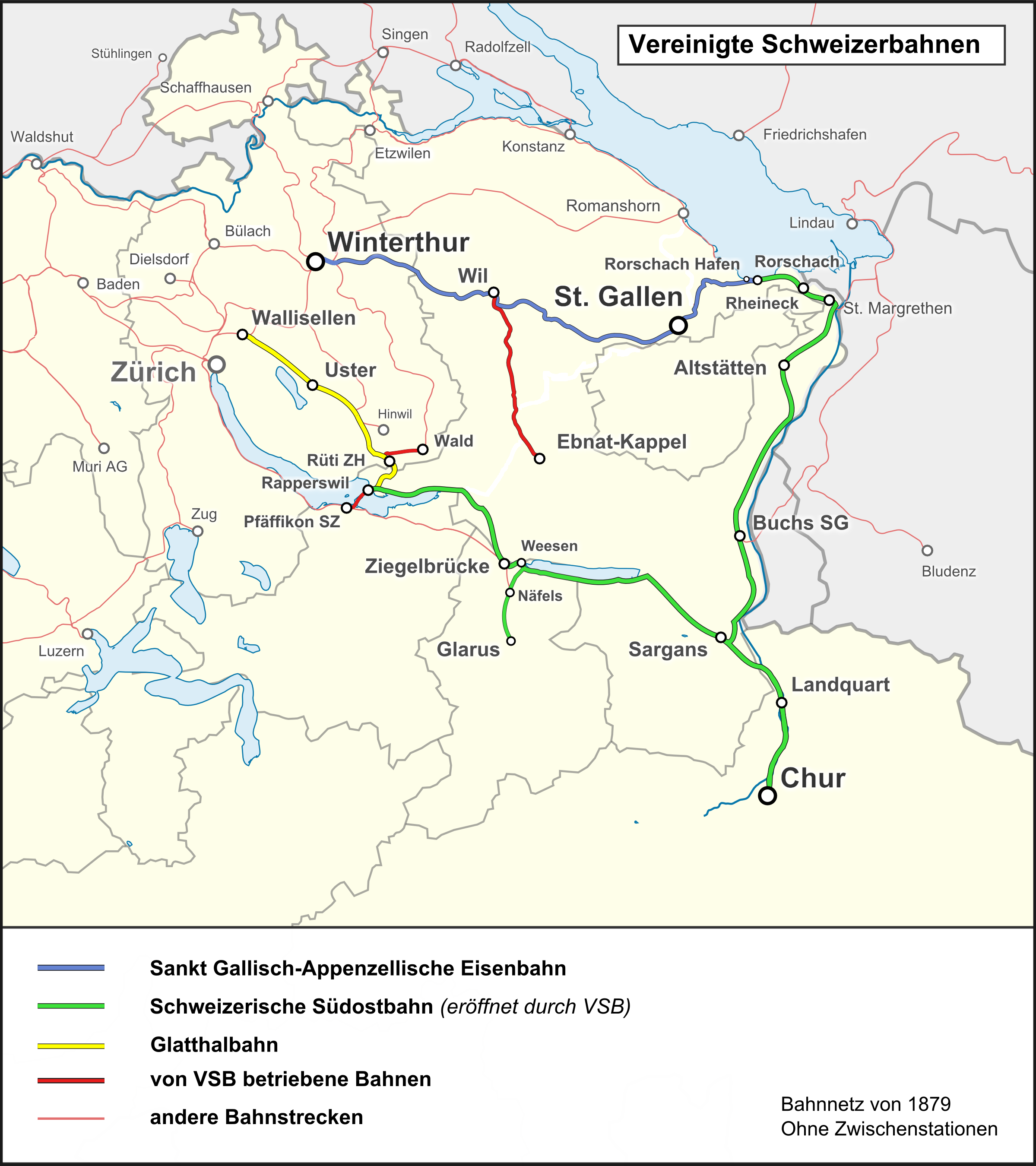

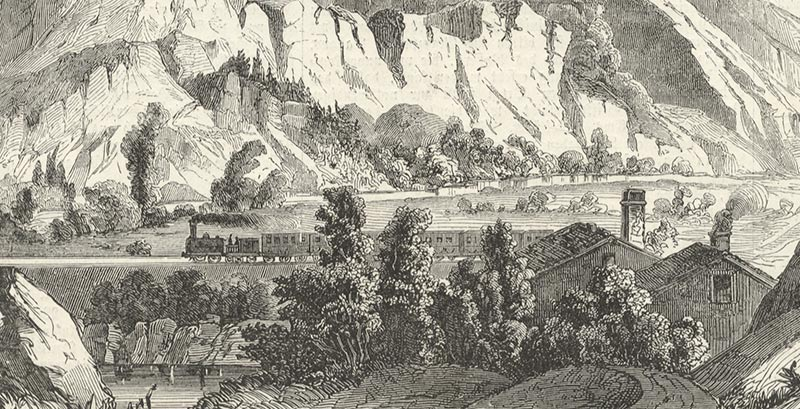
Train of the United Swiss Railways at Sargans. Detail from a wood engraving, 1858

The United Swiss Railways (Vereinigten Schweizerbahnen; VSB or V.S.B.) was a former railway company in Switzerland. It was the smallest of the five main railways that were nationalised from 1902 to form the Swiss Federal Railways.

== Foundation and financing ==
The United Swiss Railways were established on 1 May 1857 by the merger of three railway companies, all of which were in financial difficulties:

- The Sankt Gallisch-Appenzellische Eisenbahn (St. Gallen-Appenzell Railway; SGAE) opened the Winterthur–Wil–St. Gallen–Rorschach railway between 15 October 1855 and 25 October 1856. The construction of the line required the building a number of important bridges. The final sections planned lacked funding.
- The Schweizerische Südostbahn (Swiss Southeast Railways, SOB)—not to be confused with the current Südostbahn—sought to build a railway under the Lukmanier pass that had been proposed by the engineer Richard La Nicca as early as 1839. The company was founded on 1 September 1853 with a share capital of Swiss Francs (CHF) 25 million. The capital came from the cantons of St. Gallen and Grisons and above all from English banks. The beginning of the construction work carried out by English entrepreneurs was unsatisfactory. Senior engineer Pickering was dismissed without notice. Due to financial difficulties, the construction of the Rorschach–St. Margrethen–Sargans–Chur, Sargans–Weesen–Ziegelbrücke–Rapperswil and Weesen–Glarus faltered. The Walensee section required the construction of many tunnels. The lines of the Südostbahn would have become lucrative access routes had an eastern Alpine railway ever been built.
- The Glatthalbahn (Gl-TB) opened the Wallisellen–Uster line on 1 August 1856. There were no funds, however, for the continuation of the line to Rapperswil.

One of the reasons for the VSB's initial financial problems was that the projected construction costs were far too low, leading to an additional capital requirement of around CHF 20 million. The additional capital was provided by a French financier. The Parisian banker, Isaac Péreire of Crédit Mobilier envisaged an eastern alpine crossing linking the French railway companies of the Chemins de fer du Midi, Chemins de fer de l'Ouest and Chemins de fer de l'Est with railway it had partly funded in the Balkans.

== Further development ==
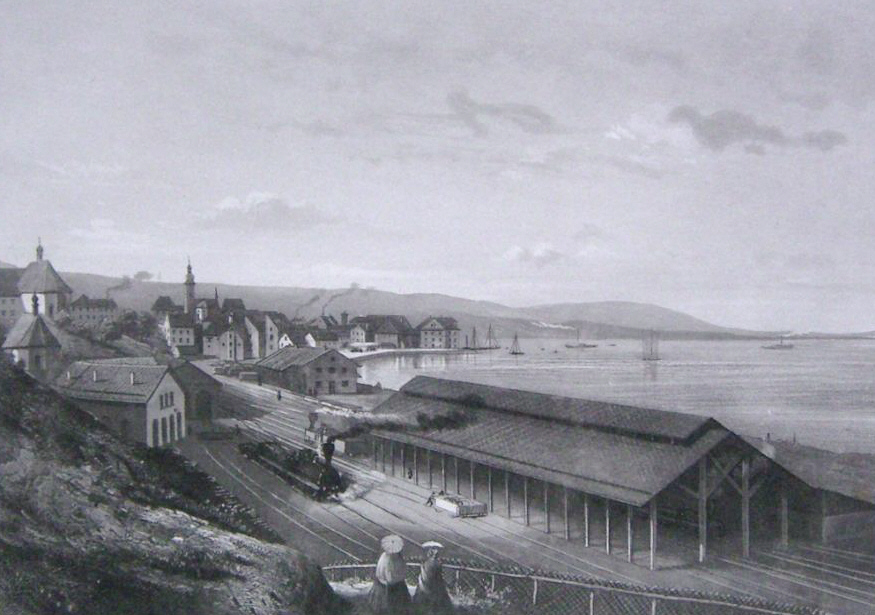
Rorschach station, with town behind

Until the 1890s, the VSB supported a projected railway under the Splügen Pass, which, however, could not be built because of a lack of funds. Eventually the VSB succeeded in establishing the right to use an important connection to Zürich over the Wallisellen–Zürich line of the Swiss Northeastern Railway (NOB).

Since the idea of building an eastern Alpine railway from Chur towards Italy ended with the start of construction of the Gotthard Railway, the Rhine Valley Railway from Rorschach to Chur remained a regional line. Over time, Rorschach was displaced as the leading port town on the Swiss shore of Lake Constance by Romanshorn. The NOB expanded its harbour in Romanshorn and put its own steamboats into operation. In 1869, the NOB opened the Lake Line from Rorschach to Romanshorn, where the line of the NOB ran next to the VSB's line between Rorschach Hafen (harbour) and Rorschach. The Lake Line of the NOB and the Bischofszellerbahn's Gossau–Sulgen line, which was commissioned in 1876, relieved the VSB of some traffic. When the NOB opened the shorter Lake Zürich left bank railway (Zürich–Thalwil–Ziegelbrücke) in 1875, the former Wallisellen–Rapperswil line lost importance. The VSB could only continue operations with extreme cost cutting. Under the leadership of Adolf Klose, mechanical engineering achievements and locomotive designs were created at the Rorschach workshop that received attention and recognition.

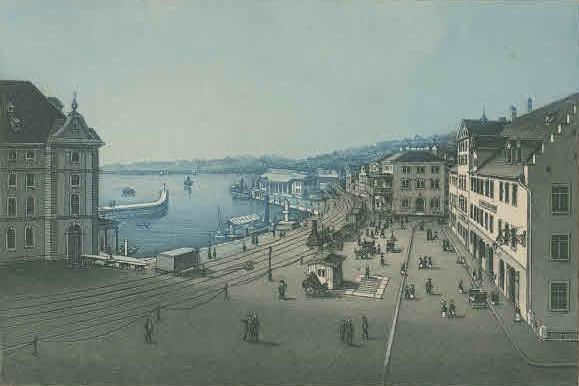
Rorschach: Harbour with harbour (Hafen) station. The tracks of the VSB and the NOB lay next to each other between the harbour and the town station.

As part of merger negotiations, the VSB was able to acquire the concession for the realisation of the Bözberg railway line on 16 July 1857. The VSB abandoned this concession in 1864 due to lack of financial resources.

The VSB managed the operation of some other companies, such as the Toggenburgerbahn (TB, opened in 1870), the Wald-Rüti-Bahn (WR, opened in 1876 and now part of the Tösstal Railway) and temporarily the Zürichsee–Gotthardbahn (ZGB). The VSB was also financially involved in the Toggenburgerbahn and the Wald–Rüti-Bahn.

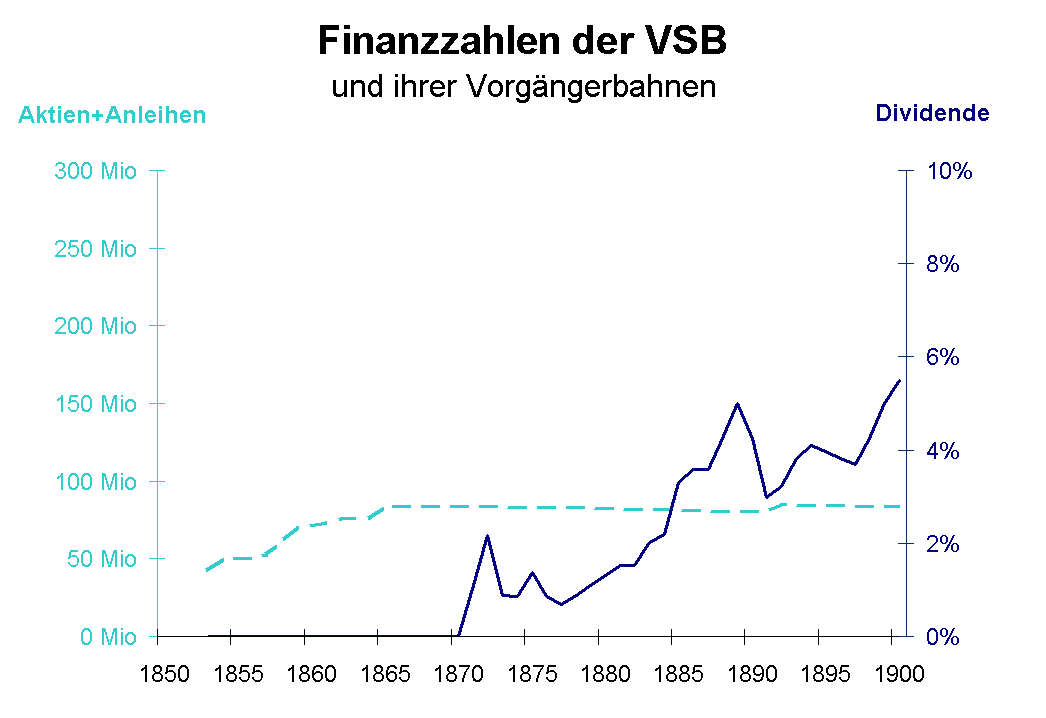
Share capital and fixed bonds (left scale) as well as dividends (right scale) of the VSB ...

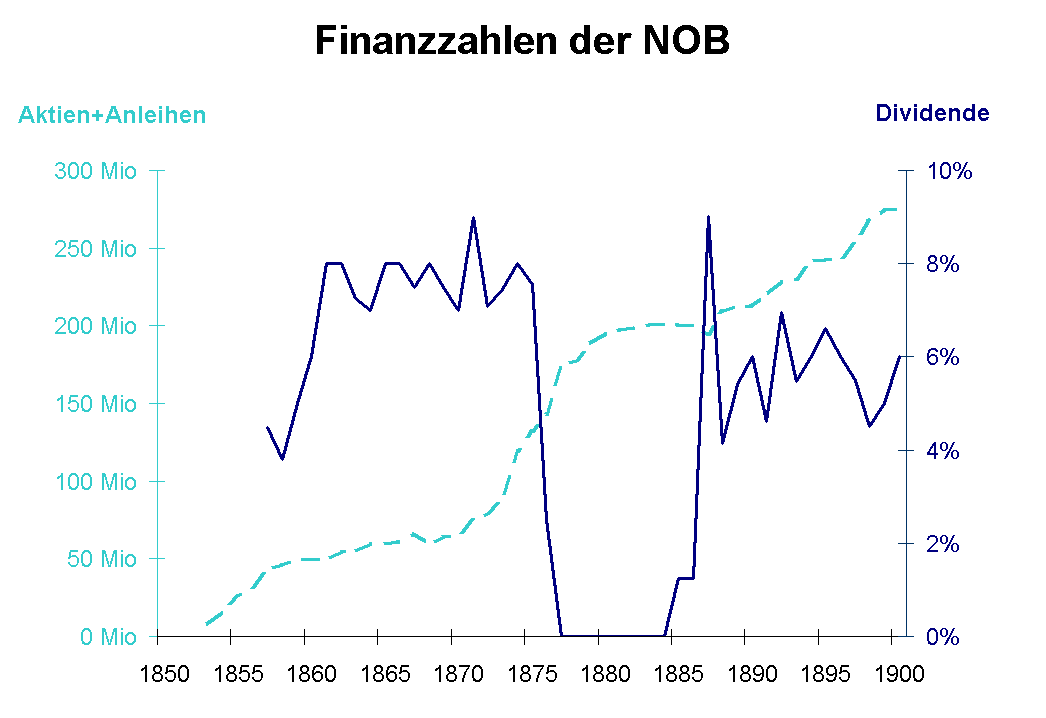
... and the NOB for comparison.

Until the 1870s, the VSB suffered from lack of international connections. The Vorarlberg Railway (Vorarlbergbahn; VB) opened the Lindau–St. Margrethen link on 1 August 1872 and the Feldkirch–Buchs section on 20 October 1872, leading to an increase in traffic. The Arlberg Railway, which was opened on 6 September 1884, had a significant influence on the development of traffic. The VSB gave access to two metre-gauge lines of the Rhaetian Railway (Rhätische Bahn), the Landquart–Davos lines, opened in 1889, and the Chur–Thusis line, opened in 1896.

The VSB suffered, like many other companies, during the economic crisis of the late 1870s. Its stock prices dropped massively. In contrast to the NOB or the Swiss Central Railway, the VSB were able to distribute modest dividends from 1871 onwards. Because the VSB was not able to expand its network after 1859, it had low debt and its financial situation was very solid.

In the Vonwil train crash, a train coming from Winterthur derailed at Vonwil in St. Gallen on 31 December 1879. The train's two locomotives came to lie on the left and right of the railway track with the carriages pushed into each other. The accident claimed two fatalities and several injuries, some serious.

== Route network ==
No.	Line	Opening	Remarks	Property length	Operating length
1.	Winterthur–St. Gallen	28 September 1855 – 25 March 1856	Built by the Sankt Gallisch-Appenzellische Eisenbahn (SGAE)	71.889 km	72.765 km
1.	St. Gallen–Rorschach	25 October 1856	Built by the Sankt Gallisch-Appenzellische Eisenbahn (SGAE)	71.889 km	72.765 km
2.	Rorschach Hafen–Rorschach	25 October 1856	Built by the Sankt Gallisch-Appenzellische Eisenbahn (SGAE)	92.349 km	91.730 km
2.	Rorschach–St. Margrethen–Sargans–Chur	25 August 1857 – 1 July 1858	SOB project	92.349 km	91.730 km
3.	Sargans–Weesen–Ziegelbrücke	15 February 1859 – 1 July 1859	SOB project	93.048 km	102.194 km
3.	Ziegelbrücke–Rapperswil	15 February 1859	SOB project	93.048 km	102.194 km
3.	Rapperswil–Uster–Wallisellen (–Zürich)	1 August 1856 – 15 Feb 1859	Built by the Gl-TB and the VSB	93.048 km	102.194 km
4.	Weesen–Näfels–Glarus	15 February 1859	SOB project Weesen–Näfels: operation discontinued in 1918 and closed in 1931	11.638 km	11.488 km
5.	Wil–Ebnat-Kappel railway	24 June 1870	Built by the TB		24.852 km
6.	Wald-Rüti-Bahn (WR): Wald–Rüti	29 September 1876			6.570 km
7.	Zürichsee–Gotthardbahn (ZGB): Rapperswil–Pfäffikon SZ	27 August 1878 (until 31 December 1889)	Merged with the WE in 1890		4.020 km
	Total			268.924 km	313.619 km

== Rolling stock ==
In 1882, the company owned 59 locomotives, 197 passenger cars and 965 freight cars.

== Operations ==
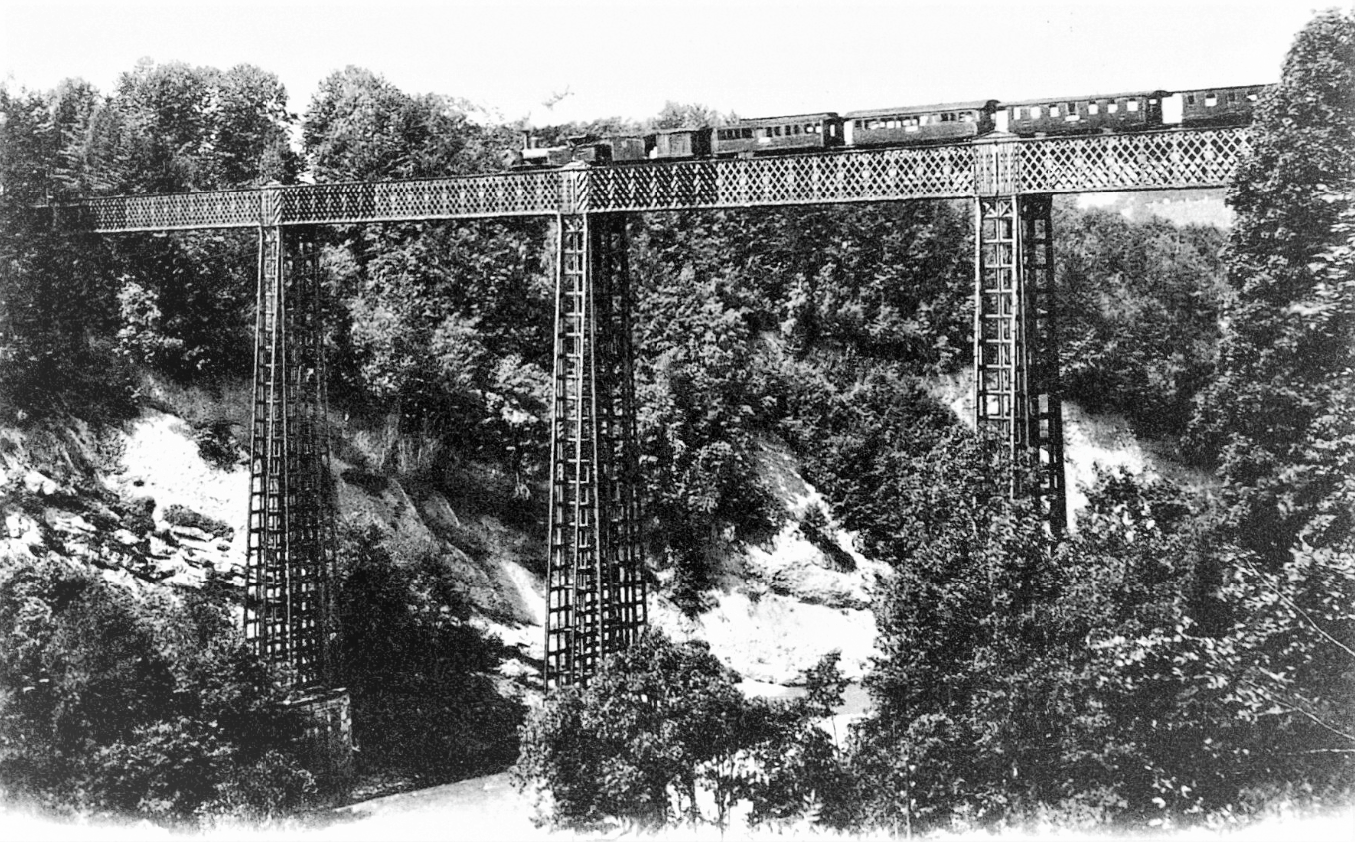
Sitter Viaduct near St. Gallen. The bridges over the Sitter, Glatt, Uze and Thur were built according to the same design principles.

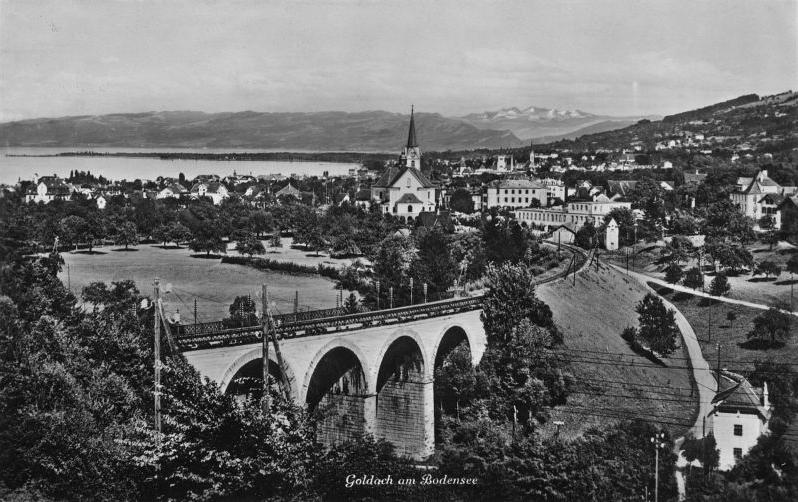
The still single-track Goldach Viaduct during the steam era in the early 1920s.

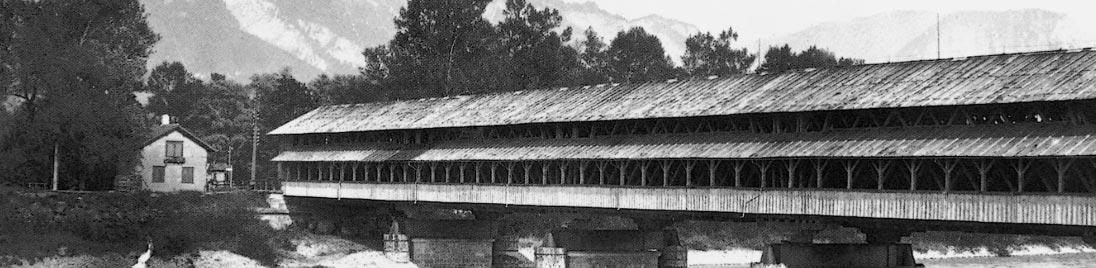
The covered wooden bridge at Ragaz survived the sparks of the steam locomotives from 1857 to 1928.

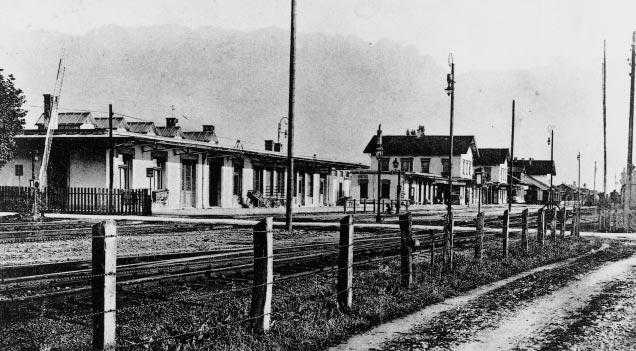
Buchs station with level crossing in 1905.

The rising price of wood forced the VSB to search for alternatives for firing their steam locomotives and it secured a large peat deposit in Möggingen near Radolfzell in 1857. Nevertheless, as the railway developed as a means of mass transport, the company gained access to foreign coal deposits. The conversion to coal firing was largely completed at the VSB in 1861.

The VSB implemented telegraphic signalling with electrical signal discs invented by Matthäus Hipp in 1865. Carriages and locomotives were converted to the buffer system in 1872.

The Federal Shooting Festival (Eidgenössisches Schützenfest) took place in St. Gallen from 18 to 27 July 1874. The VSB transported 140,000 people to St. Gallen over ten days. This required the assistance of staff and rolling stock from the NOB and the VB.

The first through train from Rorschach via St. Gallen was introduced to serve the Swiss National Exhibition (Schweizerische Landesausstellung) in Zürich in 1883. Previously passengers had to change in Winterthur from VSB to NOB trains.

The company changed from Bernese time to Central European Time on 1 June 1894. Direct coaches ran between St. Gallen and Geneva from 1 June 1896.

== Nationalisation ==
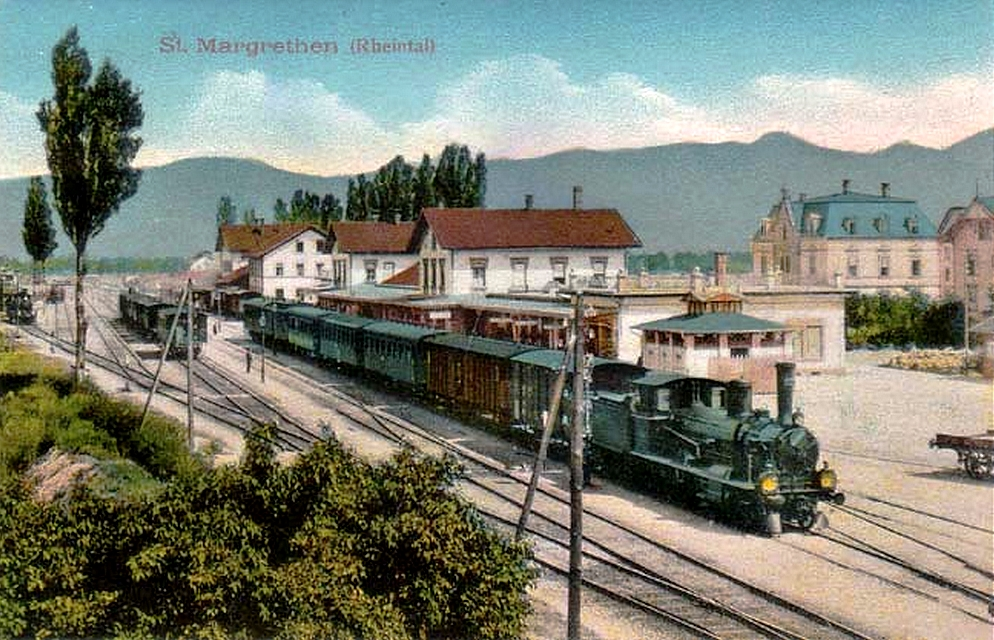
St. Margrethen border station with a passenger train ready to run towards St. Gallen. It is headed by locomotive B 3/4 of the United Swiss Railways (No. 101-115).

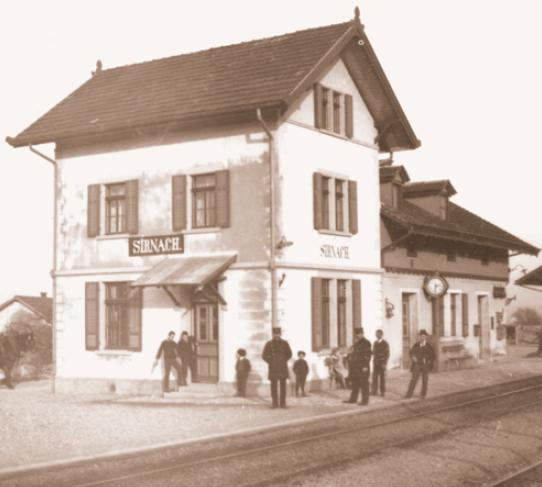
The station building in Sirnach with a raised transverse wing.

In 1901, shortly before the nationalisation. the VSB took over the Toggenburgerbahn (TB) at no cost from the Canton of St. Gallen, which indirectly subsidised the construction of the Ricken Tunnel. The VSB was nationalised on 1 July 1902 and subsequently became part of the Swiss Federal Railways (SBB). The VSB had already been operated on behalf of the federal government since 1 January 1901.

Part of the old corporate structures remained for a long time. The former SBB District Directorate IV was created from the headquarters of the VSB in St. Gallen. The former SBB main workshop in Chur had its roots in the SOB. Over time, the now closed SBB Rorschach locomotive depot emerged from the main workshop of the VSB. The railway built in Uster what is now the oldest roundhouse with a turntable in Switzerland. The carriage house has been restored and now serves as a depot and locomotive workshop of the Dampfbahn-Verein Zürcher Oberland, the heritage railway that operates the Bauma–Hinwil line.

The electrification of the line required the replacement of the Sitter, Glatt, Uze and Thur bridges between St. Gallen and Wil and the wooden Rhine bridge at Ragaz. However, the stone Goldach Viaduct bridge over the Goldach River has been preserved and has been used by two tracks since 1993.

The chainage (kilometre markings) has not been changed on the lines of the former VSB. The kilometre measurements still start in Sargans, where kilometre 0 is located.
