= Thymallus yaluensis =

Scientific classification
- Kingdom: Animalia
- Phylum: Chordata
- Class: Actinopterygii
- Order: Salmoniformes
- Family: Salmonidae
- Genus: Thymallus
- Species: T. yaluensis

Binomial name
- Thymallus yaluensis T. Mori, 1928

Species of fish

Thymallus yaluensis, also known as Yalu grayling, is a putative species of freshwater ray-finned fish in the genus Thymallus (graylings) of the family Salmonidae. It is endemic to the upper Yalu River on the China-North Korea border.

== Description ==
Thymallus yaluensis is a small fish, with a maximum recorded length of 20 cm (7.9 in). It is renowned in Korea for having "the most beautiful form and fins of a freshwater fish".

== Taxonomy dispute ==
Some confusion exists regarding the identity of T. yaluensis, as it closely resembles the Arctic grayling (Thymallus arcticus) in form and has often been treated as a subspecies (T. a. yaluensis). However, FishBase recognizes it as an independent species. According to mitochondrial DNA, T. yaluensis is, however, inseparable from the Amur grayling (Thymallus grubii), and was suggested to be a junior synonym of that. Confusingly, it has also been reported from widely separate regions including Siberia, the Alps in Europe, and the northern Mississippi River drainage in North America.
