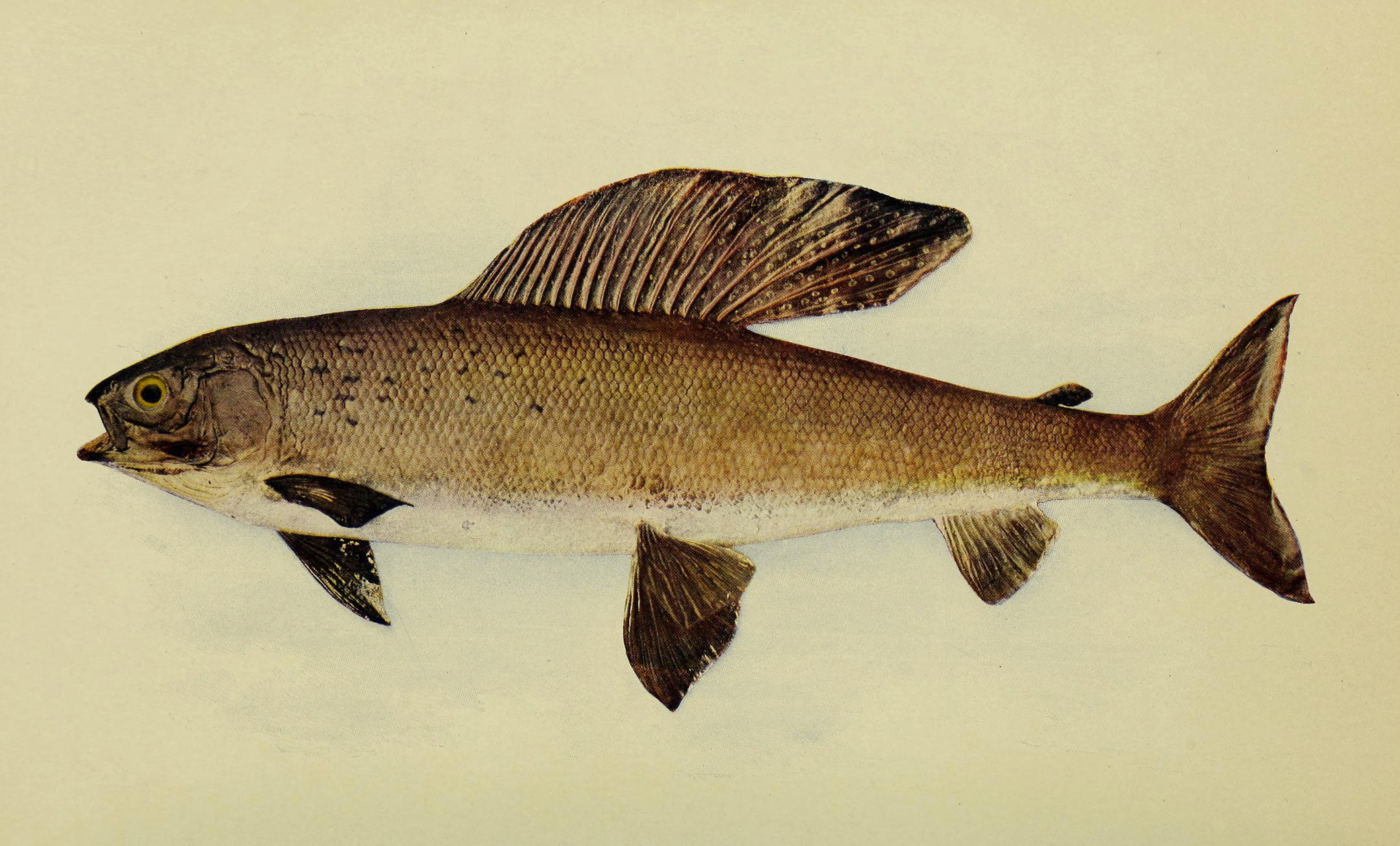
- Mounted specimen of Montana grayling (1904)

Conservation status
- Least Concern (IUCN 3.1)

- Critically Imperiled (NatureServe)

Scientific classification
- Kingdom: Animalia
- Phylum: Chordata
- Class: Actinopterygii
- Division: Teleostei
- Order: Salmoniformes
- Family: Salmonidae
- Genus: Thymallus
- Species: T. arcticus
- Subspecies: T. a. montanus

Trinomial name
- Thymallus arcticus montanus Milner, 1874

Synonyms
- Thymallus ontariensis montanus Thymallus signifer montanus Thymallus tricolor montanus (Milner, 1874)

= Montana Arctic grayling =

Subspecies of fish

The Montana Arctic grayling (Thymallus arcticus montanus) is a North American freshwater fish in the salmon family Salmonidae. The Montana Arctic grayling, native to the upper Missouri River basin in Montana and Wyoming, is a disjunct population or subspecies of the more widespread Arctic grayling (Thymallus arcticus). It occurs in fluvial (or river–dwelling) and adfluvial, lacustrine (or lake–dwelling) forms. The Montana grayling is a species of special concern in Montana and had candidate status for listing under the national Endangered Species Act. It underwent a comprehensive status review by the U.S. Fish and Wildlife Service, which in 2014 decided not to list it as threatened or endangered. Current surviving native populations in the Big Hole River and Red Rock River drainages represent approximately four percent of the subspecies' historical range.

== Taxonomy ==
The scientific name of the Montana Arctic grayling, when treated as a subspecies, is Thymallus arcticus montanus. It was first described in 1874 as Thymallus montanus by fisheries biologist James W. Milner. The type specimen was collected by Acting Assistant Surgeon, George Scott Oximixon, U.S. Army near Camp Baker, Montana Territory. Camp Baker was located very close to the Smith river northwest of White Sulphur Springs in Meagher County. Milner also based his description on three specimens taken by geologist Ferdinand V. Hayden during his Geological Survey of 1872 from Willow Creek in Gallatin County, Montana.

North American conservation and fisheries authorities generally do not cite the Montana grayling as a subspecies but a distinct population segment of the Arctic grayling Thymallus arcticus.

== Description ==
The Montana Arctic grayling has a large, sail-like dorsal (back) fin and colorful body markings. The grayling comes in a wide array of colors. Their dorsal fins are typically fringed in red and dotted with large iridescent red, aqua, or purple spots and markings. These colorful markings are most dramatic on large grayling. Graylings' backs are usually dark. Their sides can be black, silver, gold, or blue. A band of gold forms a border between their sides and white bellies, which are in sharp contrast to their pelvic fins striated with iridescent orange, red, or pink. The sides of the body and head can be freckled with black spots. A black slash lies on each side of the lower jaw. The iris of their eyes is often gold in color. Only their adipose, caudal (tail), pectoral, and anal fins are without much color; typically dull and gray.

== Range ==
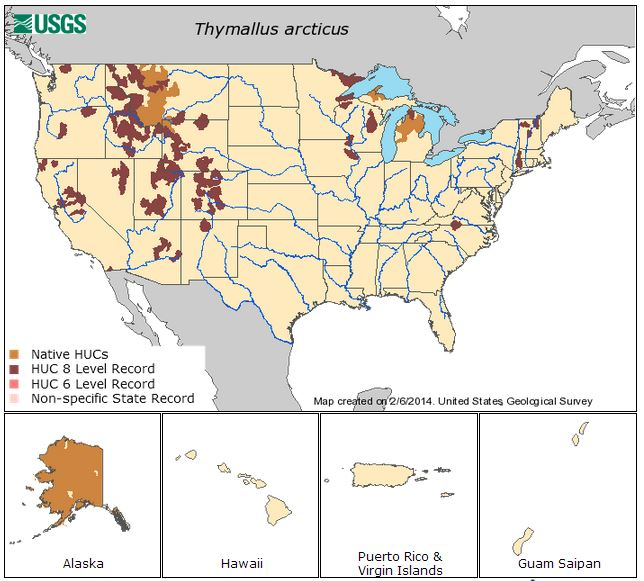
Native and introduced range of Arctic grayling, Thymallus arcticus in U.S.

The historic native range of the fluvial form of Montana Arctic grayling encompasses the mainstem and tributaries of the upper Missouri river as far downstream as the Great Falls. This range was isolated from the northern populations of Arctic grayling in Canada in the post glaciation period from southern populations in Montana and Michigan. The Michigan grayling (T. a. tricolor) is now extinct. During the 1804–1806 Lewis and Clark Expedition, the explorers did not encounter the Montana grayling until they reached the Beaverhead river, a secondary tributary of the Missouri. They described the grayling as "white trout". In 1915, U.S. Bureau of Fisheries biologist, W.C. Kendall described the Montana grayling as "abundant" in the Madison, Firehole and Gibbon rivers in Yellowstone National Park. These Missouri river headwaters represent the southern extent of the historic range in Wyoming.

The introduction of non-native brook, brown and rainbow trout into the upper Missouri river basin which began in the 1890s initiated a severe decline in fluvial grayling populations and range. In Howard Back's 1938 work The Waters of Yellowstone with Rod and Fly, he lamented that he was unable to find any grayling in the Madison river. By the 1950s, the only grayling in the park were lacustrine forms introduced into Grebe lake.

The native range of the adfluvial form was restricted to the Red Rock Lakes at the headwaters of the Beaverhead river and several small mountain lakes in the Big Hole River drainage.

The current range of fluvial Montana grayling is restricted to approximately 80 miles (130 km) of the Big Hole river between Melrose, Wisdom and Jackson, Montana. The highest concentrations of grayling are in the Wisdom, Montana reach of the Big Hole river. This represents approximately four percent of the grayling's original native range. In the early 20th century fishery agencies began introduction of Arctic grayling in suitable lake environments in the state. Most of these introductions were from fluvial stocks that originated in Montana, however some introductions came from Arctic grayling populations in Alaska or Canada.

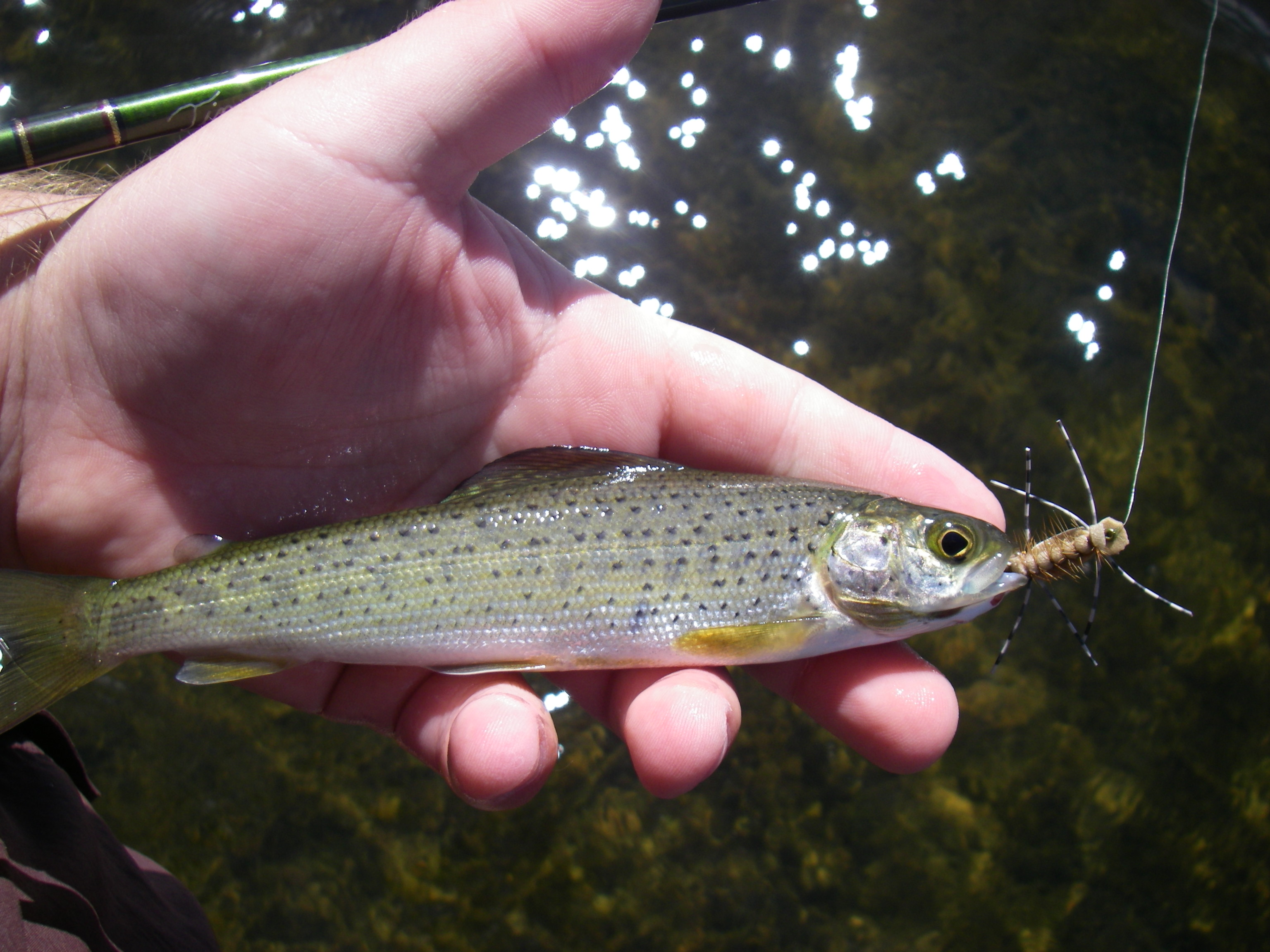
Grebe Lake grayling

In 1921, U.S. Fish Commission personnel stocked Grebe Lake, at that time fishless, with a lacustrine form of the Montana arctic grayling. The original stocks came from Georgetown Lake near Anaconda, Montana. In an effort to re-establish grayling in western states, over 72 million grayling eggs were harvested from Grebe Lake between 1931 and 1956 and distributed to hatcheries. Most lake dwelling grayling in the west today can be genetically traced to the Grebe Lake stocks. Grebe Lake was closed to fishing until 1944 because of the fish culture operations at the lake.

== Life cycle ==
Fluvial Montana grayling spend their entire life cycle in riverine environments. They make seasonal migrations within the river system for spawning, feeding and overwintering. Migrations of up to 50 miles (80 km) have been documented. Grayling inhabit cold, freestone streams having low to intermediate gradients. Adult fluvial grayling prefer pool habitats. In Montana, they spawn from late April to mid-May by depositing adhesive eggs over sand and gravel without excavating a redd. Eggs mature and hatch within a few weeks. Juvenile grayling are weak swimmers and prefer rearing habitat along stream margins that serve as velocity refuges, back-waters in side channels, or waters adjacent to beaver dams. Grayling in Montana typically reach maturity in their third or fourth year of life, and seldom live beyond six years. grayling, including juveniles are opportunistic feeders and routinely feed on larval, pupal and adult forms of aquatic insects (typically caddisflies, stoneflies, mayflies and aquatic diptera). They also consume adult forms of terrestrial insects (typically ants, beetles, grasshoppers and crickets) that fall into the water. Other prey include crayfish, shrimp, and other crustaceans. The aggressive feeding behavior of grayling is linked to their pattern of habitat selection whereby they often reside in deep pools with little large woody debris that allow for efficient and opportunistic feeding by this visual predator.

Adfluvial forms of Montana grayling feed and overwinter in lake environments and migrate up suitable tributary streams to spawn.

== Conservation ==
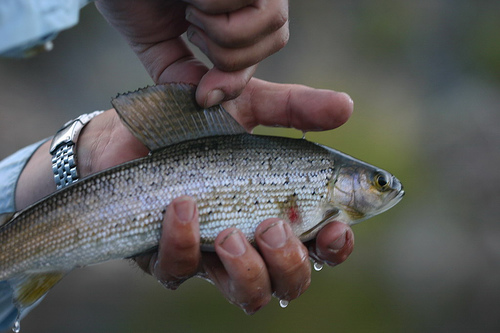
Fluvial Arctic grayling from Big Hole River

=== Candidate Conservation Agreement with Assurances ===
In March, 2006, the U.S. Fish and Wildlife Service established a Candidate Conservation Agreement with Assurances between the USFWS and several non-Federal entities whereby non-Federal property owners who voluntarily agree to manage their lands or waters to remove threats to species at risk of becoming threatened or endangered receive assurances against additional regulatory requirements should that species be subsequently listed under the Endangered Species Act (ESA). The goal of the agreement was to secure and enhance a population of fluvial Arctic grayling (Thymallus arcticus) within the upper reaches of their historic range in the Big Hole River drainage. Parties to the agreement included "participating landowners" in the Big Hole river drainage, Montana Department of Fish, Wildlife and Parks, Montana Department of Natural Resources and Conservation, and US Department of Agriculture Natural Resources Conservation Service.

=== Endangered Species Act Status Assessment ===
On August 19, 2014, the US Fish and Wildlife Service announced that after years of status review, restoration, and pending listing decisions, the Montana Arctic grayling did not warrant listing under the Endangered Species Act due to effective conservation and partnerships. This marks a landmark decision and success story sparked in the early 1990s with the Arctic Grayling Recovery Program and Big Hole Watershed Committee and precipitated by the expansive Conservation Candidate Agreement with Assurances (CCAA). For more than 20 years ranchers, conservation groups, agencies and others worked together. Many individuals dedicated their careers or a large part of their time and energy to the benefit of the Big Hole River and its grayling. The Arctic grayling were the genesis of the Big Hole Watershed Committee in 1995 and central to its mission.

=== Reintroduction efforts ===
A Montana fluvial Arctic grayling brood program was developed to preserve the genetic integrity of Montana fluvial grayling and to provide a source of grayling for reintroduction efforts. Three fluvial brood stock populations are located at the Yellowstone River Trout Hatchery, Axolotl Chain of Lakes, and Green Hollow II Reservoir. Reintroduction efforts were initiated in 1997 in the upper Ruby River and expanded to the North and South forks of the Sun River in 1999, the lower Beaverhead River in 1999, and the Missouri River headwaters near Three Forks, Montana in 2000. Since 2002 reintroduction efforts have been focused on the upper Ruby River. In 2008 reintroductions occurred in the upper Ruby River and the North Fork of the Sun River with remote site incubators used to introduce grayling fry into the restoration reach. An environmental DNA assay using 5 liters (1.3 U.S. gal) of streamwater has been developed to identify grayling with high specificity against other native and non-native salmonids in Montana.
