= Thymallus brevipinnis =

Scientific classification
- Kingdom: Animalia
- Phylum: Chordata
- Class: Actinopterygii
- Order: Salmoniformes
- Family: Salmonidae
- Genus: Thymallus
- Species: T. brevipinnis

Binomial name
- Thymallus brevipinnis Svetovidov, 1931

Synonyms
- Thymallus arcticus brevipinnis Svetovidov, 1931

Species of fish

Thymallus brevipinnis is a species of freshwater ray-finned fish belonging to the subfamily Thymallinae, the graylings, part of the family Salmonidae. This species is endemic to Lake Baikal in Siberia where it is benthopelagic. Some workers regard this taxon as a junior synonym of Thymallus baicalensis.
