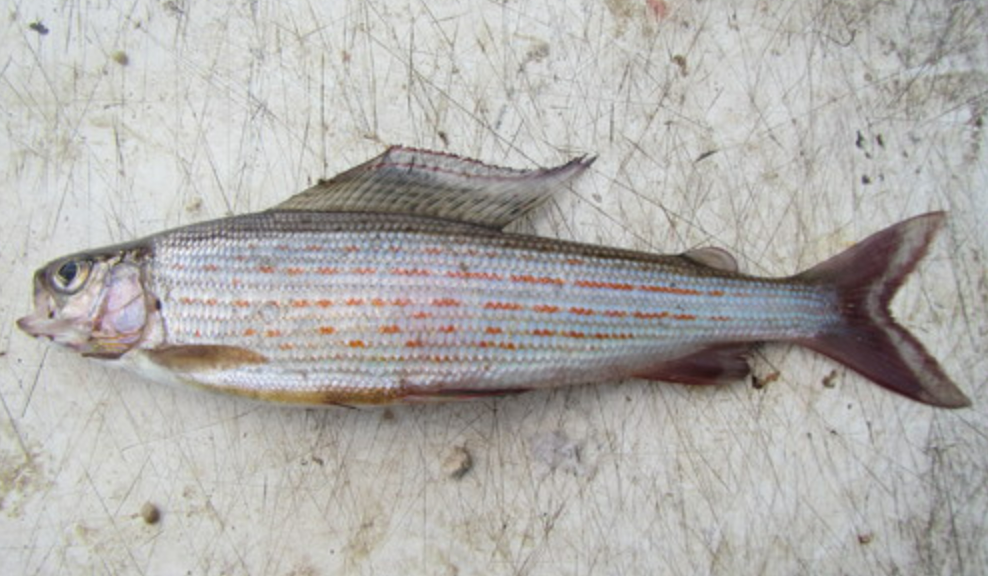

Scientific classification
- Kingdom: Animalia
- Phylum: Chordata
- Class: Actinopterygii
- Division: Teleostei
- Order: Salmoniformes
- Family: Salmonidae
- Genus: Thymallus
- Species: T. tugarinae

Binomial name
- Thymallus tugarinae Knizhin, Antonov, Safronov & Weiss, 2007

= Thymallus tugarinae =

Species of fish

Thymallus tugarinae, also known as the Lower Amur grayling, is a species of freshwater fish in the salmon family. It is found in the lower reaches of the Amur river on the border of the Russian far east and Heilongjiang Province of China. It was first described in 2007 and is sometimes mistaken for the Amur grayling.

== Description ==
The Lower Amur grayling can reach a recorded length of 25.5 cm (10 inches) and 6 years old. There is a wide red to maroon edging with the width 5–6 mm seen along the upper margin of the dorsal fin. 4-5 rows of same-color spots are observed to be in parallel with the edging. There is also bright orange sinuous stripes between the scale rows going along the body. The upper jaw overlaps with the anterior margin of the eye.

== Life cycle ==
The Lower Amur grayling spawns in rivers of the Amur Basin from the middle to the end of May. The autumn downstream migration in tributaries of the lower Amur river takes place from September to October. The fish mostly feed on mayfly and stonefly larvae, imago caddis and other bugs. It is also reported that in the Anyui River, they feed on various zoobenthos organisms.
