= Thymallus ligericus =

Conservation status
- Vulnerable (IUCN 3.1)

Scientific classification
- Kingdom: Animalia
- Phylum: Chordata
- Class: Actinopterygii
- Order: Salmoniformes
- Family: Salmonidae
- Genus: Thymallus
- Species: T. ligericus

Binomial name
- Thymallus ligericus Persat, Weiss, Froufe, Secci-Petretto & Denys, 2019

Species of fish

Thymallus ligericus, the Loire grayling, is a European freshwater fish species in the salmon family Salmonidae. The species is endemic to the upper Loire drainage in France, where it lives in medium to large foothills, canyon and plateau rivers of the mountainous regions.

The Loire grayling was separated as a species distinct from the more widespread European grayling, Thymallus thymallus, in 2019. It is morphologically distinguished from that species by a more elongated body, by its pointed snout (with a straight or convex snout profile vs a concave profile of T. thymallus), a more inferior mouth, a high number of black dots on the sides, a shorter head and a shorter horizontal eye diameter. It can also be distinguished by molecular characters.
