= Grayling Day =

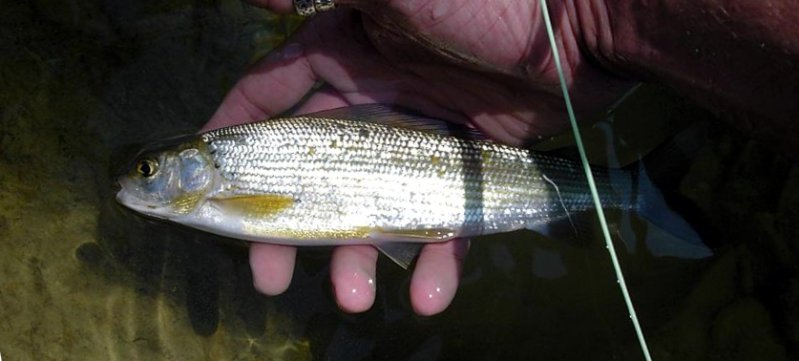
A grayling

In the United Kingdom, in the early autumn, fishermen often use the name of the grayling (Thymallus thymallus) as a by-word for their seasonal jolly: a Grayling Day is often fisherman-talk for a party. Many clubs as well as fisherman friends will organise their annual Grayling Day in the autumn when it is traditional for there to be large quantities of both food and drink, prefaced by a token amount of fishing.

At the event, there will often be speeches and toasts.

The celebration is named after the grayling due to its popularity with fishermen: apart from having one of the most beautiful dorsal fins of any fish, the grayling rises freely to the surface and reaches its peak when the temperature starts to fall, making an easy catch for fishermen in the middle of the trout closed season.
