= Thymallus flavomaculatus =

Scientific classification
- Domain: Eukaryota
- Kingdom: Animalia
- Phylum: Chordata
- Class: Actinopterygii
- Order: Salmoniformes
- Family: Salmonidae
- Genus: Thymallus
- Species: T. flavomaculatus

Binomial name
- Thymallus flavomaculatus Knizhin, Antonov & Weiss, 2006

Species of fish

Thymallus flavomaculatus, also known as yellow-spotted grayling, is a species of brackish-water fish in the salmon family. It is found in Khabarovsk and Primorsky Krai of the Russian Far East, as well as the Sea of Japan and the Sea of Okhotsk. They usually live near or on the bottom of the water body.

== Description ==
It is unclear about the range of their sizes. There is a yellow-orange spot on the last two-five interray membranes on the upper posterior of the dorsal fin. From the fin base upwards there are 4-5 rows of small round spots with dull fringing. The upper jaw reaches beyond the anterior eye edge and reaches the pupil. There are no teeth on the vomer and tongue.
