= Rorschach–St. Gallen railway line =

Railway line in Switzerland

Rorschach–St. Gallen
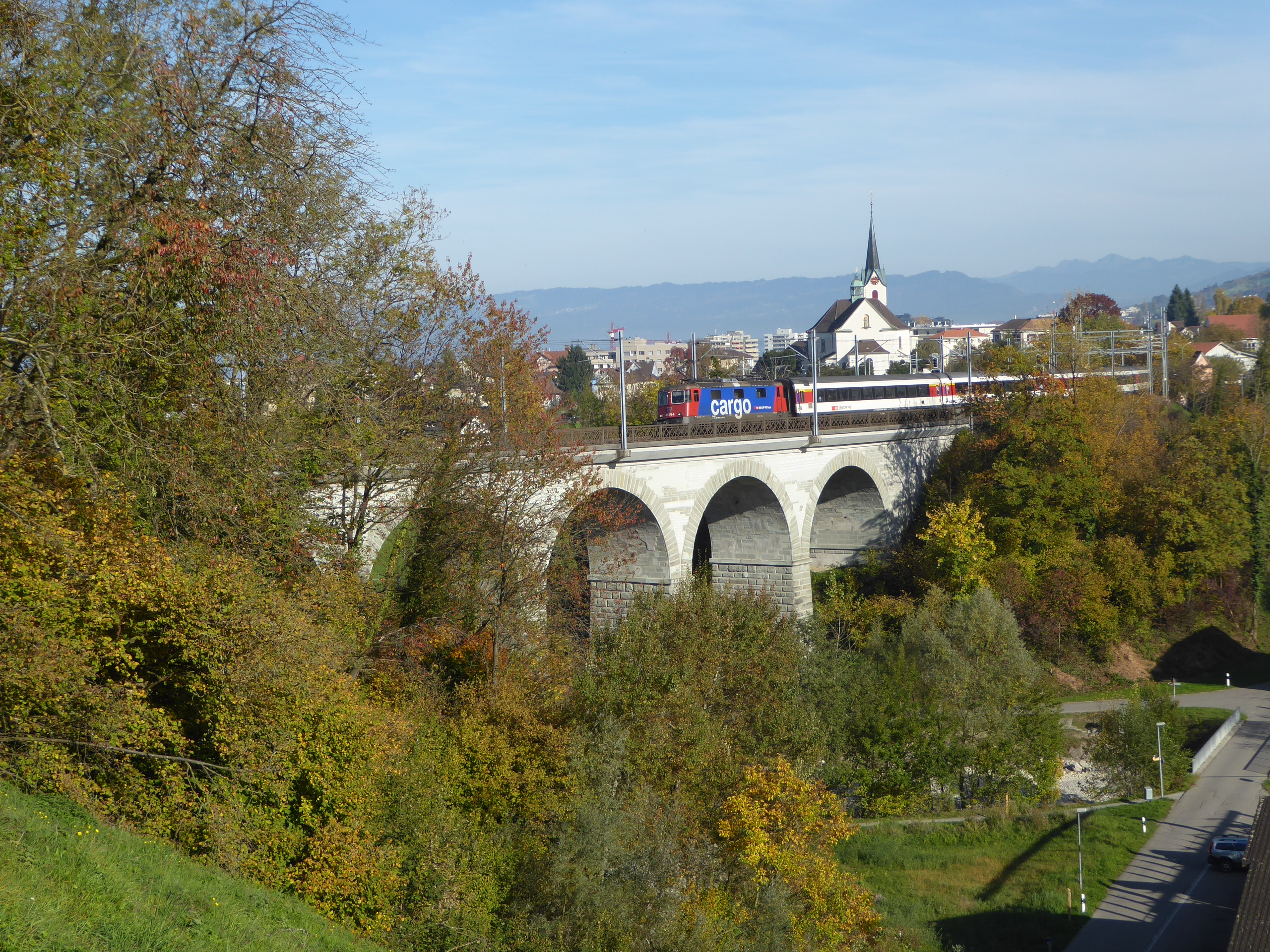
- Goldach Viaduct over the Goldach River with Eurocity Munich–Zürich service

Overview
- Line number: 880
- Locale: Switzerland
- Termini: Rorschach; St. Gallen

Technical
- Line length: 15.1 km (9.4 mi)
- Track gauge: 1,435 mm (4 ft 8 1/2 in)
- Electrification: 15 kV/16.7 Hz AC overhead catenary
- Maximum incline: 2.2%

The Rorschach–St. Gallen railway line is a standard gauge railway line in the Swiss canton of St. Gallen and belongs to the Swiss Federal Railways (SBB).

The 15 kilometre-long line was opened on 25 October 1856 by the St. Gallisch-Appenzellische Eisenbahn (SAGE) and follows its original course, except for the tunnel between St. Gallen and St. Gallen St. Fiden and a little curve straightening. The line ran from Rorschach Hafen station to St. Gallen, with trains having to reverse in Rorschach.

== History ==
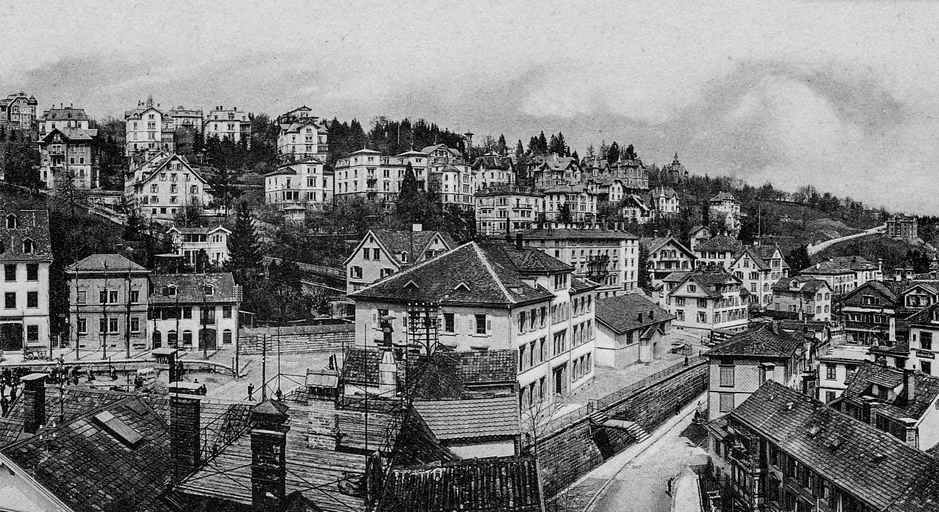
Before the opening of the Rosenberg tunnel, the line ran through the town of St. Gallen. Note the cutting in front of the former school crossed by a footbridge

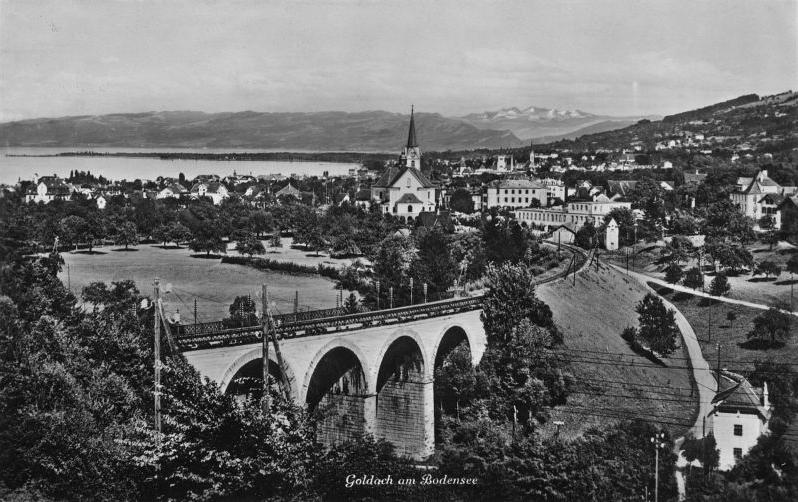
Goldach Viaduct, in the background is the village of Goldach and Lake Constance

The St. Gallisch-Appenzellische Eisenbahn (SGAE) had opened its line between Winterthur and St. Gallen between October 1855 and March 1856. It completed a further extension from St. Gallen to Rorschach Hafen via Rorschach on 25 October 1856. Operations on this line through the Steinach valley between Mörschwil and St. Gallen was very slow, because a rise of about 250 metres had to be climbed on this section of the line. The SGAE merged with the Glatthalbahn in 1857 to form the United Swiss Railways, which owned the line through the end of the century.

The route became part of the Swiss Federal Railways during the nationalisation of the railways on 1 July 1902. Electrical operations commenced on 15 May 1927 at 15,000 Volt 16 2/3 Hz between Winterthur and Rorschach.

The section between St. Gallen and St. Gallen St. Fiden was originally built with a single track in a cutting, over which several footbridges and bridges were built. Congestion of this section was expected with the construction of the Bodensee–Toggenburg railway (Bodensee-Toggenburg-Bahn). It was decided to move the line underground, as it was not considered possible to rebuild the line with double track in the open. As a result, St. Gallen station was rebuilt and relocated. The new section was put into operation with the 1466 metre-long, double-track Rosenberg Tunnel on 1 April 1912.

The railway line crosses an area affected by earth creepage in the Steinach valley in Galgentobel. This has caused rail operations to be interrupted several times. After the slope slipped again in early summer 1975, an emergency bridge had to be built in the summer of 1975. As a result, this section needed to be bypassed by a new bridge. This project included the duplication of the track. Therefore, a 568 metre-long bridge was built on the valley side. The prestressed concrete bridge has ten piers. The second track was not relocated initially. The stress test was carried out on 4 April 1982 with twelve Ae 6/6 locomotives. The bridge distorted by 15 millimetres which corresponded with the calculated values. The bridge was then handed over to traffic. The extension of double-track towards Mörschwil was made only after the construction and the inauguration of the bridge. Thus, later there was an isolated section of double track between Mörschwil and the newly created operations yard at Engwil. This situation continued until 2008, when the section between Mörschwil and Goldach was rebuilt as double track.

In 2001, Rorschach-Stadt (town) station was added. It is planned to complete the doubling of the line. Duplication is now complete between St. Gallen St. Fiden and Mörschwil. Today only part of the line between Goldach and Rorschach is still single track. Duplication of this section is planned to be carried out from 2016 until the end of 2018.

== Operations ==
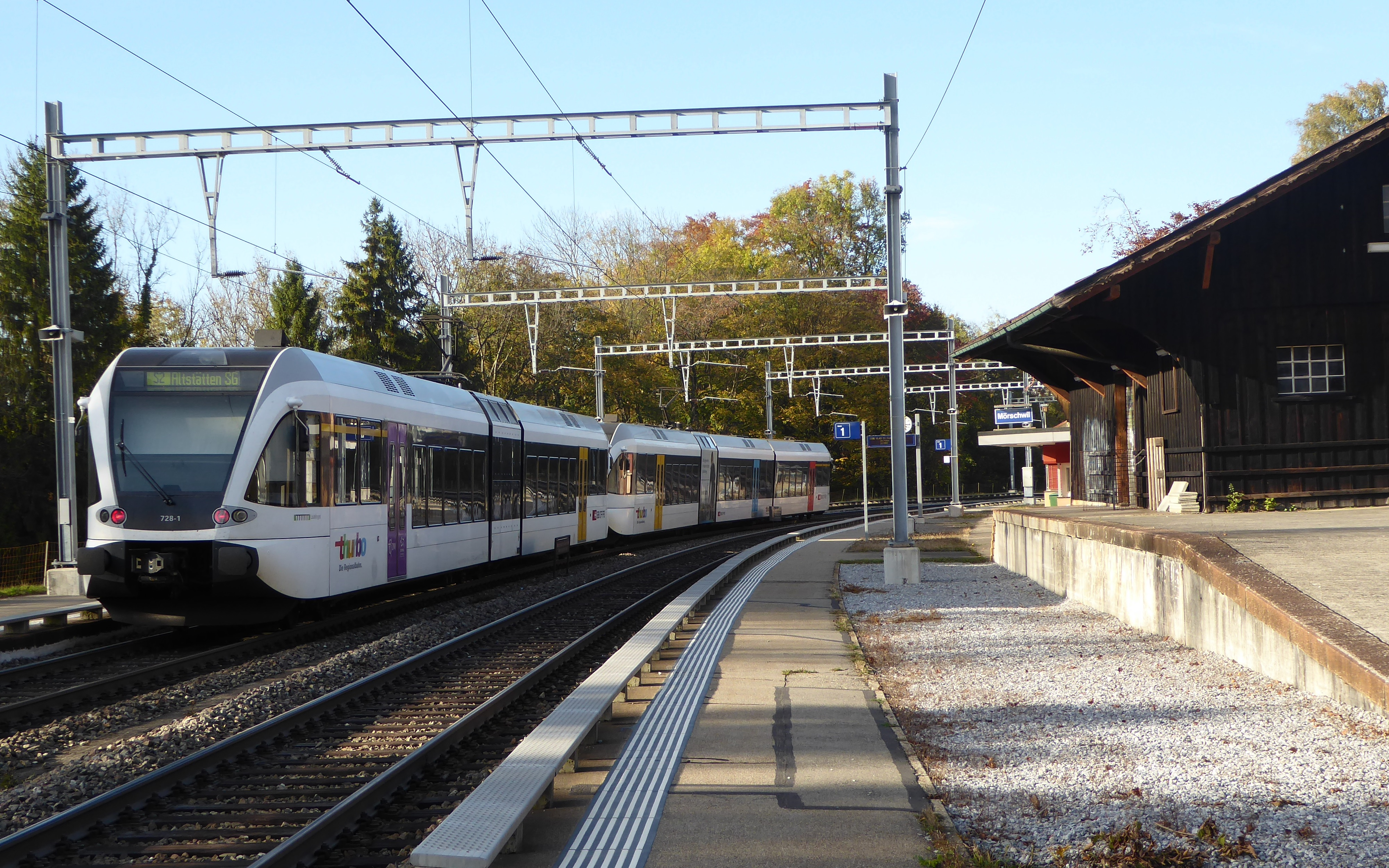
Two Thurbo articulated railcars in Mörschwil running as the S2 service (St. Gallen–Rorschach–Altstätten)

In local traffic, the line is used by the lines S2, S3, and S4 of the St. Gallen S-Bahn and by the longer-distance InterRegio IR 13. These four services combine to provide service every fifteen minutes between St. Gallen and Rorschach. In long-distance traffic, it is used by the Zürich–Munich EuroCity service.

The railway line is used on weekdays by around 110 passenger and 10 freight trains. This makes it one of the busiest railway lines in Switzerland using single-track or partially single-track lines.
