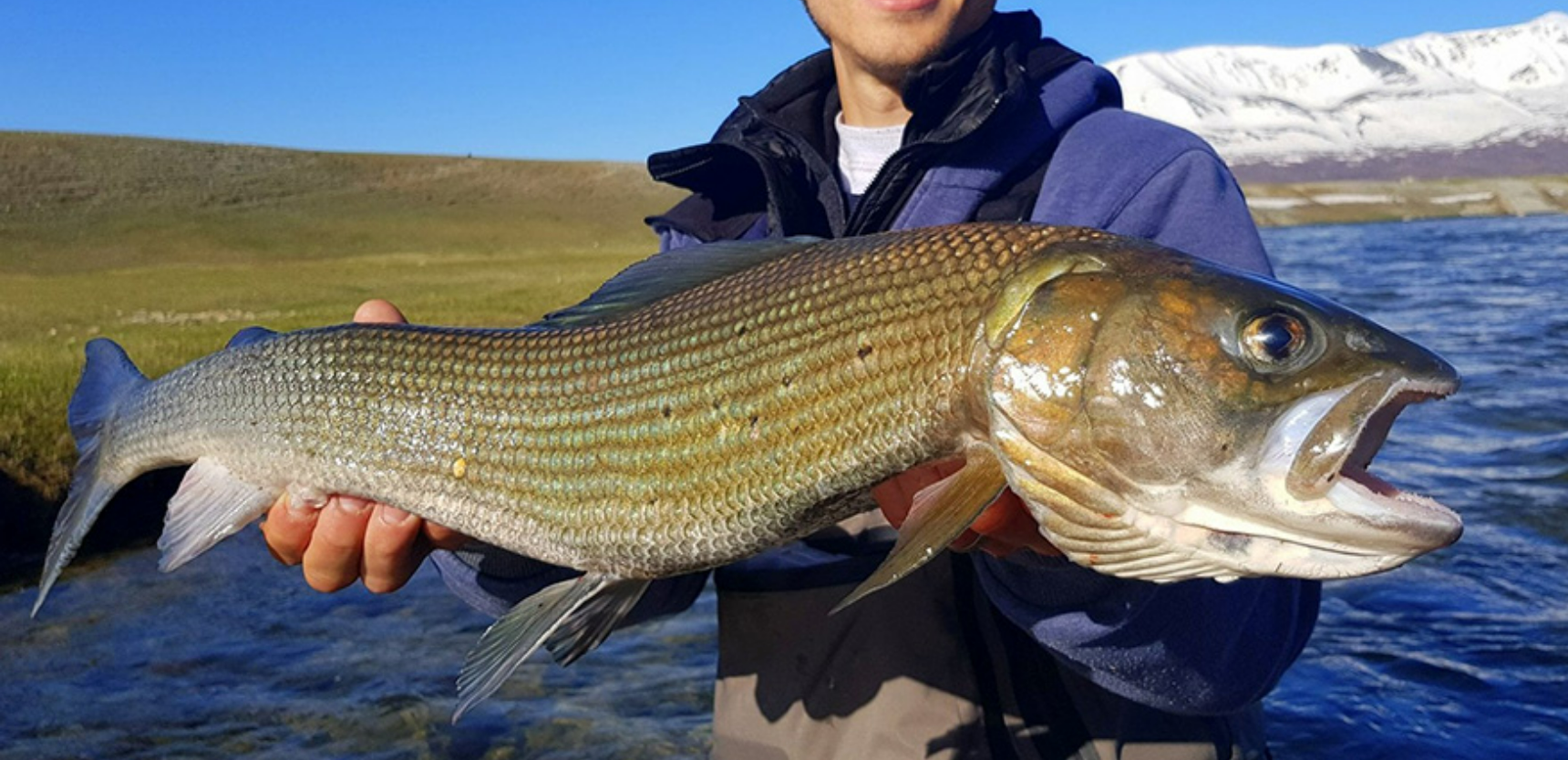
- A big Mongolian grayling caught by angler

Conservation status
- Not evaluated (IUCN 3.1)

Scientific classification
- Kingdom: Animalia
- Phylum: Chordata
- Class: Actinopterygii
- Order: Salmoniformes
- Family: Salmonidae
- Genus: Thymallus
- Species: T. brevirostris

Binomial name
- Thymallus brevirostris Kessler, 1879

= Mongolian grayling =

Species of fish

The Mongolian grayling (Thymallus brevirostris) is a freshwater species of fish of the genus Thymallus endemic to the landlocked rivers in Mongolia, Inner Mongolia Province of China and nearby parts of Russian far east. It is considered to be the largest grayling species in the world, and hence viewed as an auspicious sign by local tribes.

== Description ==
Mongolian grayling grow to a recorded maximum length of 65 cm (26 inches). The dorsal side is blackish, and the abdominal side is light. Black spots are uniformly present on both sides of the body. In adults, their upper jaw extends at least below the posterior edge of the eye. The Mongolian grayling is considered by researchers to be a relic from the Tertiary period.

== Distribution ==
The Mongolian grayling is native to the landlocked lake region of Mongolia and the nearby Russian and Chinese areas, such as Khovd River, Issyk-Kul Lake and other rivers and lakes of the Altai Mountains, with Arctic graylings and their hybrids often found together. It is mostly found in the Central Asian basin of western Mongolia and the border region with Kazakhstan, as well as the Tuva Republic in southern Siberia.

== Life cycle ==
The Mongolian grayling is omnivorous and lives predatorily at certain times of the year. During the summer months, it inhabits mountain rivers and lakes at all depths. In autumn and winter, it forms large shoals in front of the estuaries in lakes before spawning. It can only reproduce in cold, oxygen-rich water below temperatures of 20°C.
