= Goldach (river) =

River in Goldach, Switzerland

- Waterfall into the Goldach near Fischbach in Trogen

Location
- Country: Switzerland
- Cantons: Appenzell Ausserrhoden; St. Gallen; Thurgau
- Towns: Goldach

Physical characteristics
- Mouth: Lake Constance
  - location: Goldach, St. Gallen
  - coordinates: 47°29′24″N 9°28′38″E
- Length: 19.5 km (12.1 mi)

The Goldach is a 19.5 km (12.1 mi) long tributary of Lake Constance that flows through the cantons of Appenzell Ausserrhoden, St. Gallen, and Thurgau. It flows into Lake Constance at Goldach and forms part of the border of this municipality.

The Rorschach–St. Gallen railway line passes over the river via the Goldach Viaduct.

== Fauna ==
Animal species living in the river include European bullhead, European grayling, brown trout, stone crayfish, and noble crayfish. The river serves as a spawning ground for local trout populations.

== See also ==
- List of rivers of Switzerland
