= S3 (St. Gallen S-Bahn) =

Railway service in Switzerland

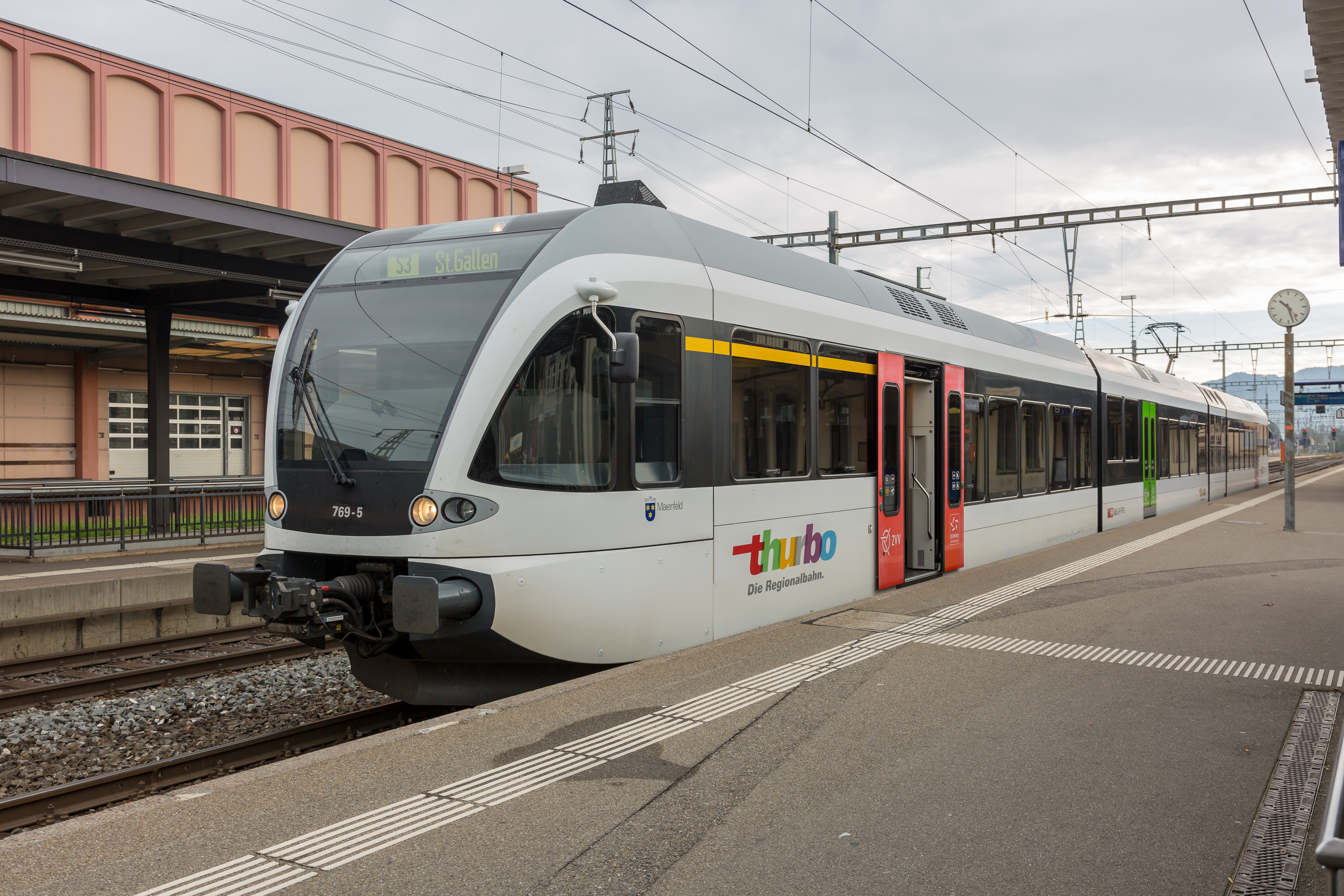
- A St. Gallen-bound S3 at St. Margrethen in 2018

Overview
- Status: Discontinued
- First service: 15 December 2013
- Last service: 12 December 2021
- Current operator(s): THURBO

Route
- Termini: St. Gallen; St. Margrethen
- Stops: 8
- Distance travelled: 26.7 kilometres (16.6 mi)
- Average journey time: 28 minutes
- Service frequency: Hourly
- Line(s) used: Rorschach–St. Gallen line; Chur–Rorschach line

The S3 was a railway service of the St. Gallen S-Bahn that provided hourly service between St. Gallen and St. Margrethen, in the Swiss canton of St. Gallen. THURBO, a joint venture of Swiss Federal Railways and the canton of Thurgau, operated the service. It was replaced by a lengthened S5 as part of the December 2021 timetable change.

== Operations ==
The S3 operated every hour between St. Gallen and St. Margrethen, using the Rorschach–St. Gallen and Chur–Rorschach lines. The S3, S2, S4, and InterRegio 13 combined for service every fifteen minutes between the two cities. In St. Margrethen, trains made a cross-platform connection with the S3 of the Vorarlberg S-Bahn.

== History ==
Until the December 2013 timetable change, the S3 designation applied to an hourly service between Schaffhausen and St. Gallen Haggen, paired with the S8 as far as Romanshorn. Early proposals for the December 2013 relaunch of the St. Gallen S-Bahn network contemplated extending the S3 to Nesslau-Neu St. Johann and truncating the westbound S8 to Romanshorn. In the end, the S8 was extended to Nesslau-Neu St. Johann.

With the December 2013 change, the new S3 was introduced, running between St. Margrethen and Herisau. The December 2015 timetable change truncated this to St. Gallen, where it remained through 2021. The line was discontinued with the December 2021 timetable change, as the S5 was extended from St. Gallen to St. Margrethen.
