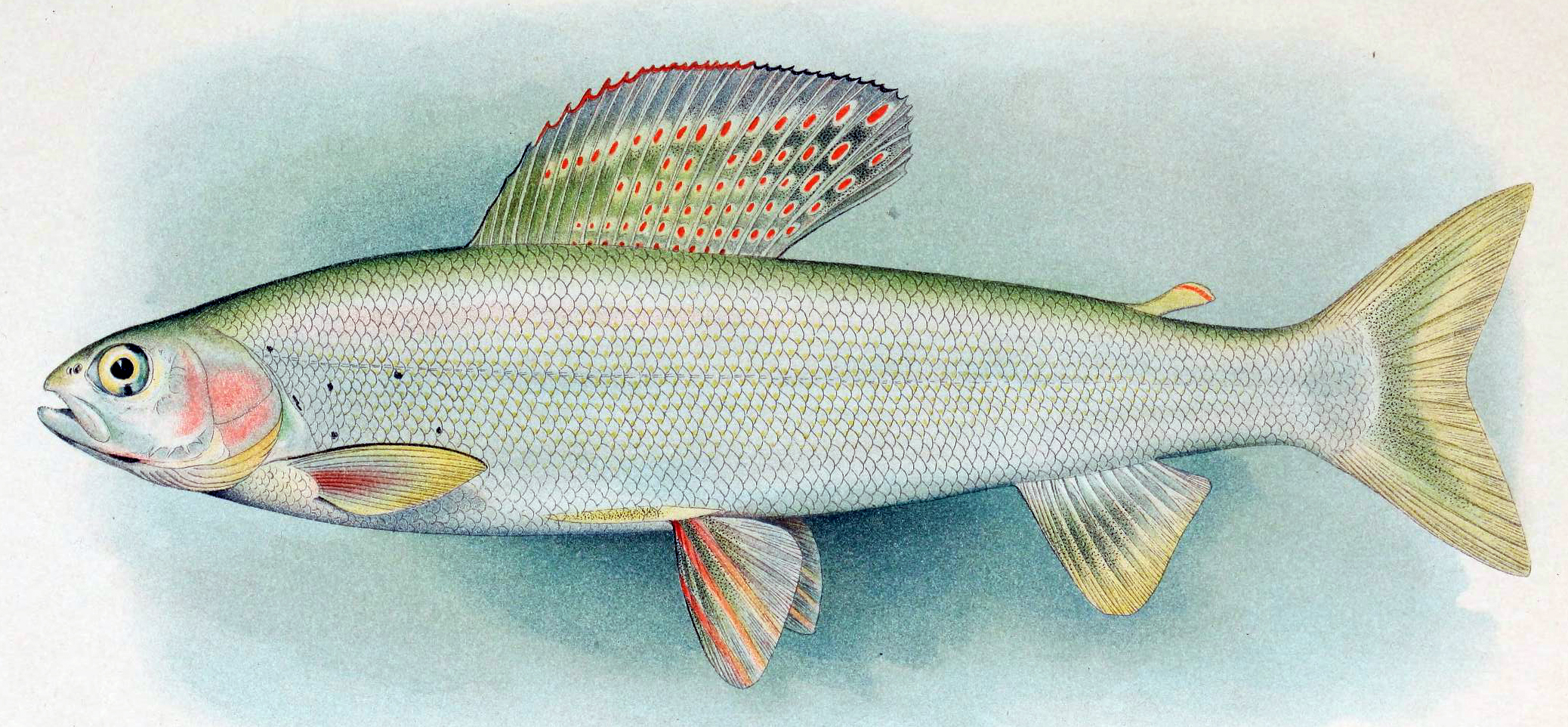
- Arctic grayling (Thymallus arcticus)

Scientific classification
- Kingdom: Animalia
- Phylum: Chordata
- Class: Actinopterygii
- Order: Salmoniformes
- Family: Salmonidae
- Subfamily: Thymallinae; Gill, 1885
- Genus: Thymallus; Linck, 1790

Type species
- Thymallus thymallus (Linnaeus, 1758)

Species
- See text

= Thymallus =

Thymallus Temporal range: Pleistocene to Present

Genus of fishes

Thymallus, commonly known as graylings, is a genus of freshwater ray-finned fish and the only genus within the subfamily Thymallinae of the family Salmonidae. Although all Thymallus species can be generically called graylings, without specific qualification the term "grayling" typically refers to the type species Thymallus thymallus, the European grayling.

== Name ==
The name of the genus Thymallus first given to grayling (T. thymallus) described in the 1758 edition of Systema Naturae by Swedish zoologist Carl Linnaeus originates from the faint smell of the herb thyme, which emanates from the flesh. Thymallus derives from the Greek θύμαλλος, "thyme smell".

== Species ==
There are 20 species placed in this genus. However, views differ on their taxonomic rank and according to FishBase, there are only 15 species.

- Thymallus aeliani Valenciennes, 1848 - Adriatic grayling
- Thymallus arcticus (Pallas, 1776) - Arctic grayling
- Thymallus baicalensis Dybowski, 1874 - Baikal black grayling
- Thymallus baicalolenensis Matveev, Samusenok, Pronin & Tel'pukhovsky, 2005
- Thymallus brevipinnis Svetovidov (ru), 1931 - Baikal white grayling
- Thymallus brevirostris Kessler, 1879 - Mongolian grayling
- Thymallus burejensis Antonov, 2004 - Bureya grayling
- Thymallus flavomaculatus Knizhin, Antonov & Weiss, 2006 - yellow-spotted grayling
- Thymallus grubii Dybowski, 1869 - Amur grayling
- Thymallus lenensis Knizhin, 2022
- Thymallus ligericus Persat, Weiss, Froufe, Secci-Petretto & Denys, 2019 - Loire grayling
- Thymallus mertensii Valenciennes, 1848 - Kamchatka grayling
- Thymallus nigrescens Dorogostaisky, 1923 - Kosogol grayling
- Thymallus nikolskyi Kaschenko, 1899
- Thymallus pallasii Valenciennes, 1848 - East Siberian grayling
- Thymallus signifer (Richardson, 1823)
- Thymallus svetovidovi Knizhin & Weiss, 2009 - Upper Yenisei grayling
- Thymallus thymallus (Linnaeus, 1758) - European grayling (type species)
- Thymallus tugarinae Knizhin, Antonov, Safronov & Weiss, 2007 - Lower Amur grayling
- Thymallus yaluensis T. Mori, 1928 - Yalu grayling

Incertae sedis

- Thymallus brevicephalis Mitrofanov, 1971

Modern reviews and the Catalog of Fishes also list additional species including Thymallus nikolskyi Kaschenko, 1899, Thymallus baicalolenensis Matveyev et al., 2005 and Thymallus ligericus Persat et al, 2019. An old controversy exists over the status of Baikal black vs white graylings, T. baicalensis and T. brevipinnis. Modern research supports the view that they are not separate taxa, but alternative ecological forms of T. baicalensis.

== Distribution ==
The fishes of this genus are native to the northern parts of the Palearctic and Nearctic realms, ranging from the United Kingdom and northern Europe across Eurasia to Siberia, as well as northern North America. T. thymallus, the grayling, is widespread in Europe, and T. arcticus, the Arctic grayling, is widespread throughout Eurasia east of the Ural Mountains and in the Nearctic. The other species have more localized ranges in northern Asia.

== Appearance ==
Thymallus species are distinguished from other members of the salmonid family by their larger scales, their small mouths with teeth on the maxillary bone, and most striking of all, their showy, sail-like dorsal fins. This fin is longer in males and highly colourful, with spots of red, orange, purple or green. The body is also colourful; the dorsal surface is a dark purplish to bluish black or gray, grading to dark blue or silver gray on the flanks and gray or white on the belly. The body is further decorated with a smattering of small dark spots; these are much more numerous in juveniles.

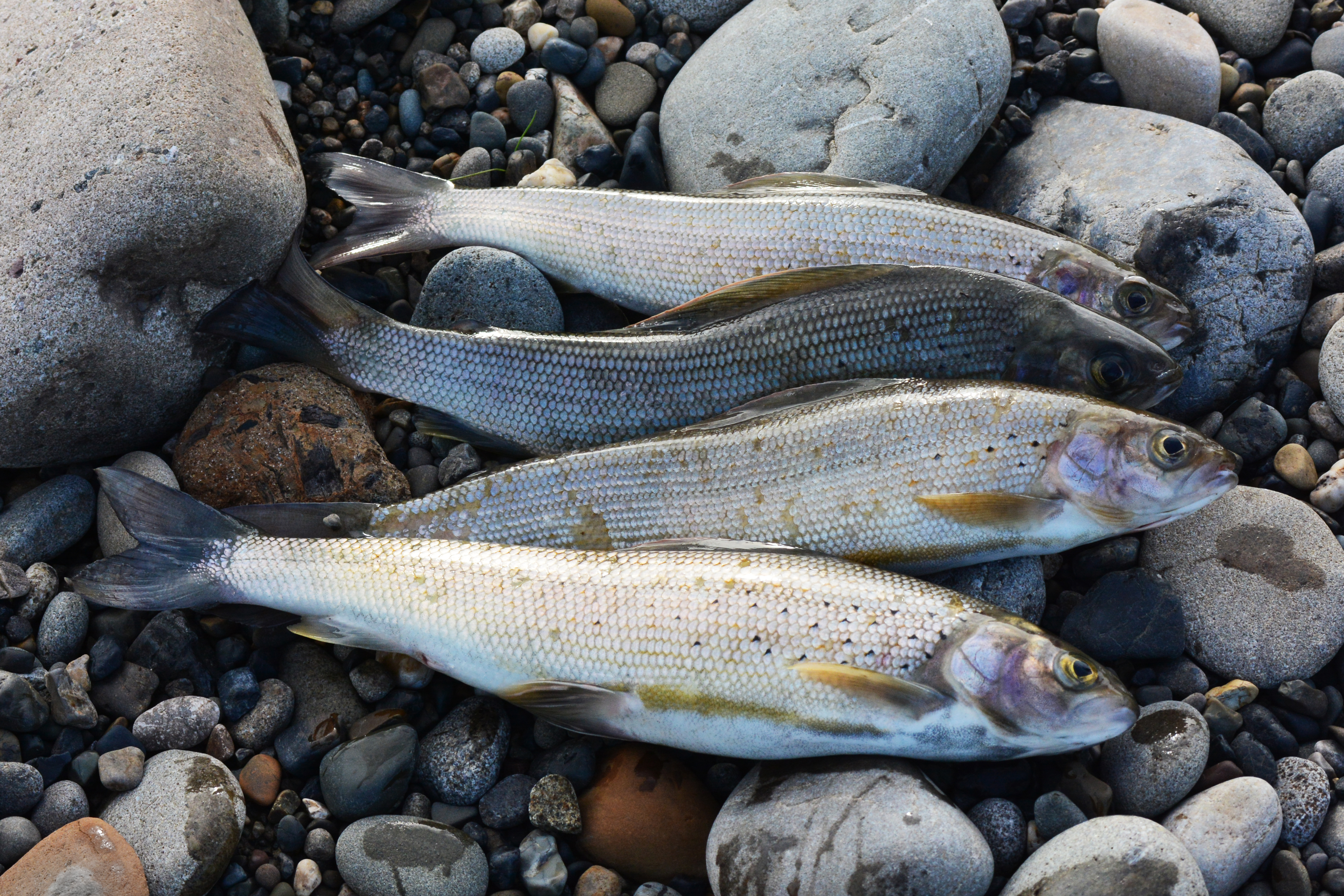
Four Arctic grayling (T. arcticus) from the Colville River of Alaska

The longest of the graylings is the Arctic grayling, T. arcticus, at a maximum length of 76 cm (30 in) and a maximum weight of 3.8 kg (8.4 lb). T. thymallus, while somewhat shorter - 60 cm (24 in) - may weigh significantly more, 6.7 kg (15 lb). The fishes of this genus may live for 18 years or more.

== Ecology and reproduction ==
These fishes require cool, well-oxygenated water, preferably with a swift current; they are found in large, sandy- or gravel-bottomed rivers and lakes, but T. thymallus may occasionally be found in brackish conditions. Generally omnivorous, they feed primarily on crustaceans, insects, and zooplankton.

The grayling species, typically for salmonids, spawn in rivers and do not guard their brood, although they do conceal their eggs in silt. The spawning behavior of the Arctic grayling may be typical for the genus Thymallus.

As they are highly sensitive to changes in water quality, Thymallus fishes may be considered indicator species; T. arcticus has largely disappeared from the Great Lakes Basin.

== Human use ==
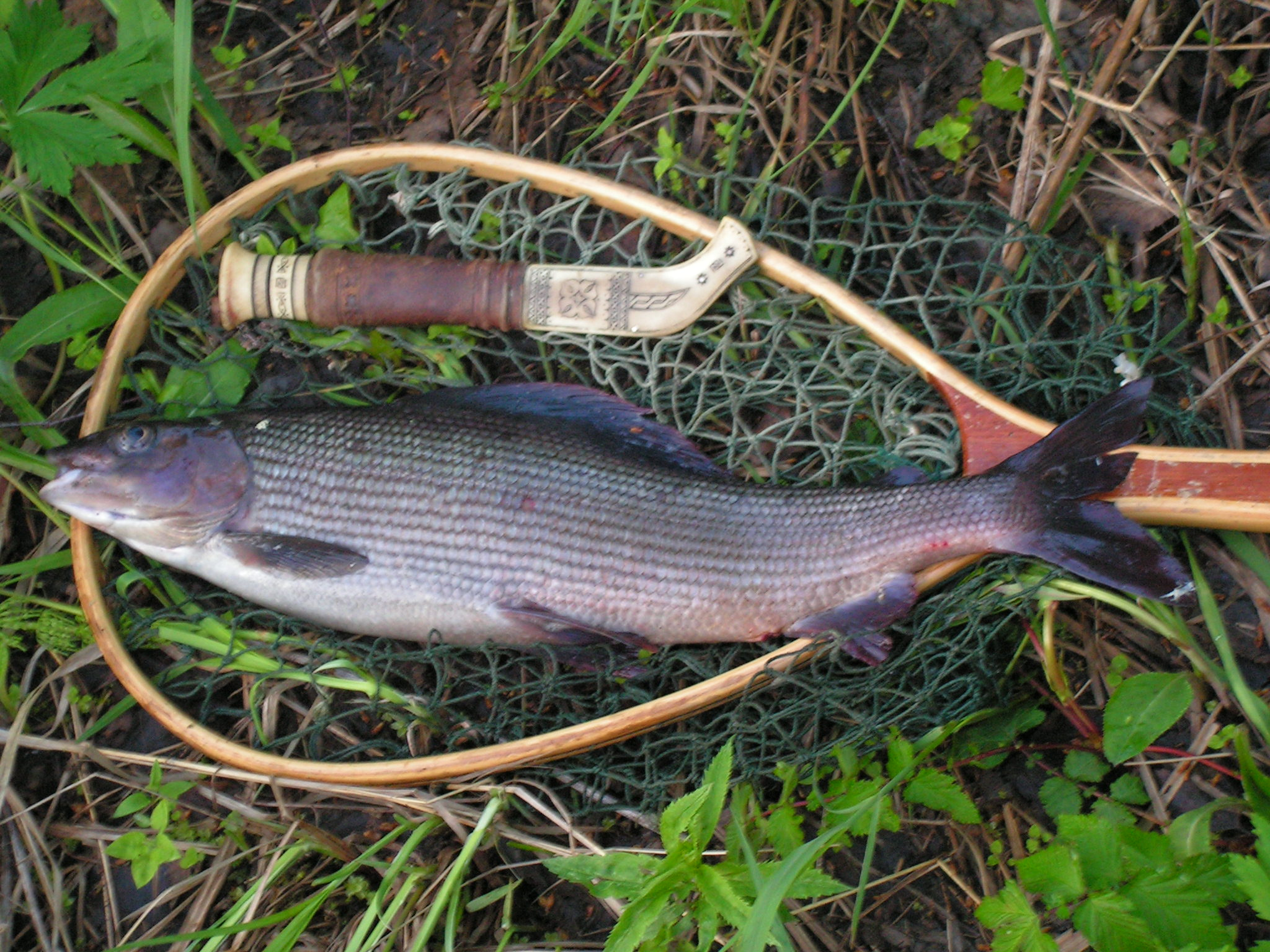
Catch of grayling (Thymallus thymallus), Lapland

Due to their agreeable taste and attractive form, the grayling species are valued as food and game fishes, and they are occasionally seen in public aquaria. The most economically important of these fishes, for which fisheries and aquaculture operations exist, are the grayling (T. thymallus) and the Arctic grayling (T. arcticus).
