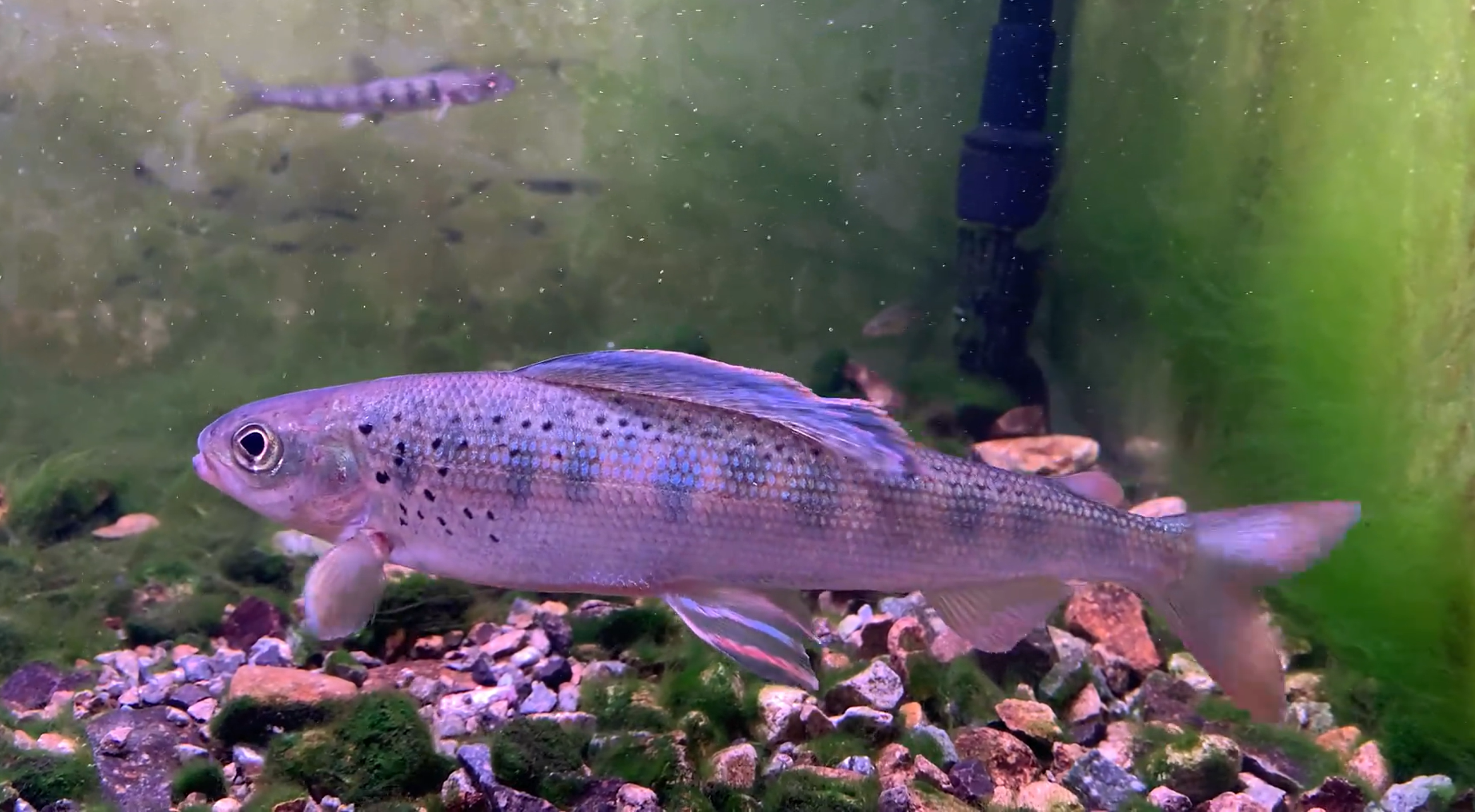
- In an aquarium

Scientific classification
- Kingdom: Animalia
- Phylum: Chordata
- Class: Actinopterygii
- Order: Salmoniformes
- Family: Salmonidae
- Genus: Thymallus
- Species: T. grubii

Binomial name
- Thymallus grubii Dybowski, 1869

= Amur grayling =

Species of fish

The Amur grayling (Thymallus grubii) is a species of freshwater ray-finned fish from the genus Thymallus (graylings) of the family Salmonidae, endemic to the Amur basin in Russian Far East and Northeast China and also the Onon and Kherlen basins in Mongolia. It is sometimes difficult to differentiate the species with the Lower Amur grayling (Thymallus tugarinae). It is seen as a game fish and food fish in Russian Far East and the Chinese Heilongjiang province.

== Description ==
The body of Amur grayling is usually dark, with its back being slightly purple. There are some small dark spots on the sides of the body. The edge of the dorsal fin is purplish red mixed with some spots. It can reach a maximum length of 31.3 cm.

== Life cycle ==
In winter, adult Amur grayling are found in deep parts of mountain streams. While in summer, they are usually found in clear streams flowing slowly with thick aquatic weeds. Most Amur grayling is feed on benthic organisms and insects. They form schools while breeding in clear, fast-flowing streams.

== See also ==
- Thymallus
- Thymallus arcticus
- Thymallus pallasii
