= Thymallus nigrescens =

Conservation status
- Not evaluated (IUCN 3.1)

Scientific classification
- Kingdom: Animalia
- Phylum: Chordata
- Class: Actinopterygii
- Order: Salmoniformes
- Family: Salmonidae
- Genus: Thymallus
- Species: T. nigrescens

Binomial name
- Thymallus nigrescens Dorogostaisky, 1923

Species of fish

Thymallus nigrescens, also known as the Hovsgol grayling, is a species of freshwater fish in the salmon family. It is endemic to the Mongolian Lake Khovsgol where they usually live near or on the bottom of the lake.

== Description ==
Hovsgol grayling can reach a recorded maximum length of 48.4 cm (19.1 in) while the average size varies between 17 and 20 cm (6.5 and 8 in). The species are omnivorous and mainly feed on plankton.
