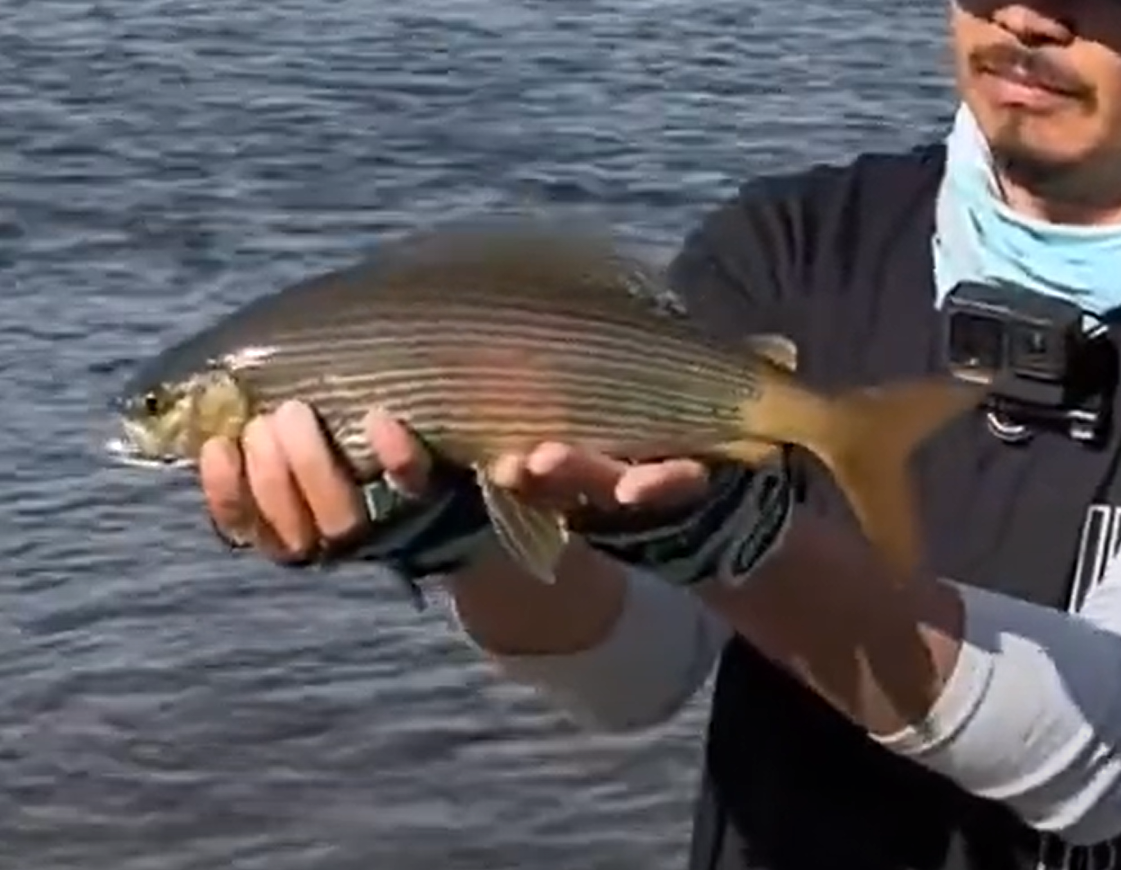
- Upper Yenisei grayling caught by an angler

Scientific classification
- Domain: Eukaryota
- Kingdom: Animalia
- Phylum: Chordata
- Class: Actinopterygii
- Order: Salmoniformes
- Family: Salmonidae
- Genus: Thymallus
- Species: T. svetovidovi

Binomial name
- Thymallus svetovidovi Knizhin & Weiss, 2009

= Upper Yenisei grayling =

Species of fish

Thymallus svetovidovi, also known as the Upper Yenisei grayling, is a species of freshwater fish in the salmon family. It is found in the upper reaches of the Yenisei River and in western Mongolia.

== Description ==
The body of Upper Yenisei grayling is mostly grayish-black, with dark dorsum and white abdomen. There are two weakly pronounced parallel brownish yellow stripes running from the throat to the ventral fins. Beyond gill cover to the insertion of the seventh unbranched ray of dorsal fin, eight small black spots of different shapes with a diameter of 1–3 mm are scattered.

The Upper Yenisei grayling can reach a maximum recorded length of 39.6 cm (15.6 inches).
