= Goldach Viaduct =

Railway bridge in Goldach, Switzerland

Goldach Viaduct Goldachviadukt
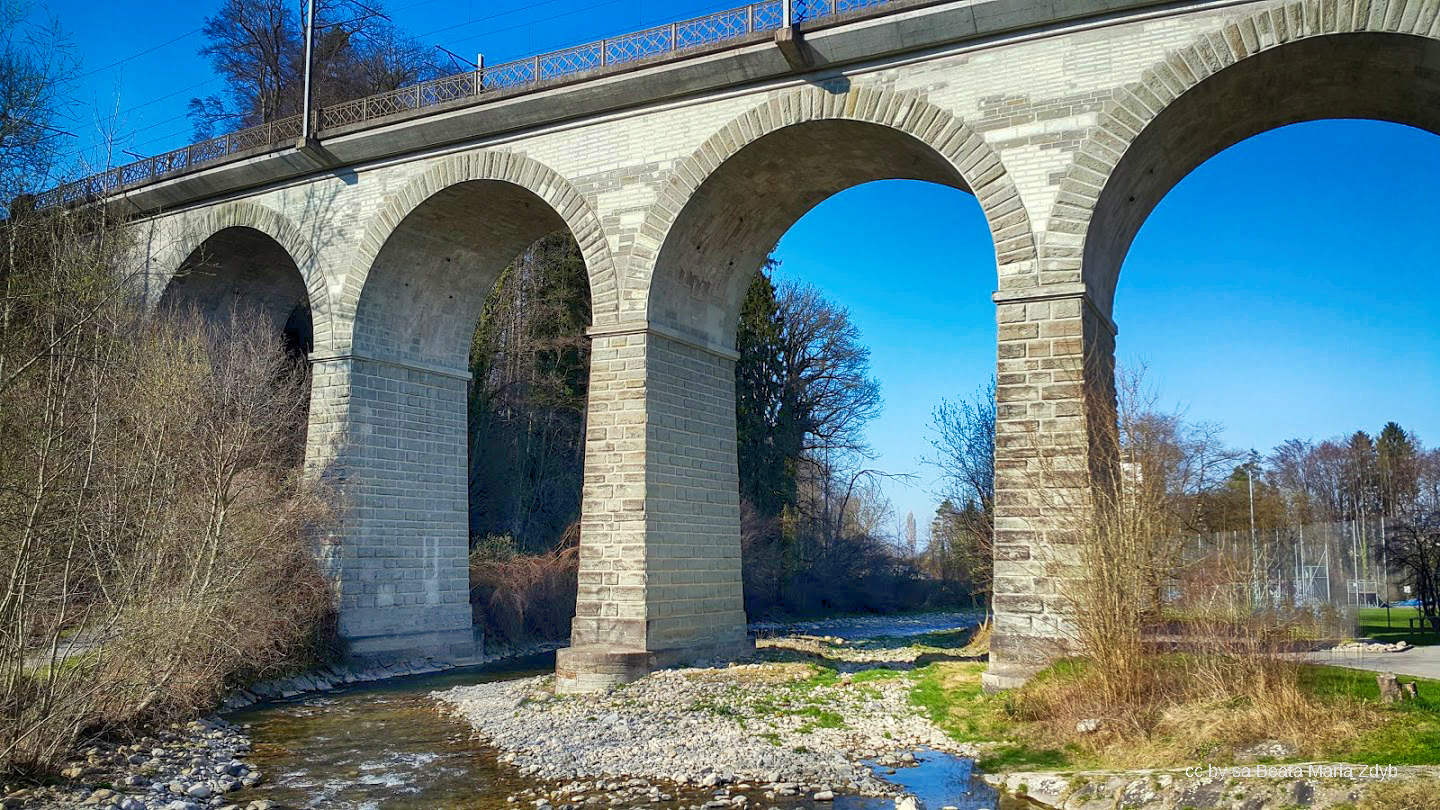
- The bridge in 2017
- Crosses: Goldach River
- Locale: Goldach, St. Gallen, Switzerland

Characteristics
- Material: Masonry
- Total length: 77 meters

History
- Architect: Georg Schöttle
- Construction end: 1856

The Goldach Viaduct (German: Goldachviadukt) is a 77-meter-long railway bridge in Goldach, Switzerland. It carries the Rorschach–St. Gallen railway line over the Goldach River. It is one of the oldest railway bridges in Switzerland.

== History ==
The Goldach Viaduct was built in 1856 and is one of the oldest railway bridges in Switzerland. The viaduct, featuring five semicircular arches, was built by Georg Schöttle following the plans of Karl von Etzel.
