= Distinct population segment =

Division of a taxonomic species under the U.S. Endangered Species Act

A distinct population segment (DPS) is the smallest division of a taxonomic species permitted to be protected under the U.S. Endangered Species Act. Species, as defined in the Act for listing purposes, is a taxonomic species or subspecies of plant or animal, or in the case of vertebrate species, a distinct population segment.

== Criteria for designation ==
The criteria for designation of a population or group of populations as a DPS was most recently articulated in a 1996 joint USFWS-NMFS policy (61 FR 4722: February 7, 1996):

Three elements are considered in a decision regarding the status of a possible DPS as endangered or threatened under the Act. These are applied similarly for addition to the lists of endangered and threatened wildlife and plants, reclassification, and removal from the lists:

1. Discreteness of the population segment in relation to the remainder of the species to which it belongs;
2. The significance of the population segment to the species to which it belongs; and
3. The population segment's conservation status in relation to the Act's standards for listing (i.e., is the population segment, when treated as if it were a species, endangered or threatened?).

=== Discreteness ===
A population segment of a vertebrate species may be considered discrete if it satisfies either one of the following conditions:

1. It is markedly separated from other populations of the same taxon as a consequence of physical, physiological, ecological, or behavioral factors. Quantitative measures of genetic or morphological discontinuity may provide evidence of this separation.
2. It is delimited by international governmental boundaries within which differences in control of exploitation, management of habitat, conservation status, or regulatory mechanisms exist that are significant in light of section 4(a)(1)(D) of the Act.

=== Significance ===
If a population segment is considered discrete under one or more of the above conditions, its biological and ecological significance will then be considered in light of Congressional guidance (see Senate Report 151, 96th Congress, 1st Session) that the authority to list DPSes be used "...sparingly" while encouraging the conservation of genetic diversity. In carrying out this examination, the Services [USFWS and NMFS] will consider available scientific evidence of the discrete population segment's importance to the taxon to which it belongs. This consideration may include, but is not limited to, the following:

1. Persistence of the discrete population segment in an ecological setting unusual or unique for the taxon,
2. Evidence that loss of the discrete population segment would result in a significant gap in the range of a taxon,
3. Evidence that the discrete population segment represents the only surviving natural occurrence of a taxon that may be more abundant elsewhere as an introduced population outside its historic range, or
4. Evidence that the discrete population segment differs markedly from other populations of the species in its genetic characteristics.

Because precise circumstances are likely to vary considerably from case to case, it is not possible to describe prospectively all the classes of information that might bear on the biological and ecological importance of a discrete population segment.

=== Status ===
If a population segment is discrete and significant (i.e., it is a distinct population segment) its evaluation for endangered or threatened status will be based on the Act's definitions of those terms and a review of the factors enumerated in section 4(a)of the Act. It may be appropriate to assign different classifications to different DPSes of the same vertebrate taxon.

== Priorities ==
The Fish and Wildlife Service's Listing and Recovery Priority Guidelines (48 FR 43098; September 21, 1983) generally afford DPSes the same consideration as subspecies, but when a subspecies and a DPS have the same numerical priority, the subspecies receives higher priority for listing. The Services will continue to generally accord subspecies higher priority than DPSes.

== Relationship to evolutionarily significant units (ESUs) ==
In consideration of Pacific salmon for listing under the Act, NMFS has relied on the evolutionarily significant unit (ESU) concept and previous developed a policy on the definition of species under the Act (56 FR 58612– 58618; November 20, 1991). The policy applies only to species of salmonids native to the Pacific. Under this policy, a stock of Pacific salmon is considered a DPS if it represents an evolutionarily significant unit (ESU) of a biological species. A stock must satisfy two criteria to be considered an ESU: (1) It must be substantially reproductively isolated from other conspecific population units; and (2) It must represent an important component in the evolutionary legacy of the species. The 1996 joint policy considers the 1991 NMFS policy on Pacific salmon to be consistent with the joint policy, being a detailed extension of it. The joint policy further states that NMFS will continue to exercise the 1991 policy with respect to Pacific salmonids.
