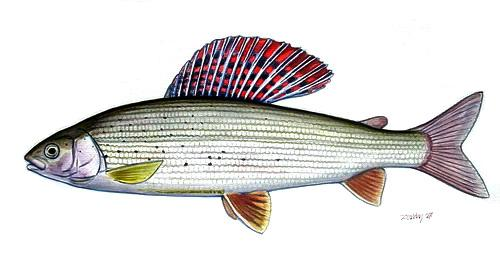

Conservation status
- Least Concern (IUCN 3.1)

Scientific classification
- Kingdom: Animalia
- Phylum: Chordata
- Class: Actinopterygii
- Division: Teleostei
- Order: Salmoniformes
- Family: Salmonidae
- Genus: Thymallus
- Species: T. thymallus

Binomial name
- Thymallus thymallus (Linnaeus, 1758)
- Range of T. thymallus Resident Extant & Introduced (resident)

= Thymallus thymallus =

Species of fish

Thymallus thymallus, the grayling or European grayling, is a species of freshwater fish in the salmon family Salmonidae. It is the only species of the genus Thymallus (the graylings) native to Europe, where it is widespread from the United Kingdom and France to the Ural Mountains in Russia, and Balkans on the south-east, but does not occur in the southern parts of the continent. It was introduced to Morocco in 1948, but it does not appear to have become established there.

== Description ==
The grayling grows to a maximum recorded length of 60 cm (24 in) and a maximum recorded weight of 6.7 kg (15 lb). Of typical Thymallus appearance, the grayling proper is distinguished from the similar Arctic grayling (T. arcticus arcticus) by the presence of 5–8 dorsal and 3–4 anal spines, which are absent in the other species; T. thymallus also has a smaller number of soft rays in these fins. Individuals of the species have been recorded as reaching an age of 14 years.

The grayling prefers cold, clean, running riverine waters, but also occurs in lakes and, exceptionally, in brackish waters around the Baltic Sea. Omnivorous, the fish feeds on vegetable matter, as well as crustaceans, insects and spiders, molluscs, zooplankton, and smaller fishes, such as Eurasian minnows. Grayling are also prey for larger fish, including the huchen (Hucho hucho).

With the Arctic grayling, T. thymallus is one of the economically important Thymallus species, being raised commercially and fished for sport.

The grayling is a protected species listed in Appendix III of the Bern Convention. It has become critically endangered in the Baltic Sea.

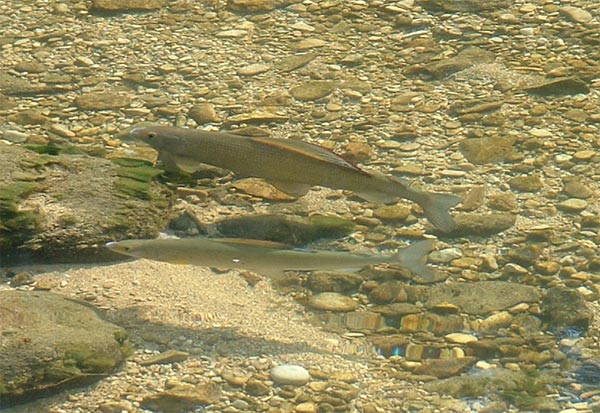
Spawning graylings

The term "grayling" is often used to refer generically to the Thymallus species, and T. thymallus is sometimes called the European grayling for clarity. There are many obsolete synonyms for the species.

Thymallus thymallus is the type species of its genus.

== Angling ==
The grayling is known as the 'lady of the stream'. In Europe, they used to be persecuted by anglers for the false perception that they stopped trout colonizing stretches of rivers and streams. However, research has shown that grayling and trout feed on different prey items and generally prefer different microhabitats within rivers and streams but do occupy similar niches to smaller, less-predatory trout.

In England and Wales, they can be fished throughout the coarse fishing season (16 June to 14 March), providing thrilling sport on the fly when the trout season is closed. There is no closed season for grayling in Scotland; where they have been introduced. There are no grayling in Ireland. Well-known grayling flies include the grayling witch, klinkhamers, various nymphs and 'red tags', along with other trout patterns. Flies tied to resemble small pink shrimps have also been found to be useful. A method known as 'Czech-nymphing' has been known to be helpful to anglers where grayling shoal up in colder periods. The method involves moving a series of Czech nymphs under the tip of the fly rod with the flow of the river and the nymphs should entice the grayling to take one. Fly-anglers may wade in the river to perform this method where they can access deeper water. Wading does not necessarily spook the grayling as they are generally less cautious than trout and are not as easily put off by human presence.

In France, too, the season is limited depending upon several factors. The Allier is one of the rare places in Southern Europe where the common grayling occurs in a natural habitat.
