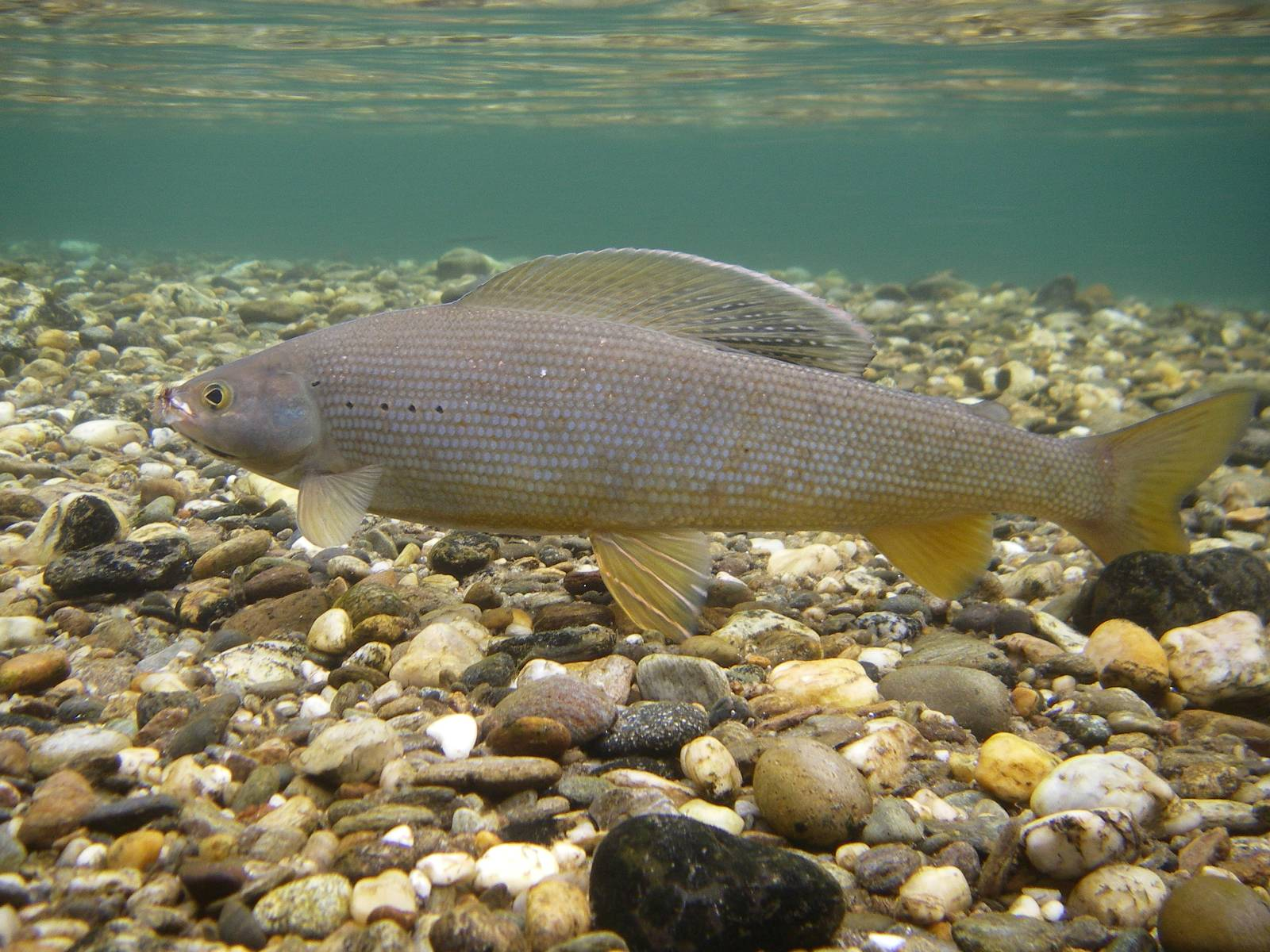

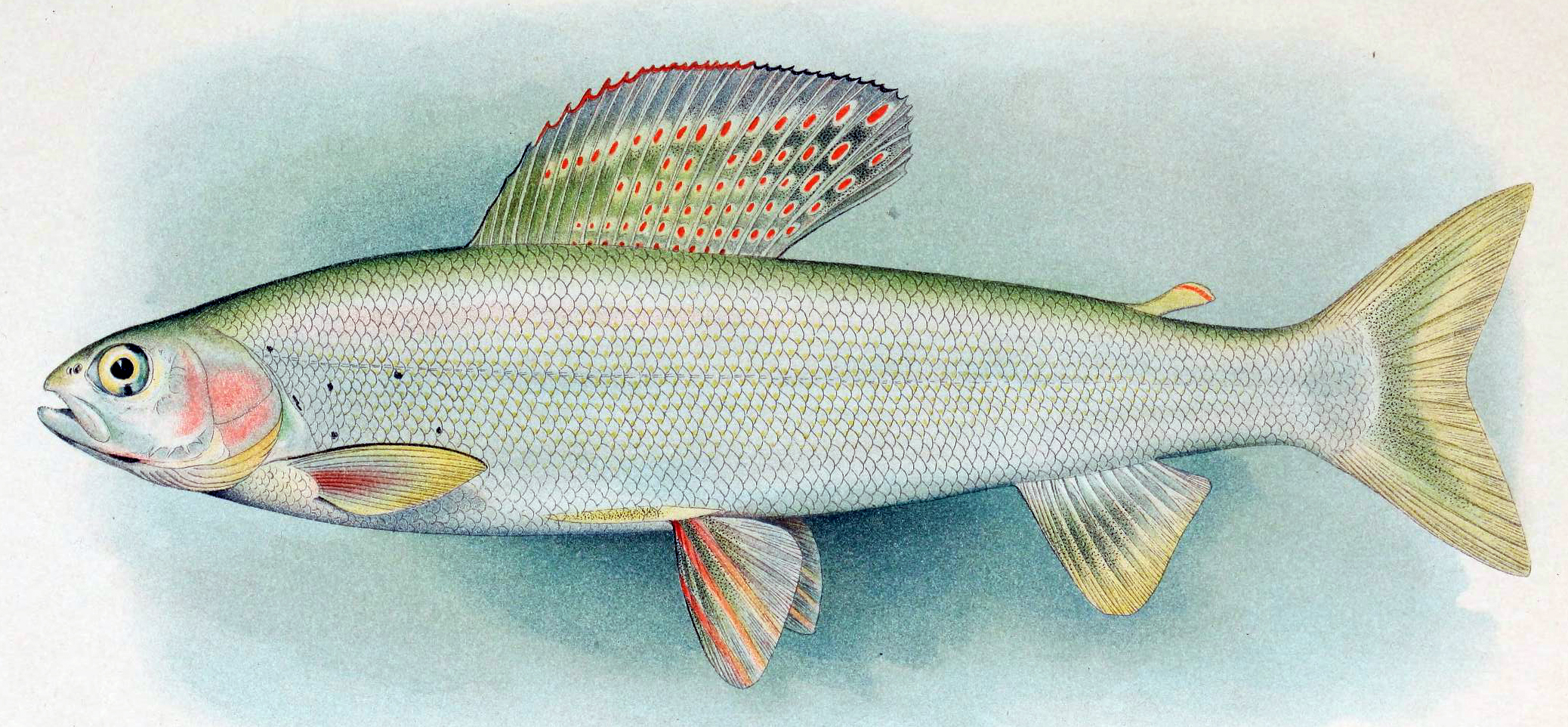

Conservation status
- Least Concern (IUCN 3.1)

Scientific classification
- Kingdom: Animalia
- Phylum: Chordata
- Class: Actinopterygii
- Division: Teleostei
- Order: Salmoniformes
- Family: Salmonidae
- Genus: Thymallus
- Species: T. arcticus

Binomial name
- Thymallus arcticus Pallas, 1776

Synonyms
- previous scientific names: Salmo arcticus (Pallas, 1776) Thymallus arcticus arcticus (Pallas, 1776) Coregonus signifer (Richardson, 1823) Salmo signifer (Richardson, 1823) Thymallus signifer (Richardson, 1823) Coregonus thymalloides (Richardson, 1823) Salmo thymalloides (Richardson, 1823) Thymalus ontariensis (Valenciennes, 1848) Thymallus tricolor (Cope, 1865) Thymallus signifer tricolor (Cope, 1865) Thymallus montanus (Milner, 1874) Thymallus tricolor montanus (Milner, 1874) Thymallus arcticus lenensis (Weiss, Knizhin, Kirillov & Froufe, 2006)

= Arctic grayling =

Species of fish

The Arctic grayling (Thymallus arcticus) is a species of freshwater fish in the salmon family Salmonidae. T. arcticus is widespread throughout the Arctic and Pacific drainages in Canada, Alaska, and Siberia, as well as the upper Missouri River drainage in Montana. In the U.S. state of Arizona, an introduced population is found in the Lee Valley and other lakes in the White Mountains. They were also stocked at Toppings Lake by the Teton Range and in lakes in the high Uinta Mountains in Utah, as well as alpine lakes of the Boulder Mountains (Idaho) in central Idaho.

== Taxonomy ==
The scientific name of the Arctic grayling is Thymallus arcticus. It was named in 1776 by German zoologist Peter Simon Pallas from specimens collected in Russia. The name of the genus Thymallus first given to grayling (T. thymallus) described in the 1758 edition of Systema Naturae by Swedish zoologist Carl Linnaeus originates from the faint smell of the herb thyme, which emanates from the flesh.

== Description ==
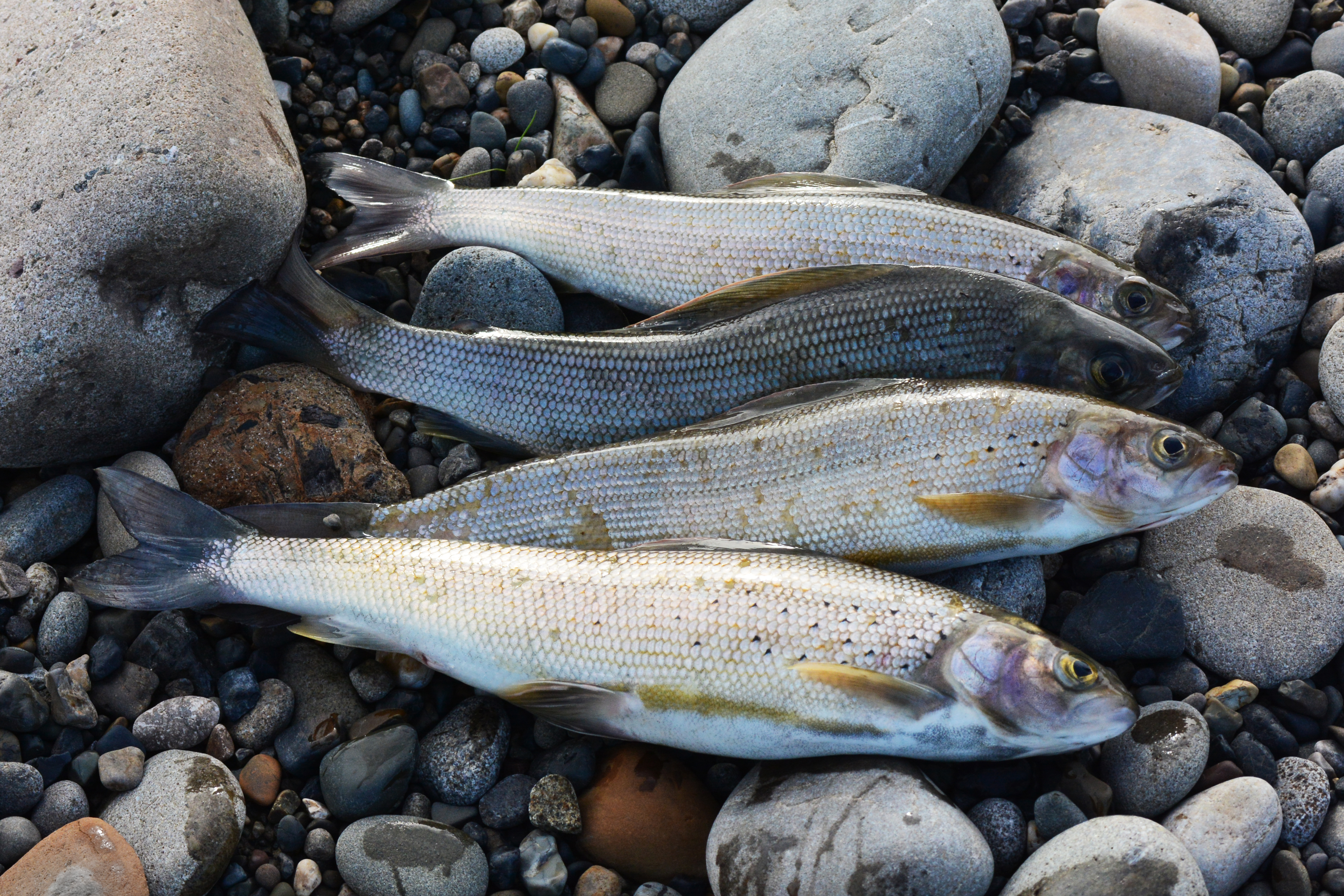
Arctic grayling caught in the Colville River of Alaska

Arctic grayling grow to a maximum recorded length of 76 cm (30 in) and a maximum recorded weight of 3.8 kg (8.4 lb). Of typical thymalline appearance, the Arctic grayling is distinguished from the similar European grayling (T. thymallus) by the absence of dorsal and anal spines and by the presence of a larger number of soft rays in these fins,and also having a larger mouth. There is a dark midlateral band between the pectoral and pelvic fins, and the flanks may possess a pink iridescence. T. a. arcticus has been recorded as reaching an age of 18 years.

== Range ==
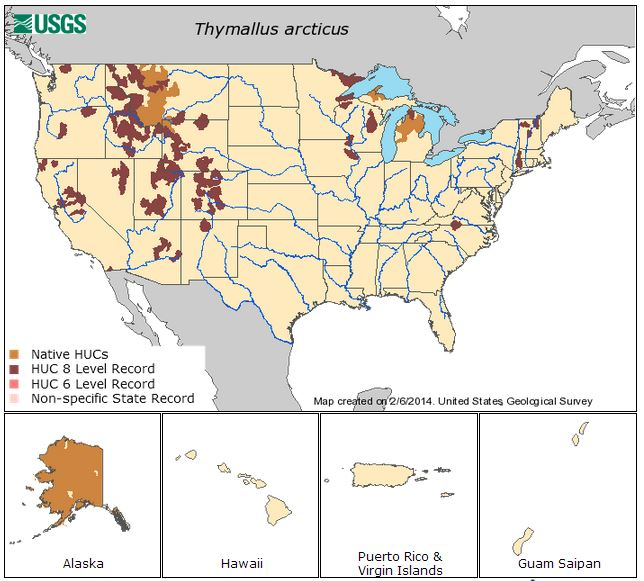
Native and introduced range of Arctic grayling, Thymallus arcticus in U.S.

Arctic grayling are widespread in Arctic Ocean drainages from Hudson Bay, Canada to Alaska and in Arctic and Pacific drainages to central Alberta and British Columbia in Canada. They do not occur naturally in the Fraser and Columbia river basins. There are remnant native populations of fluvial Arctic grayling in the upper Missouri River drainage in the Big Hole River and Red Rock basin ("Montana Arctic grayling"). Fluvial Arctic grayling have been reestablished in the upper Ruby River, a tributary of the Beaverhead River. The native range formerly extended south into the Great Lakes basin in Michigan, where the species was extirpated by 1936 due to habitat destruction, unregulated logging, and competition from non-native fish species.

The arctic grayling occurs naturally in the Arctic Ocean basin in Siberia from the Ob to Yenisei drainages and in European Russia in some tributaries of Pechora river. Lake dwelling forms of Arctic grayling have been introduced in suitable lake habitats throughout the Rocky Mountains including lakes in the Teton Range in Wyoming, central Idaho and the high Uinta Mountains in Utah, Cascade Mountains and Sierra Nevada Mountains as far south as Arizona.

== Life cycle ==
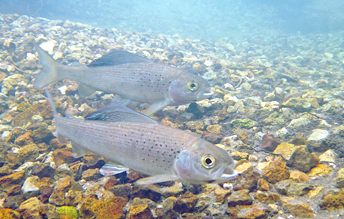
Arctic grayling spawning

Several life history forms of Arctic grayling occur: fluvial populations that live and spawn in rivers; lacustrine populations that live and spawn in lakes; and potamodromous populations that live in lakes and spawn in tributary streams.

The Arctic grayling occurs primarily in cold waters of mid-sized to large rivers and lakes, returning to rocky streams to breed. The various subspecies are omnivorous. Crustaceans, insects and insect larvae, and fish eggs form the most important food items. Larger specimens of T. arcticus become piscivorous and the immature fish feed on zooplankton and insect larvae.

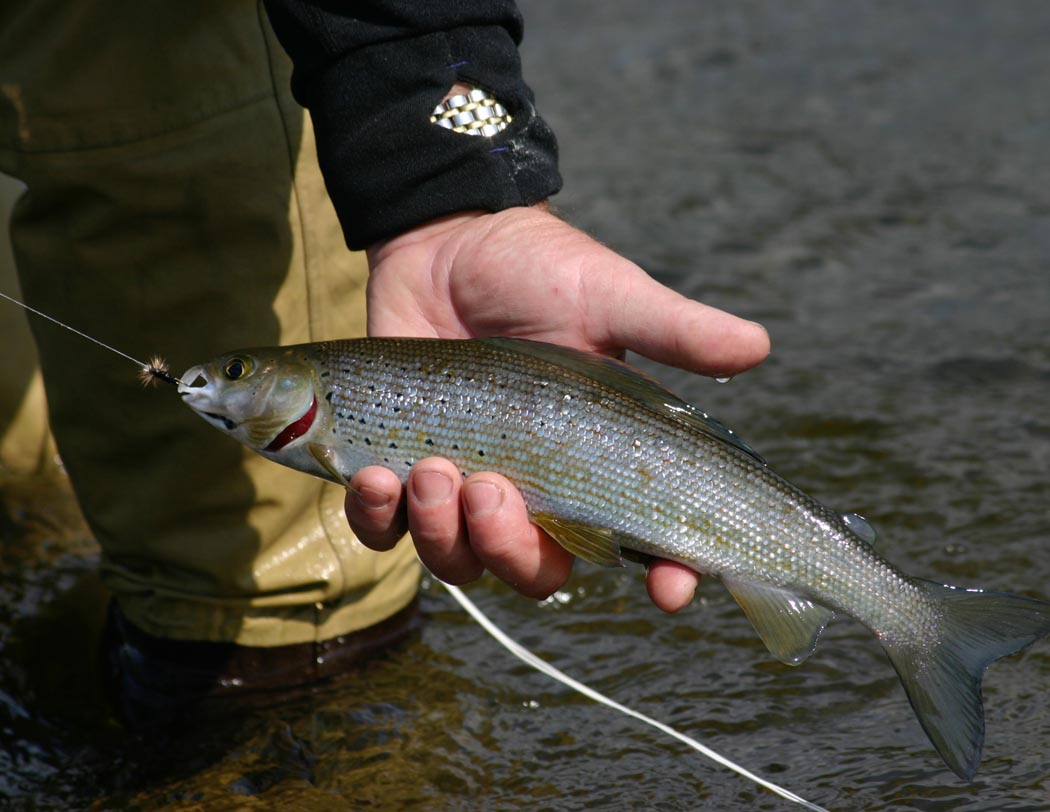
10 in (25 cm) Arctic grayling from the Gulkana River, Paxson, Alaska.

Spawning takes place in the spring. Adult fish seek shallow areas of rivers with fine, sand substrate and moderate current. Males are territorial and court females by flashing their colourful dorsal fins; the fins are also used to brace receptive females during the vibratory release of milt and roe. The fish are nonguarders: the eggs are left to mix with the substrate. Although the Arctic grayling does not excavate a nest, the highly energetic courtship and mating tends to kick up fine material which covers the zygotes. The zygote is small (approximately 3 mm or 0.1 in in diameter) and the embryo will hatch after two to three weeks. The newly hatched embryo remains in the substrate until all the yolk has been absorbed. They emerge at a length of around 12 to 18 mm (0.5 to 0.7 in), at which time they form shoals at the river margins. The juveniles grow quickly during their first two years of life.

== Conservation ==
Arctic grayling are considered a secure species throughout their range. Although some populations at the southern extent of its native range have been extirpated, it remains widespread elsewhere and is not listed on the IUCN Red List of threatened species.

The fluvial population in the upper Missouri river basin once merited a high priority for listing under the Endangered Species Act (ESA) by the US Fish & Wildlife Service (FWS). This unique southernmost population is now extirpated from all areas of the basin with the exception of the Big Hole River watershed. In preparation for an ESA listing, the US FWS began implementing a "Candidate Conservation Agreement with Assurances" (CCAA). This agreement protects cooperating landowners from being prosecuted under the ESA "takings" clause so long as they fulfill specific obligations, spelled out in a contractual arrangement and intended to restore the dwindling population. Finally, in 2014 the FWS determined not to list the grayling under ESA, due to the effectiveness of the CCAA.

In 2025, efforts to reintroduce Arctic grayling to Michigan streams began, with 400,000 eggs planted in coldwater streams as part of a collaborative restoration initiative.

The Arctic grayling is economically important; it is a "key subsistence species" for the Iñupiat people of the Alaska North Slope, it is raised commercially for food and it is one of the most important species for sport fishing in Alaska.

== Notes ==
Citations

Sources

- Froese, Rainer; Pauly, Daniel (eds.). "Thymallus arcticus". FishBase. February 2012 version.
- FWS (2004). U.S. Fish and Wildlife Service Species Assessment and Listing Priority Assignment Form for fluvial Arctic grayling (distinct population segment of the Upper Missouri River), commonly called Montana Arctic grayling. November 30, 2004.
