= Flawil =

- Municipality
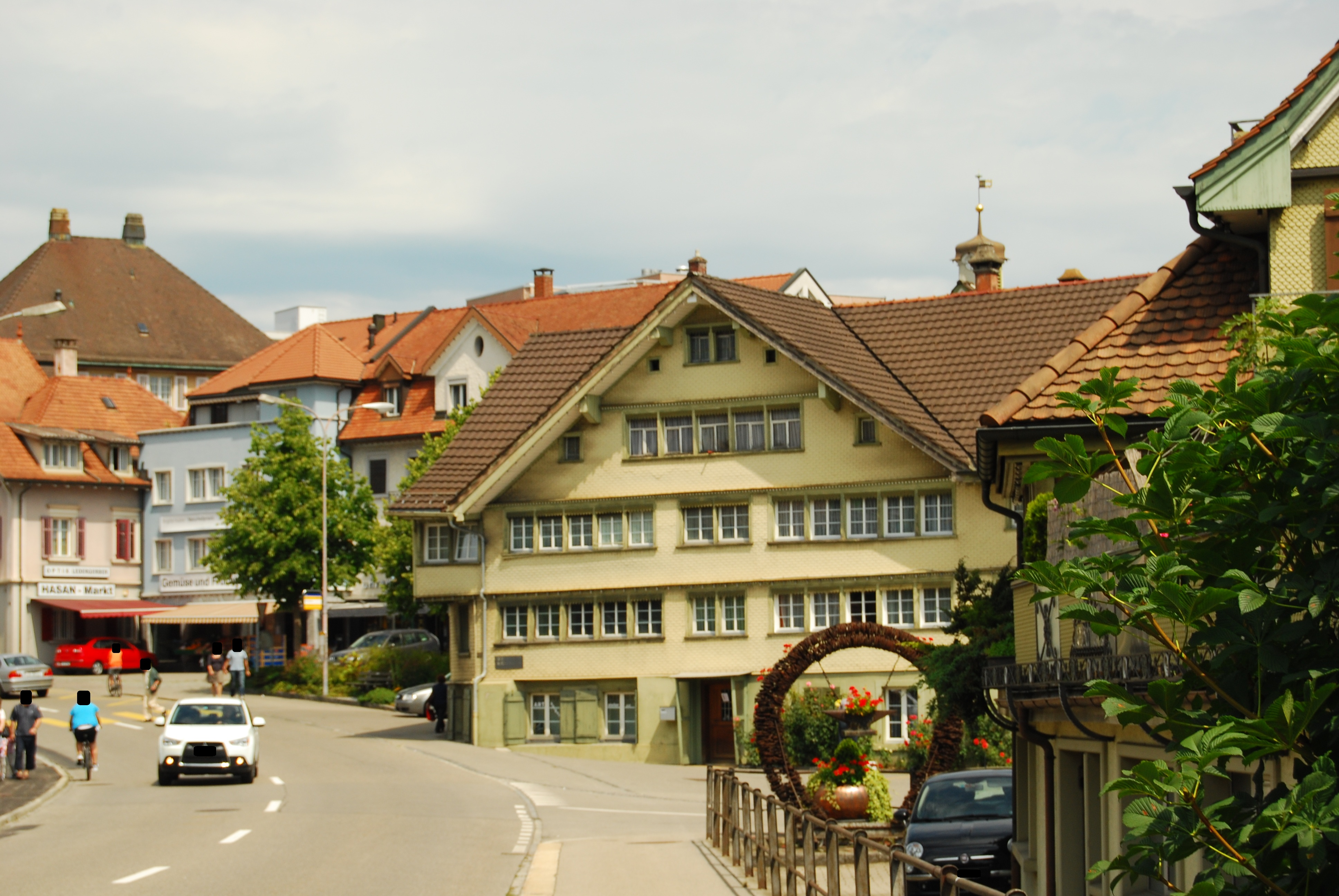

- Flag Coat of arms
- Location of Flawil
- Location within Switzerland Location within Canton of St. Gallen
- Coordinates: 47°25′N 9°12′E
- Country: Switzerland
- Canton: St. Gallen
- District: Wil

Government
  - Mayor: Rolf Claude (as of 2024)

Area
  - Total: 11.51 km^{2} (4.44 sq mi)
- Elevation: 610 m (2,000 ft)

Population (December 2020)
  - Total: 10,510
  - Density: 913.1/km^{2} (2,365/sq mi)
- Time zone: UTC+01:00 (CET)
  - Summer (DST): UTC+02:00 (CEST)
- Postal code: 9230
- SFOS number: 3402
- ISO 3166 code: CH-SG
- Surrounded by: Degersheim, Gossau, Herisau (AR), Oberbüren, Oberuzwil
- Twin towns: Isny (Germany)
- Website: www.flawil.ch

Flawil is a municipality in the canton of St. Gallen in Switzerland with slightly over 10,000 inhabitants.

It is the regional centre of Untertoggenburg, but belongs to the Wahlkreis (constituency) of Wil.

== History ==
Flawil is first mentioned in 858 as Flawilare marcho. Several of the surrounding hamlets were also mentioned in about the same era. Alterswil was first mentioned in 858 as Altiricheswilae, Oberglatt in 731 as villa Clata and in 1316 as Obren Glat and Burgau in 964 as Purchouva.

== Geography ==
Aerial view from 100 m by Walter Mittelholzer (1920)

Flawil has an area, as of 2006, of 11.5 km^{2} (4.4 sq mi). Of this area, 53.1% is used for agricultural purposes, while 22.6% is forested. Of the rest of the land, 23% is settled (buildings or roads) and the remainder (1.3%) is non-productive (rivers or lakes).

The municipality is located in the Wil Wahlkreis. It was the capital of the earlier Bezirk. To the north-east it is bordered by the Wissbach valley and the Glatt river. It consists of the extended linear village of Flawil and the hamlets of Botsberg, Alterswil, Grobenentschwil, Langenentschwil, Raschberg, Egg, Oberglatt and Burgau as well as scattered farm houses.

== Coat of arms ==
The blazon of the municipal coat of arms is Chequy Argent and Gules and a Chief Or.

== Demographics ==
Flawil has a population (as of 31 December 2020) of 10,510. As of 2007, about 26.5% of the population was made up of foreign nationals. Of the foreign population, (as of 2000), 138 are from Germany, 516 are from Italy, 964 are from ex-Yugoslavia, 64 are from Austria, 138 are from Turkey, and 516 are from another country. Over the last 10 years the population has grown at a rate of 4.2%. Most of the population (as of 2000) speaks German (84.5%), with Italian being second most common ( 3.4%) and Serbo-Croatian being third ( 3.4%). Of the Swiss national languages (as of 2000), 7,872 speak German, 27 people speak French, 313 people speak Italian, and 10 people speak Romansh.

The age distribution, as of 2000, in Flawil is; 1,216 children or 13.0% of the population are between 0 and 9 years old and 1,248 teenagers or 13.4% are between 10 and 19. Of the adult population, 1,209 people or 13.0% of the population are between 20 and 29 years old. 1,514 people or 16.2% are between 30 and 39, 1,279 people or 13.7% are between 40 and 49, and 1,127 people or 12.1% are between 50 and 59. The senior population distribution is 790 people or 8.5% of the population are between 60 and 69 years old, 548 people or 5.9% are between 70 and 79, there are 333 people or 3.6% who are between 80 and 89, and there are 56 people or 0.6% who are between 90 and 99.

In 2000 there were 1,198 persons (or 12.9% of the population) who were living alone in a private dwelling. There were 1,951 (or 20.9%) persons who were part of a couple (married or otherwise committed) without children, and 5,350 (or 57.4%) who were part of a couple with children. There were 491 (or 5.3%) people who lived in single parent home, while there are 55 persons who were adult children living with one or both parents, 43 persons who lived in a household made up of relatives, 51 who lived household made up of unrelated persons, and 181 who are either institutionalized or live in another type of collective housing.

In the 2007 federal election the most popular party was the SVP which received 31.9% of the vote. The next three most popular parties were the FDP (19.9%), the CVP (16.6%) and the SP (15%).

The entire Swiss population is generally well educated. In Flawil about 64.7% of the population (between age 25-64) have completed either non-mandatory upper secondary education or additional higher education (either university or a Fachhochschule). Out of the total population in Flawil, as of 2000, the highest education level completed by 2,070 people (22.2% of the population) was Primary, while 3,308 (35.5%) have completed Secondary, 854 (9.2%) have attended a Tertiary school, and 520 (5.6%) are not in school. The remainder did not answer this question.

The historical population is given in the following table:

year	population
1837	2,233
1850	2,664
1890	4,878
1900	4,873
1950	6,502
2000	9,320
2016	10,505

== Transportation ==
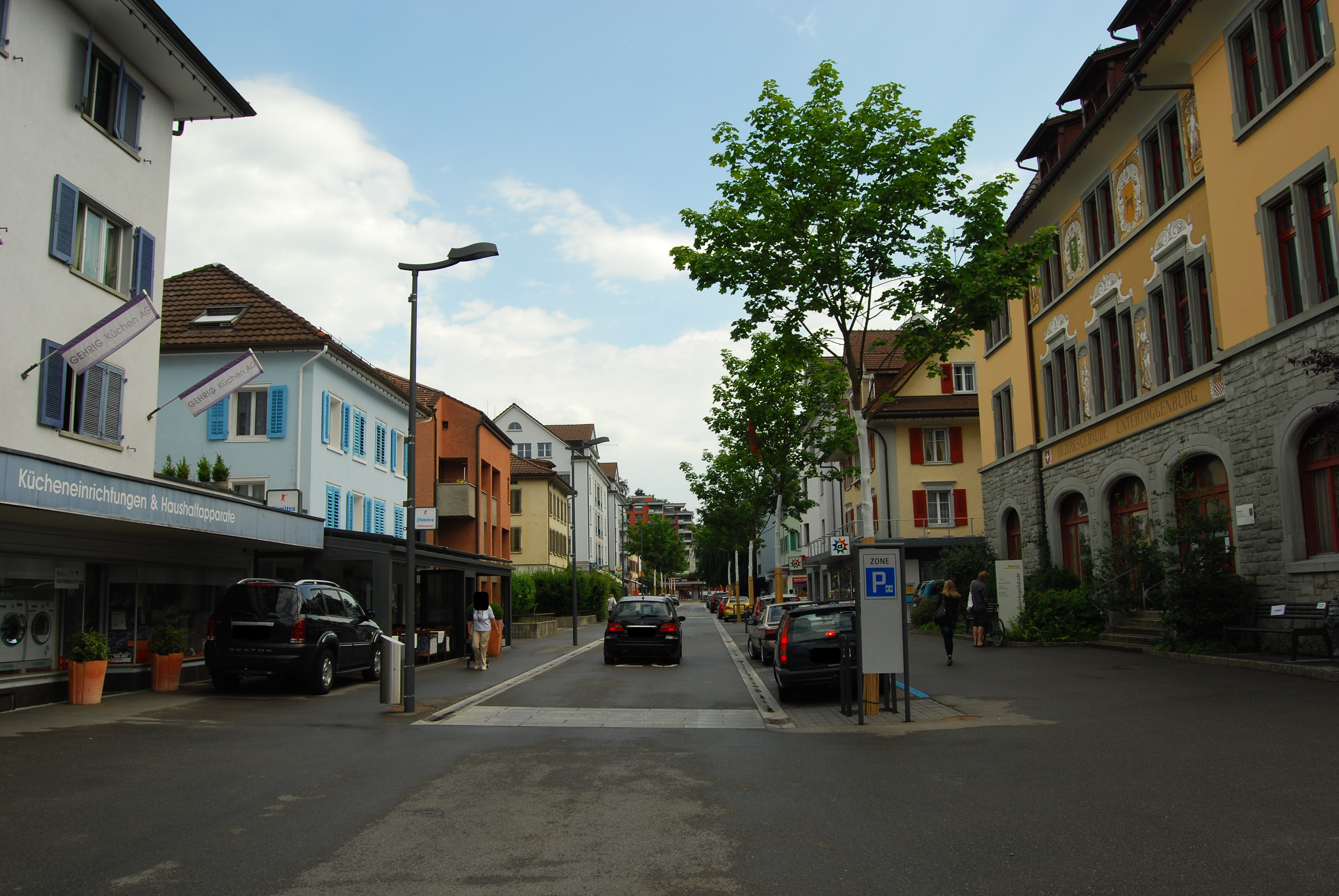
Flawil - Bahnhofstrasse

Flawil has a train station, with half-hourly long-distance train service in the direction of Zürich and St.Gallen. The ride takes exactly one hour to Zurich and 15 minutes to St.Gallen (as of 2008). Additionally, there are local commuter trains.

The next access to the A1 national motorway are located in neighbouring towns Gossau and Uzwil

== Heritage sites of national significance ==
The Old Town Council building German: Altes Rathaus in Burgau and the Hotel-Restaurant Hirschen German: Gasthof Hirschen in Oberglatt are listed as Swiss heritage sites of national significance.

The hamlets of Burgau, Raaschberg and Oberglatt are designated as part of the Inventory of Swiss Heritage Sites.

== Economy ==
The local economy used to be strongly based on industry, which has been declining, however. It is particularly known for the production of Swiss chocolate, in particular the Maestrani, Munz and Minor brands. Further industrial firms include FLAWA AG, producing cotton wool products and bandage material, SFS intec AG, specialised in deep drawing and impact extrusion, and BÜCHI Laboratory Equipment.

As of 2007, Flawil had an unemployment rate of 2.69%. As of 2005, there were 113 people employed in the primary economic sector and about 44 businesses involved in this sector. 1,705 people are employed in the secondary sector and there are 104 businesses in this sector. 1,896 people are employed in the tertiary sector, with 276 businesses in this sector.

As of October 2009 the average unemployment rate was 4.7%. There were 428 businesses in the municipality of which 111 were involved in the secondary sector of the economy while 278 were involved in the third.

As of 2000 there were 2,199 residents who worked in the municipality, while 2,571 residents worked outside Flawil and 1,648 people commuted into the municipality for work.

== Healthcare ==
Flawil has a cantonal hospital.

== Religion ==
Major religious activity is found in the Roman-Catholic parish St.Laurentius and the Protestant church. Additionally there are numerous smaller churches, including a Methodist community.

From the 2000 census, 4,295 or 46.1% are Roman Catholic, while 2,755 or 29.6% belonged to the Swiss Reformed Church. Of the rest of the population, there is 1 individual who belongs to the Christian Catholic faith, there are 420 individuals (or about 4.51% of the population) who belong to the Orthodox Church, and there are 190 individuals (or about 2.04% of the population) who belong to another Christian church. There are 4 individuals (or about 0.04% of the population) who are Jewish, and 666 (or about 7.15% of the population) who are Islamic. There are 168 individuals (or about 1.80% of the population) who belong to another church (not listed on the census), 506 (or about 5.43% of the population) belong to no church, are agnostic or atheist, and 315 individuals (or about 3.38% of the population) did not answer the question.

== Weather ==
Flawil has an average of 146.8 days of rain or snow per year and on average receives 1,280 mm (50 in) of precipitation. The wettest month is August during which time Flawil receives an average of 149 mm (5.9 in) of rain or snow. During this month there is precipitation for an average of 13.3 days. The month with the most days of precipitation is May, with an average of 14.2, but with only 136 mm (5.4 in) of rain or snow. The driest month of the year is October with an average of 76 mm (3.0 in) of precipitation over 13.3 days.

== Notable people ==
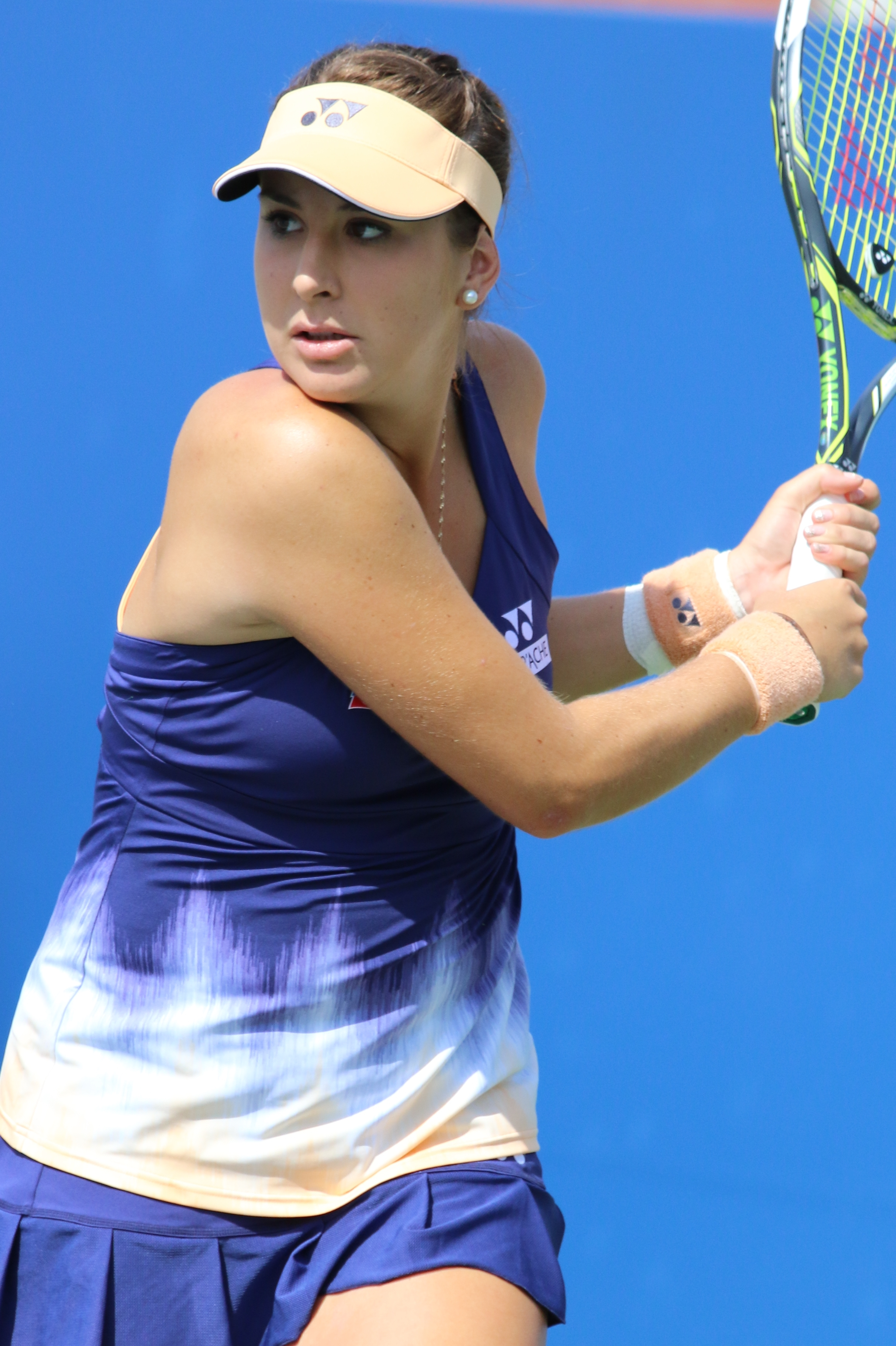
Belinda Bencic, 2016

- Anton Weibel (1941), a Swiss former footballer, 13 caps for the Switzerland national team
- Jost Gross (1946–2005), a lawyer and Swiss politician, sat on the Swiss National Council
- Balthasar Bickel (born 1965), a Swiss linguist at the University of Zurich, specializing in linguistic typology and Tibeto-Burman languages
- Mathias Seger (born 1977), a Swiss former professional ice hockey defenceman
- Manuela Zehnder (born 1983), a former professional squash player, lives in Flawil
- Thomas Schmid (born 1995), a Swiss rally driver
- Gino Mäder (1997–2023), road and track cyclist
- Belinda Bencic (born 1997 in Flawil), a Swiss professional tennis player
