= Wil (Wahlkreis) =

Coordinates: 47°28′N 9°03′E

Wil Wahlkreis Wil
- Constituency
- Country: Switzerland
- Canton: St. Gallen

Area
  - Total: 145.29 km^{2} (56.10 sq mi)

Population (December 2020)
  - Total: 76,439
  - Density: 526.11/km^{2} (1,362.6/sq mi)
- Time zone: UTC+1 (CET)
  - Summer (DST): UTC+2 (CEST)
- Municipalities: 10

Wil is a district of the Canton of St. Gallen, Switzerland. It is named after the regional centre Wil, which is the largest city of the district. The district capital is Wil.

== Demographics ==
The Wil District had a population of 76,439 as of 31 December 2020. Of the foreign population as of 2000, 947 were from Germany, 2,336 were from Italy, 6,127 were from ex-Yugoslavia, 439 were from Austria, 820 were from Turkey, and 2,029 were from other countries. Also as of 2000, 58,596 people spoke German, 196 people spoke French, 1,494 people spoke Italian, and 81 people spoke Romansh.

The age distribution as of 2000 in the Wil district was: 8,617 (13.0%) were 0–9 years old; 9,137 (13.8%) were 10–19; 8,318 people (12.5%) were 20–29 years old; 10,883 people (16.4%) were 30–39; 9,599 people (14.5%) were 40–49; and 8,018 people (12.1%) were 50–59. The population distribution above 60 years of age was: 5,433 (8.2%) were 60–69; 3,908 people (5.9%) were 70–79; 2,102 people (3.2% ) were 80–89; 330 people (0.5%) were aged 90–99; and 5 people were aged 100 or over.

In 2000 there were 8,002 people (12.1% of the population) who were living alone in a private dwelling. There were 14,333 (21.6%) people who were part of a couple (married or otherwise committed) without children, and 37,617 (56.7%) who were part of a couple with children. There were 3,380 (5.1%) people who lived in single parent home, while there were 399 people who were adult children living with one or both parents. 269 people lived in a household made up of relatives, 444 lived in households made up of unrelated people, and 1,906 were either institutionalized or lived in another type of collective housing.

Out of the total population in Region Wil, as of 2000, the highest education level completed by 13,989 people (21.1% of the population) was Primary, while 24,675 people (37.2%) completed Secondary. 7,191 people (10.8%) attended a Tertiary school, and 2,931 people (4.4%) did not attend school. The remainder did not answer this question.

== Economy ==
As of October 2009, the average unemployment rate was 4.1%.

== Religion ==
From the 2000 census, 34,670 people (about 52.3% of the population) are Roman Catholic, while 17,313 people (26.1%) belong to the Swiss Reformed Church. Of the rest of the population, 1,946 people (2.93%) belong to the Orthodox Church, 1,617 people (2.44%) belong to another Christian church, and 15 people (0.02%) belong to the Christian Catholic faith. In addition, there are 4,195 people (6.32%) who are Islamic, 460 people (0.69%) who belong to another church (not listed on the census), and 17 people (0.03%) who are Jewish. 4,050 people (6.10%) do not belong to any church and are agnostic or atheist, and 2,067 individuals (about 3.12% of the population) did not answer the question.

== Municipalities ==
Coat of arms	Municipality	Population (31 December 2020)	Area in km^{2}	SFOS number
Degersheim	Degersheim	4,099	14.49	3401
Flawil	Flawil	10,510	11.51	3402
Jonschwil	Jonschwil	3,873	10.99	3405
Niederbüren	Niederbüren	1,507	15.92	3422
Niederhelfenschwil	Niederhelfenschwil	3,181	16.23	3423
Oberbüren	Oberbüren	4,576	17.71	3424
Oberuzwil	Oberuzwil	6,491	14.11	3407
Uzwil	Uzwil	13,284	14.49	3408
Wil	Wil	22,974	7.62	3425
Zuzwil	Zuzwil	4,786	8.96	3426
	Total (10)	76,439	145.29	1728

== Mergers and name changes ==
The municipality of Bronschhofen merged into Wil on 1 January 2013.
