= Bettenauer Weiher =

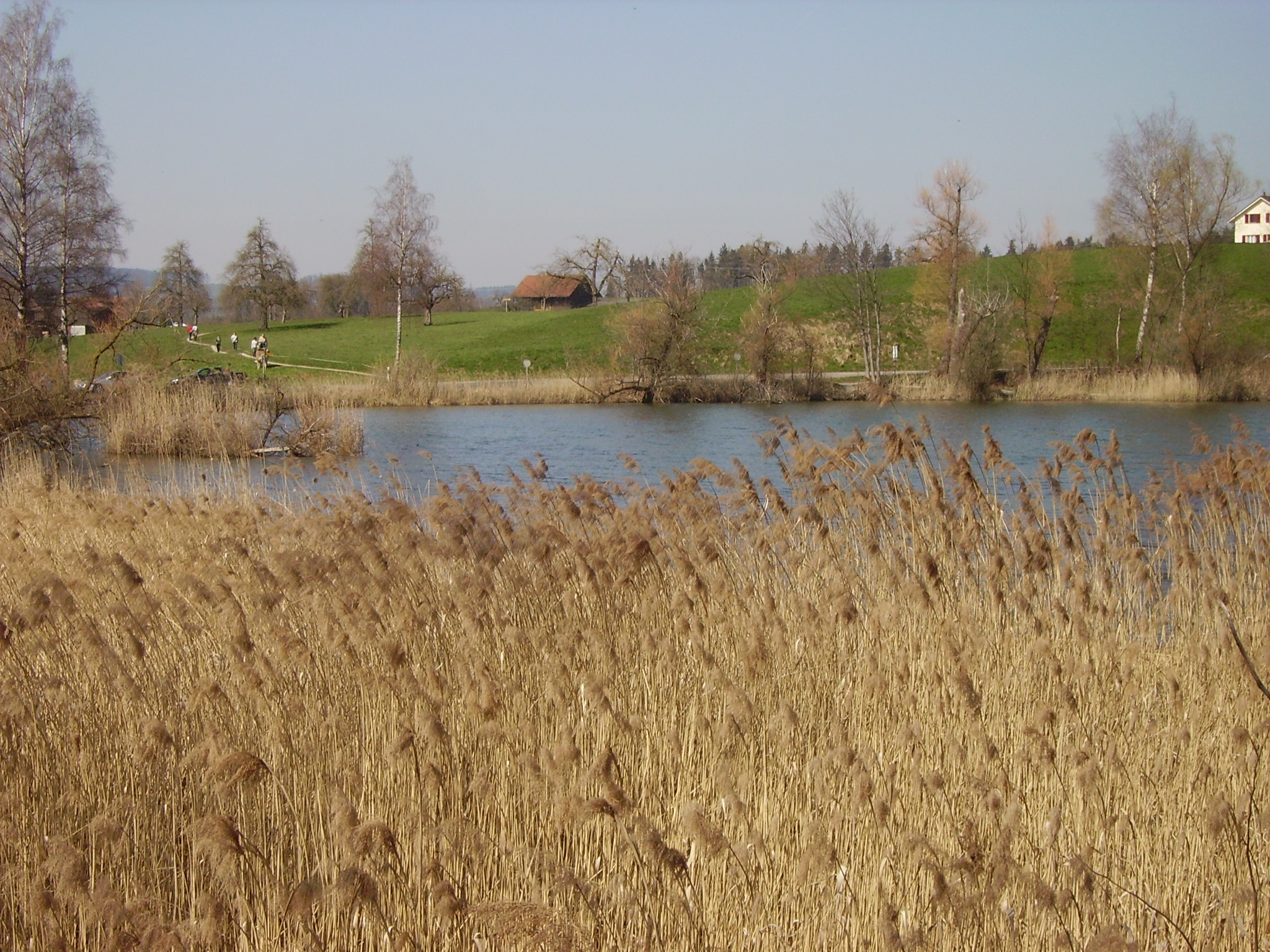

- Location within Canton of St. Gallen Location within Switzerland Location within Alps
- Interactive map of Bettenauer Weiher
- Location: Oberuzwil, Canton of St. Gallen
- Coordinates: 47°25′48″N 9°06′12″E
- Type: reservoir
- Primary inflows: Mülelibach
- Basin countries: Switzerland
- Max. length: 400 m (1,300 ft)
- Max. width: 100 m (330 ft)
- Surface area: 0.01 km^{2} (0.0039 sq mi)
- Max. depth: 2 m (6 ft 7 in)
- Surface elevation: 587 m (1,926 ft)

Bettenauer Weiher (or Bettenauerweier, coll. "Betti") is a reservoir between Jonschwil and Oberuzwil in the Canton of St. Gallen, Switzerland. The reservoir formed in the 15th century when a dam was built for a fish pond. Today, fishing in the lake is only allowed for retired persons of the local industrial enterprise Bühler AG, to which it belongs.

The lake is an amphibian spawning area of national importance in Switzerland.

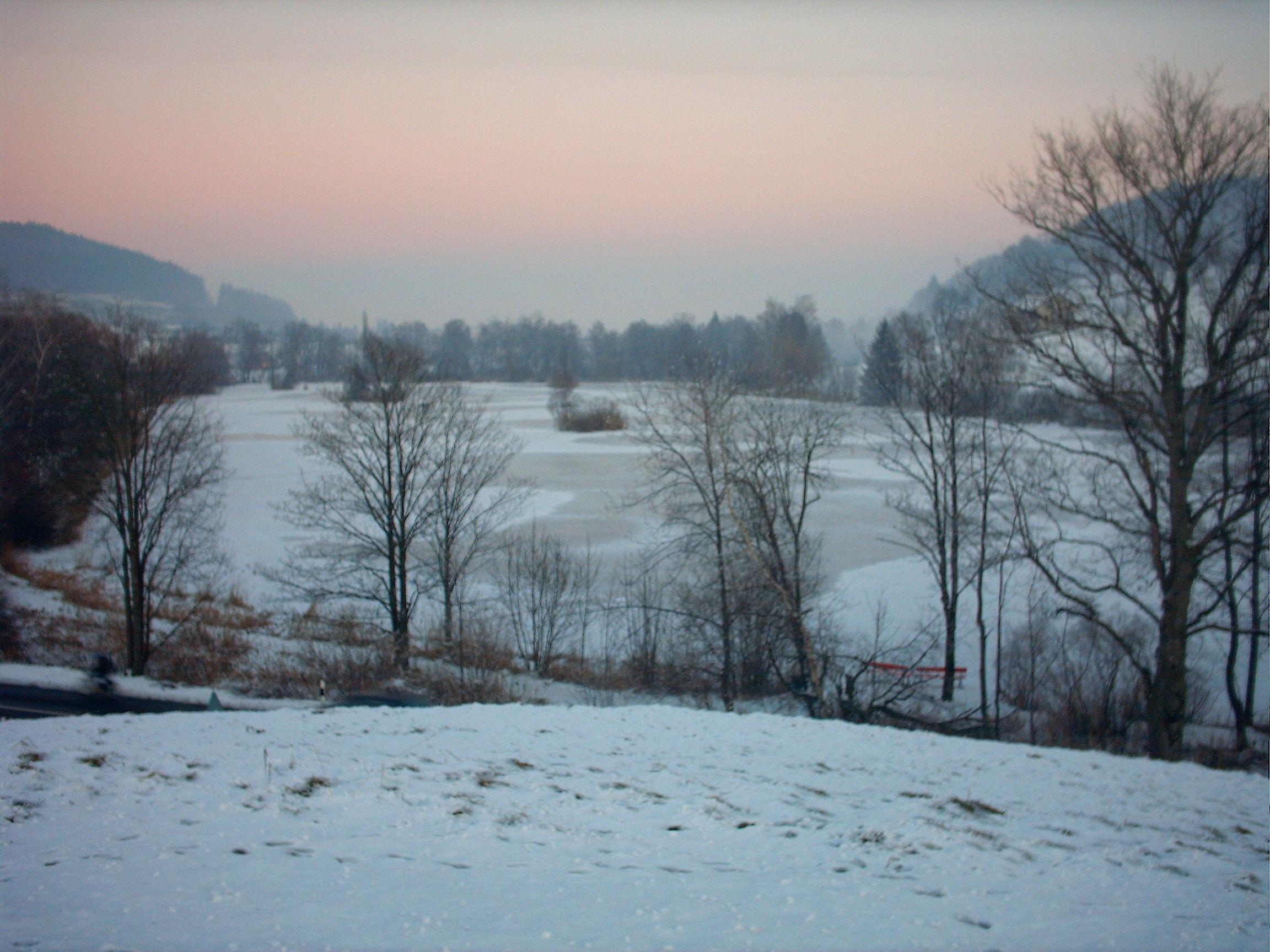
Bettenauer Weiher in Winter
