= Niederbüren =

- Municipality
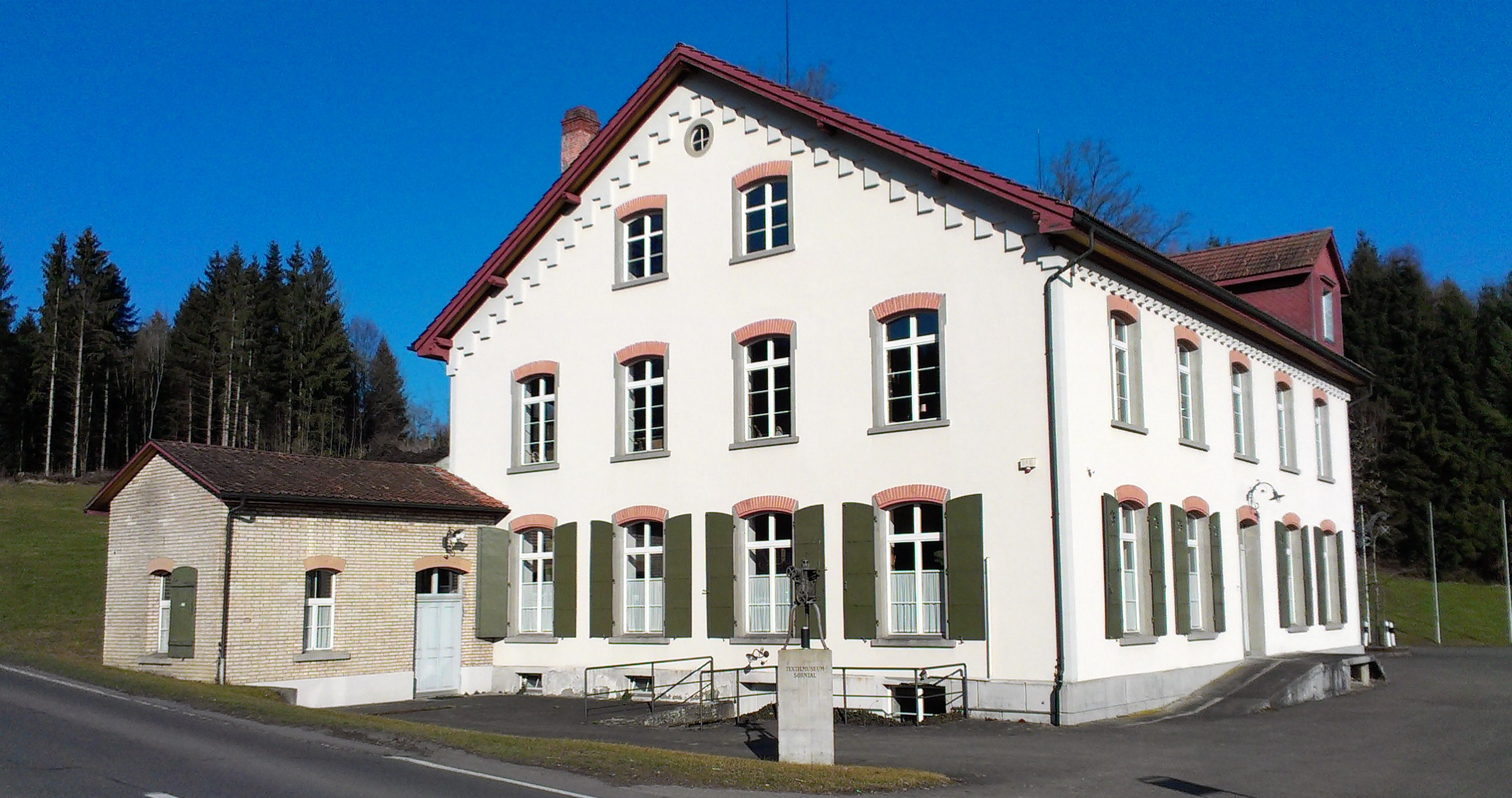
- The Sorntal Textile Museum

- Coat of arms
- Location of Niederbüren
- Location within Switzerland Location within Canton of St. Gallen
- Coordinates: 47°28′N 9°12′E
- Country: Switzerland
- Canton: St. Gallen
- District: Wil

Government
  - Mayor: Caroline Bartholet

Area
  - Total: 15.92 km^{2} (6.15 sq mi)
- Elevation: 488 m (1,601 ft)

Population (December 2020)
  - Total: 1,507
  - Density: 94.66/km^{2} (245.2/sq mi)
- Time zone: UTC+01:00 (CET)
  - Summer (DST): UTC+02:00 (CEST)
- Postal code: 9246
- SFOS number: 3422
- ISO 3166 code: CH-SG
- Surrounded by: Bischofszell (TG), Gossau, Niederhelfenschwil, Oberbüren, Waldkirch
- Website: www.niederbueren.ch

Niederbüren is a municipality in the Wahlkreis (constituency) of Wil in the canton of St. Gallen in Switzerland.

== History ==
Niederbüren is first mentioned about 737 as Gaulichesburia. In 817 it was mentioned as ad Purias and in 1266 as Nidernburron.

== Geography ==
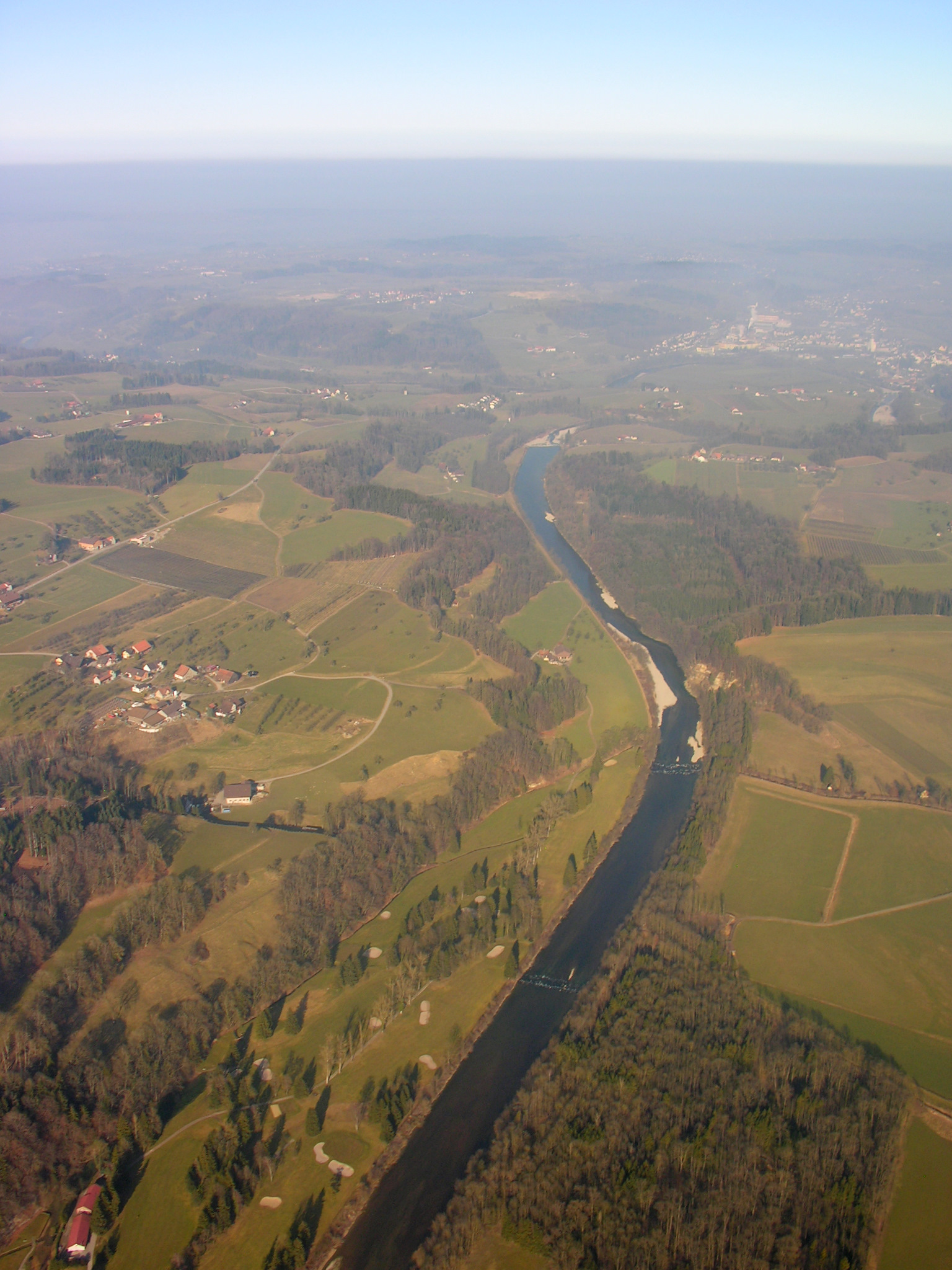
Aerial view over Niederbüren

Aerial view from 400 m by Walter Mittelholzer (1923)

Niederbüren has an area, as of 2006, of 15.8 km^{2} (6.1 sq mi). Of this area, 66.1% is used for agricultural purposes, while 24.1% is forested. Of the rest of the land, 8.6% is settled (buildings or roads) and the remainder (1.2%) is non-productive (rivers or lakes).

The municipality is located in the Wil Wahlkreis. It consists of the village of Niederbüren on the right bank of the Thur and hamlets in the neighboring hill country.

== Coat of arms ==
The blazon of the municipal coat of arms is Per fess Azure a Beehive Or with Bees and Argent three Bends Gules.

== Demographics ==
Niederbüren has a population (as of 31 December 2020) of 1,507. As of 2007, about 5.7% of the population was made up of foreign nationals. Of the foreign population, (as of 2000), 8 are from Germany, 2 are from Italy, 39 are from ex-Yugoslavia, 8 are from Austria, 10 are from Turkey, and 21 are from another country. Over the last 10 years the population has grown at a rate of 4.1%. Most of the population (as of 2000) speaks German (95.0%), with Serbo-Croatian being second most common ( 1.6%) and Turkish being third ( 0.6%). Of the Swiss national languages (as of 2000), 1,344 speak German, 1 person speaks, French, 2 people speak Italian, and 1 person speaks Romansh.

The age distribution, as of 2000, in Niederbüren is; 255 children or 18.0% of the population are between 0 and 9 years old and 236 teenagers or 16.7% are between 10 and 19. Of the adult population, 151 people or 10.7% of the population are between 20 and 29 years old. 253 people or 17.9% are between 30 and 39, 213 people or 15.1% are between 40 and 49, and 125 people or 8.8% are between 50 and 59. The senior population distribution is 80 people or 5.7% of the population are between 60 and 69 years old, 68 people or 4.8% are between 70 and 79, there are 31 people or 2.2% who are between 80 and 89, and there are 2 people or 0.1% who are between 90 and 99.

In 2000 there were 96 persons (or 6.8% of the population) who were living alone in a private dwelling. There were 206 (or 14.6%) persons who were part of a couple (married or otherwise committed) without children, and 1,047 (or 74.0%) who were part of a couple with children. There were 46 (or 3.3%) people who lived in single parent home, while there are 11 persons who were adult children living with one or both parents, 3 persons who lived in a household made up of relatives, 2 who lived household made up of unrelated persons, and 3 who are either institutionalized or live in another type of collective housing.

In the 2007 federal election the most popular party was the SVP which received 43.6% of the vote. The next three most popular parties were the CVP (31.4%), the FDP (11.6%) and the SP (5.8%).

In Niederbüren about 74.2% of the population (between age 25–64) have completed either non-mandatory upper secondary education or additional higher education (either university or a Fachhochschule). Out of the total population in Niederbüren, as of 2000, the highest education level completed by 274 people (19.4% of the population) was Primary, while 514 (36.4%) have completed their secondary education, 120 (8.5%) have attended a Tertiary school, and 40 (2.8%) are not in school. The remainder did not answer this question.

The historical population is given in the following table:

year	population
1798	947
1850	1,181
1900	1,038
1950	1,135
2000	1,414

== Heritage sites of national significance ==
The Textile Museum in Sorntal and the house at Staatsstrasse 35 are listed as Swiss heritage sites of national significance.

== Economy ==
As of 2007, Niederbüren had an unemployment rate of 1.56%. As of 2005, there were 197 people employed in the primary economic sector and about 78 businesses involved in this sector. 391 people are employed in the secondary sector and there are 22 businesses in this sector. 153 people are employed in the tertiary sector, with 35 businesses in this sector.

As of October 2009 the average unemployment rate was 2.6%. There were 133 businesses in the municipality of which 23 were involved in the secondary sector of the economy while 36 were involved in the third.

As of 2000 there were 297 residents who worked in the municipality, while 438 residents worked outside Niederbüren and 358 people commuted into the municipality for work.

== Religion ==
From the 2000 census, 954 or 67.5% are Roman Catholic, while 255 or 18.0% belonged to the Swiss Reformed Church. Of the rest of the population, there are 27 individuals (or about 1.91% of the population) who belong to the Orthodox Church, and there are 18 individuals (or about 1.27% of the population) who belong to another Christian church. There are 34 (or about 2.40% of the population) who are Islamic. There are 3 individuals (or about 0.21% of the population) who belong to another church (not listed on the census), 66 (or about 4.67% of the population) belong to no church, are agnostic or atheist, and 57 individuals (or about 4.03% of the population) did not answer the question.
