= Heidi Wunderli-Allenspach =

Swiss biologist

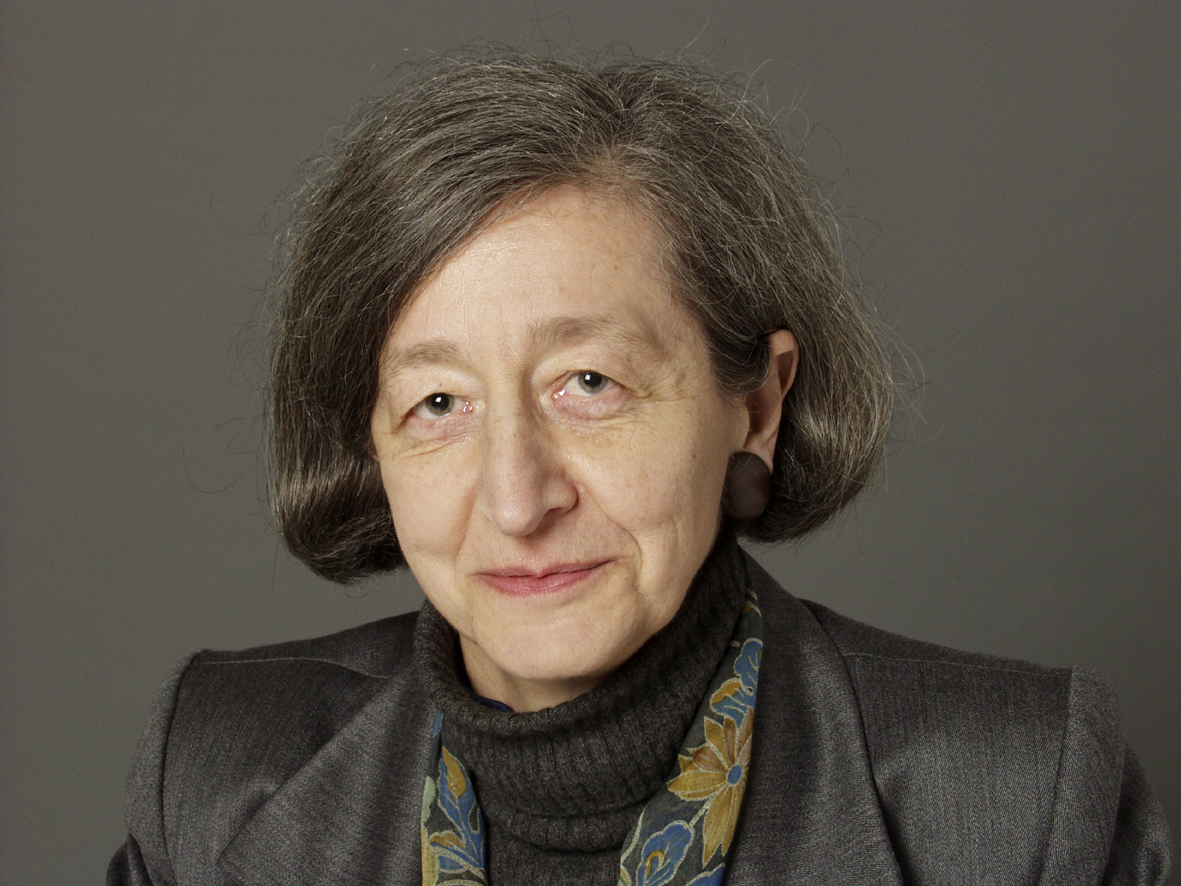
- Born: Allenspach, Hedi; 1 January 1947 (age 79); Niederuzwil, Switzerland
- Education: ETH Zürich; University of Zurich
- Occupations: Biologist, Professor
- Years active: 1970–
- Notable work: 1st female rector of ETH Zürich

Heidi Wunderli-Allenspach (born 1 January 1947) is a Swiss biologist and was the first female director of ETH Zürich.

== Life and work ==
Wunderli-Allenspach was born in 1947 in Niederuzwil in the Canton of St. Gallen in Switzerland. She graduated with the master's degree in biology at ETH Zurich in 1970, and then she worked as a research assistant at the Institute for Brain Research at the University of Zurich. Thenafter she postgraduatedin Experimental Medicine and Biology at the University of Zurich. Wunderli subsequently did her Ph.D. thesis at the Department of Microbiology at the Biozentrum in Basel, and as research associate at the Department of Surgery, Duke University Medical Center, Durham NC, from 1976 to 1978 in the USA. Between 1978 and 1981 she worked as a postdoctoral fellow at the Swiss Institute for Experimental Cancer Research in Lausanne, and from 1981 to 1984 at the Institute for Immunology and Virology of the University of Zurich.

== ETH Zurich ==
In 1985 Wunderli joined the Department of Pharmacy at the ETH Zurich. Between 1986 and 1992 she was an assistant professor and from 1992 to 1995 an associate professor in biopharmacy. As a professor, Wunderli-Allenspach assumed various charges in the university management. Among others she was the head of the Department of Pharmacy and later of the Department of Chemistry and Applied Biosciences. Education issues were always at her heart; during that time the curriculum was redesigned and the Bachelor/Master system was introduced.

From 1 September 2007 to 31 July 2012, Wunderli-Allenspach was the rector of ETH Zurich and deputy of the ETH's president. She was responsible for all aspects of education from the BSc/MSc level to Ph.D. and continuing education. As a representative of ETH she was a member of the foundation for student housing, for childcare, and of various institutions for the promotion of natural sciences in education, among them the Swiss Science Center Technorama in Winterthur and the NaTech educational program. Furthermore, she was a member of the board of the Zurich University Institute for Education and Didactics.

== Research ==
Wunderli-Allenspach's research was focused on physicochemical and cell biological aspects of drug absorption, distribution and elimination in the body. Her work was relevant in vitro models for the blood-brain-barrier as well as for epithelial barriers that were established in order to study the transport of drugs through and the interaction of drugs and excipients with membranes and cells under standardized conditions.

== Awards ==
- 1998–2007: Swiss Maturitätskommission and Deputy for the Curriculum of Pharmaceutical Sciences.
- Ecole Polytechnique de Paris, member of the supervisory board.
- Co-director of the "Society in Science: The Branco Weiss Fellowship".
- Chairwoman of the supervisory board of the Technical University of Darmstadt.
- Member of the SATW platform for education.

== Publications ==
- Peter Langguthm Gert Fricker, Heidi Wunderli-Allenspach: Biopharmazie. Wiley-VCH 2004, ISBN 978-3527304554.
- Bernard Testa, Stefanie D. Krämer, Heidi Wunderli-Allenspach, Gerd Folkers: Pharmacokinetic Profiling in Drug Research Hardcover, Wiley-VCH 2006, ISBN 978-3906390352.
