= Zuzwil, St. Gallen =

Zuzwil
- Municipality
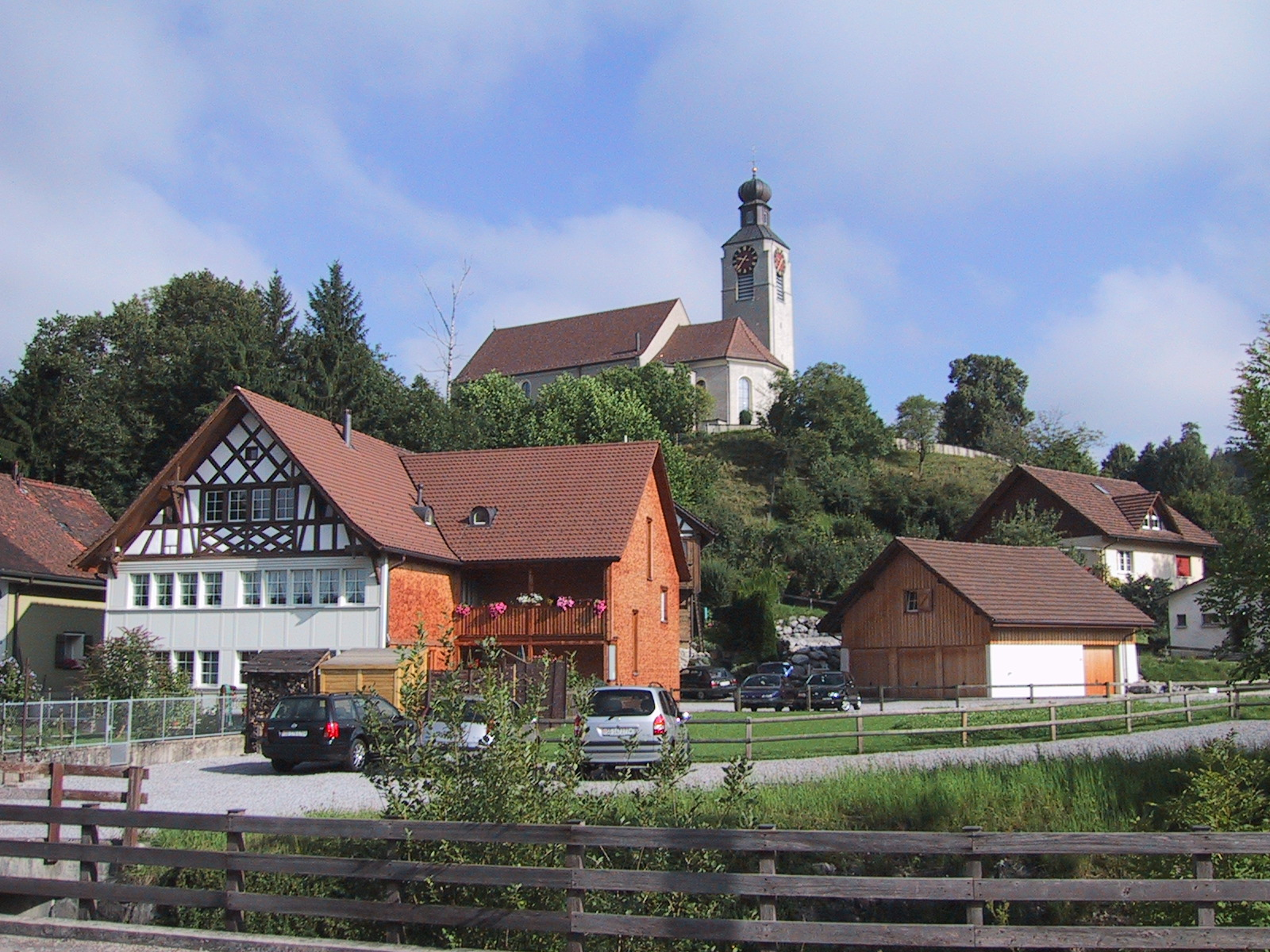

- Coat of arms
- Location of Zuzwil
- Location within Switzerland Location within Canton of St. Gallen
- Coordinates: 47°28′N 9°7′E
- Country: Switzerland
- Canton: St. Gallen
- District: Wil

Government
  - Mayor: Roland Hardegger

Area
  - Total: 8.96 km^{2} (3.46 sq mi)
- Elevation: 550 m (1,800 ft)

Population (December 2020)
  - Total: 4,786
  - Density: 534/km^{2} (1,380/sq mi)
- Time zone: UTC+01:00 (CET)
  - Summer (DST): UTC+02:00 (CEST)
- Postal code: 9524
- SFOS number: 3426
- ISO 3166 code: CH-SG
- Surrounded by: Bronschhofen, Niederhelfenschwil, Oberbüren, Uzwil, Wil, Wuppenau (TG)
- Website: www.zuzwil.ch

Zuzwil (SG) is a village and a municipality in the Wahlkreis (constituency) of Wil in the canton of St. Gallen in Switzerland.

== Geography ==
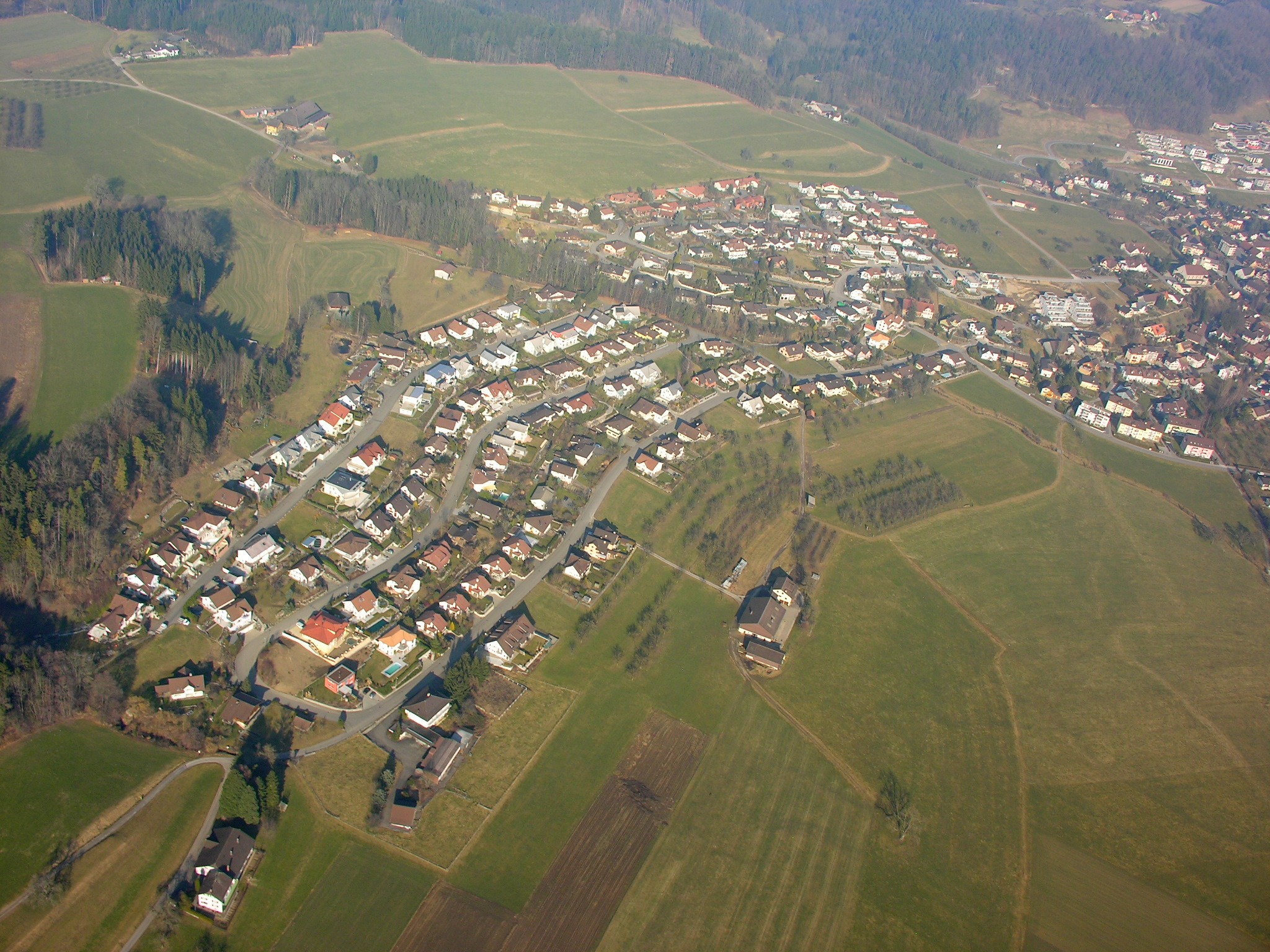
Aerial view of Zuzwil

Zuzwil has an area, as of 2006, of 9 km^{2} (3.5 sq mi). Of this area, 58.8% is used for agricultural purposes, while 23.8% is forested. Of the rest of the land, 16.7% is settled (buildings or roads) and the remainder (0.7%) is non-productive (rivers or lakes).

The town is situated within the northern foothills of the Alps, in the "Fürstenland" region just east of the medieval city of Wil. Wooded hills form the town's backdrop to the north, while the Thur meanders along its southern edge. The town's southerly aspect provides for stunning vistas of the eastern Swiss Alps, and of the Alpstein massif in particular. The Municipality of Zuzwil encompasses the towns of Zuzwil, Züberwangen and Weiern.

=== Weiern ===
In the year 1803, when the Canton of St. Gallen was formed, the hitherto unincorporated hamlet of Weiern became part of the municipality of Zuzwil.

=== Züberwangen ===
First mentioned in the Henauer Urkunde, Züberwangen was incorporated into the municipality of Zuzwil at the formation of the Canton of St. Gallen in 1803.

== History ==
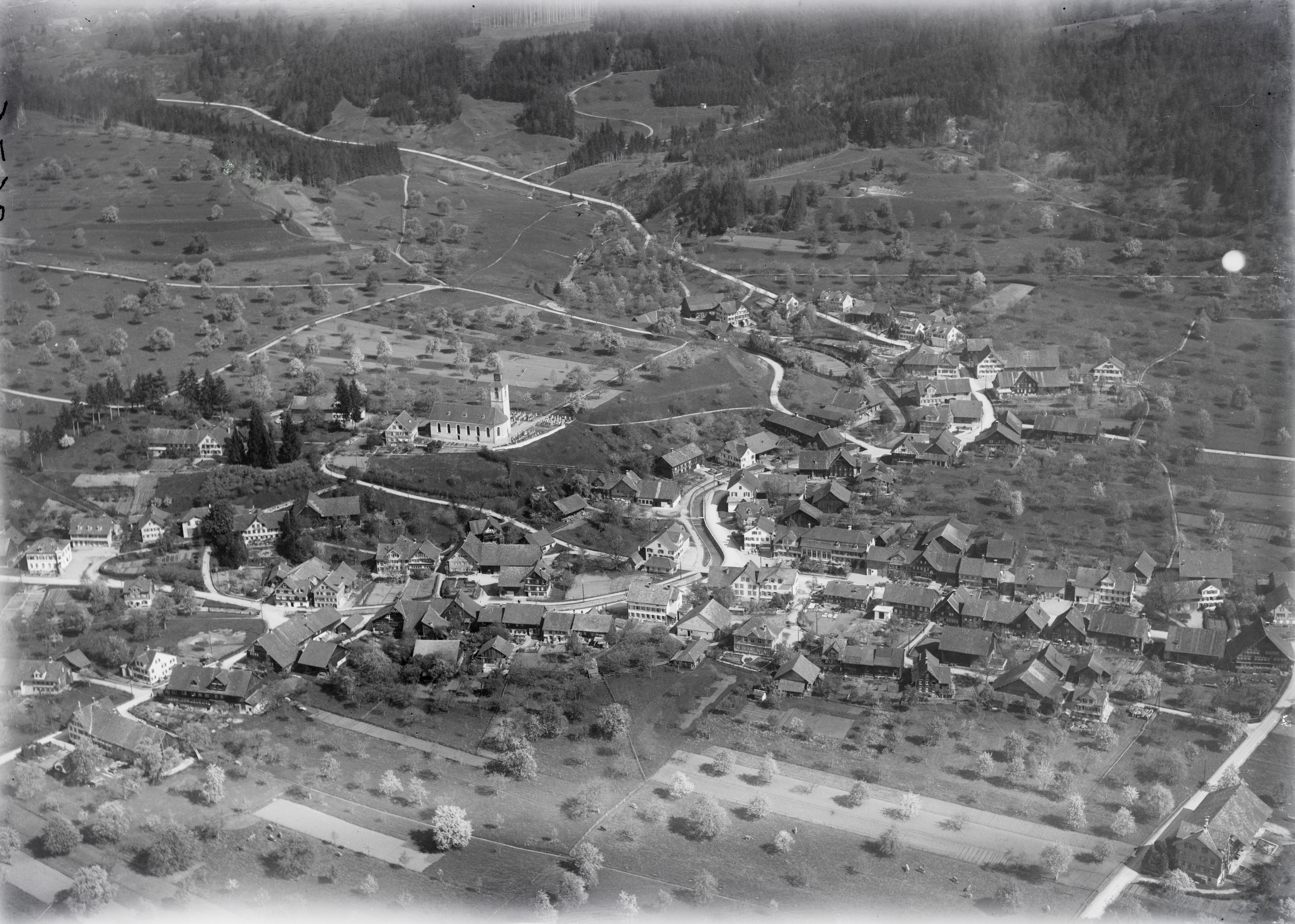
Aerial view from 300 m by Walter Mittelholzer (1920)

The region was settled by the Alamanni, a Germanic tribe, some 1,500 years ago. The influx of the Alamanni into northern, eastern and central Switzerland followed a period when the area had fallen under Roman rule and was sparsely settled. Prior to that, the region was inhabited by Celtic peoples.

The hamlet of “Züberwangen” was first mentioned in the Henauer Urkunde (Deed of Henau) of 754, wherein property in Züberwangen, along with property in some other hamlets, all owned by a man named “Rotphald” was deeded to the Abbey of St. Gall.

Zuzwil itself first appears in a separate deed, dated 11 May 761. As with the Henauer Urkunde, this document also deeds property, this time located in Zuzwil, to the Abbey of St. Gall.

“Zuocewilare” or “Zuozo Vilare” (Zuozo's hamlet) as Zuzwil was originally called, is believed to derive its name from an Alamanni clan leader by the name of “Zuozo” who established a settlement there.

== Coat of arms ==
The blazon of the municipal coat of arms is Gules two Lions passant Argent.

== Demographics ==
Zuzwil has a population (as of 31 December 2020) of 4,786. As of 2007, about 10.3% of the population was made up of foreign nationals. Of the foreign population, (as of 2000), 50 are from Germany, 73 are from Italy, 138 are from ex-Yugoslavia, 24 are from Austria, 20 are from Turkey, and 100 are from another country. Over the last 10 years the population has grown at a rate of 27.2%. Most of the population (as of 2000) speaks German (93.6%), with Albanian being second most common ( 1.3%) and Serbo-Croatian being third ( 1.0%). Of the Swiss national languages (as of 2000), 3,556 speak German, 4 people speak French, 33 people speak Italian,

The age distribution, as of 2000, in Zuzwil is; 592 children or 15.6% of the population are between 0 and 9 years old and 574 teenagers or 15.1% are between 10 and 19. Of the adult population, 397 people or 10.5% of the population are between 20 and 29 years old. 684 people or 18.0% are between 30 and 39, 623 people or 16.4% are between 40 and 49, and 487 people or 12.8% are between 50 and 59. The senior population distribution is 216 people or 5.7% of the population are between 60 and 69 years old, 133 people or 3.5% are between 70 and 79, there are 78 people or 2.1% who are between 80 and 89, and there are 14 people or 0.4% who are between 90 and 99.

In 2000 there were 290 persons (or 7.6% of the population) who were living alone in a private dwelling. There were 759 (or 20.0%) persons who were part of a couple (married or otherwise committed) without children, and 2,453 (or 64.6%) who were part of a couple with children. There were 203 (or 5.3%) people who lived in single parent home, while there are 25 persons who were adult children living with one or both parents, 10 persons who lived in a household made up of relatives, 14 who lived in a household made up of unrelated persons, and 44 who are either institutionalized or live in another type of collective housing.

In the 2007 federal election the most popular party was the SVP which received 38.9% of the vote. The next three most popular parties were the CVP (20.4%), the FDP (18%) and the SP (10.4%).

In Zuzwil about 80.4% of the population (between age 25–64) have completed either non-mandatory upper secondary education or additional higher education (either university or a Fachhochschule). Out of the total population in Zuzwil, as of 2000, the highest education level completed by 665 people (17.5% of the population) was Primary, while 1,507 (39.7%) have completed their secondary education, 478 (12.6%) have attended a Tertiary school, and 113 (3.0%) are not in school. The remainder did not answer this question.

== Economy ==
As of 2007, Zuzwil had an unemployment rate of 1.75%. As of 2005, there were 103 people employed in the primary economic sector and about 32 businesses involved in this sector. 606 people are employed in the secondary sector and there are 73 businesses in this sector. 704 people are employed in the tertiary sector, with 152 businesses in this sector.

As of October 2009 the average unemployment rate was 3.2%. There were 259 businesses in the municipality of which 78 were involved in the secondary sector of the economy while 155 were involved in the third.

As of 2000 there were 608 residents who worked in the municipality, while 1,411 residents worked outside Zuzwil and 699 people commuted into the municipality for work.

== Religion ==
From the 2000 census, 2,319 or 61.1% are Roman Catholic, while 925 or 24.4% belonged to the Swiss Reformed Church. Of the rest of the population, there are 3 individuals (or about 0.08% of the population) who belong to the Christian Catholic faith, there are 37 individuals (or about 0.97% of the population) who belong to the Orthodox Church, and there are 58 individuals (or about 1.53% of the population) who belong to another Christian church. There are 106 (or about 2.79% of the population) who are Islamic. There are 8 individuals (or about 0.21% of the population) who belong to another church (not listed on the census), 249 (or about 6.56% of the population) belong to no church, are agnostic or atheist, and 93 individuals (or about 2.45% of the population) did not answer the question.
