= Oberbüren =

- Municipality
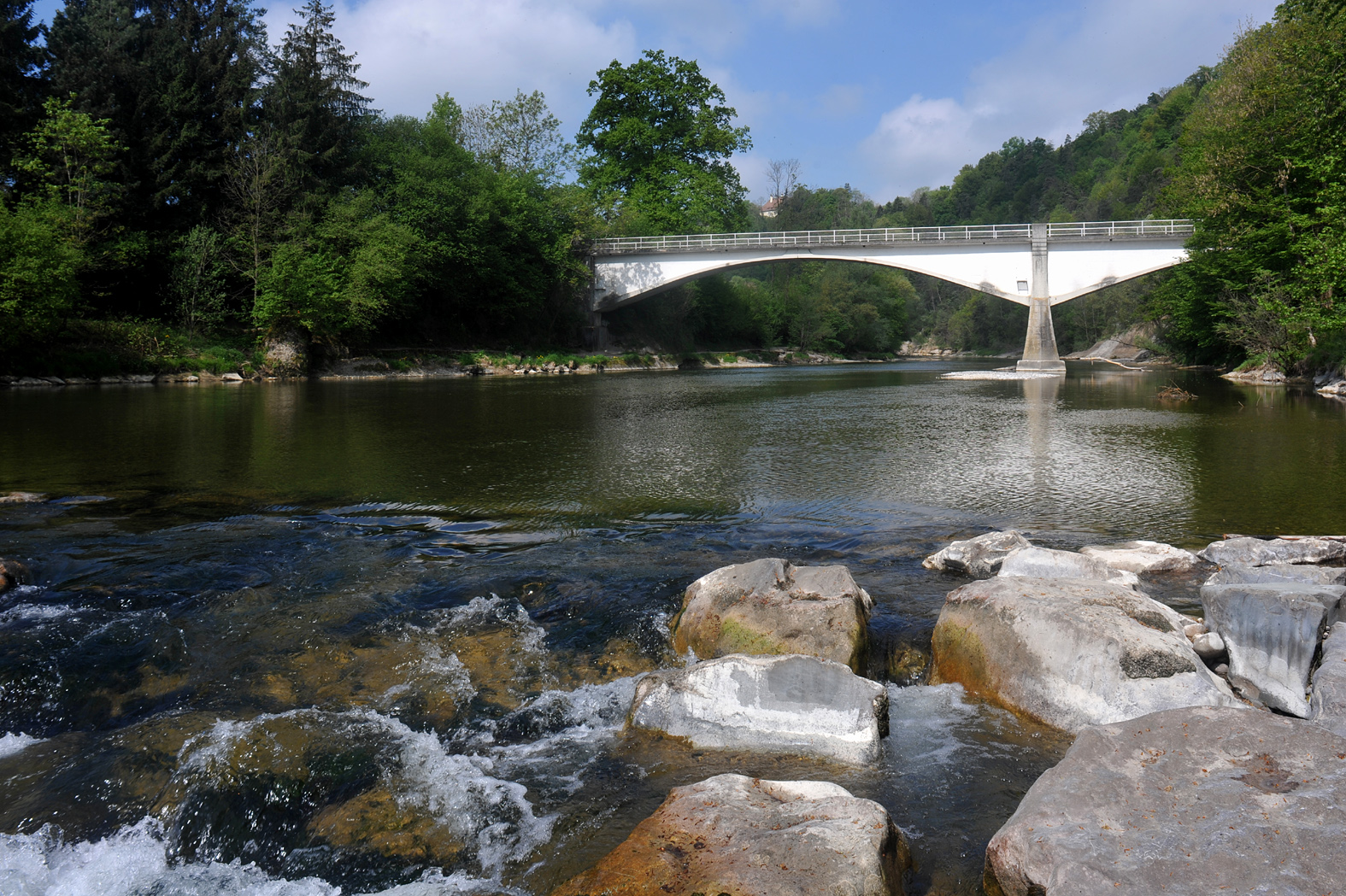

- Coat of arms
- Location of Oberbüren
- Location within Switzerland Location within Canton of St. Gallen
- Coordinates: 47°27′N 9°10′E
- Country: Switzerland
- Canton: St. Gallen
- District: Wil

Government
  - Mayor: Alexander Bommeli, Andrea Taverna

Area
  - Total: 17.71 km^{2} (6.84 sq mi)
- Elevation: 500 m (1,600 ft)

Population (December 2020)
  - Total: 4,576
  - Density: 258.4/km^{2} (669.2/sq mi)
- Time zone: UTC+01:00 (CET)
  - Summer (DST): UTC+02:00 (CEST)
- Postal code: 9245
- SFOS number: 3424
- ISO 3166 code: CH-SG
- Surrounded by: Flawil, Gossau, Niederbüren, Niederhelfenschwil, Oberuzwil, Uzwil, Zuzwil
- Website: www.oberbueren.ch

Oberbüren is a municipality in the Wahlkreis (constituency) of Wil in the canton of St. Gallen in Switzerland.

== History ==
Oberbüren is first mentioned in 817 as ad Purias.

== Geography ==
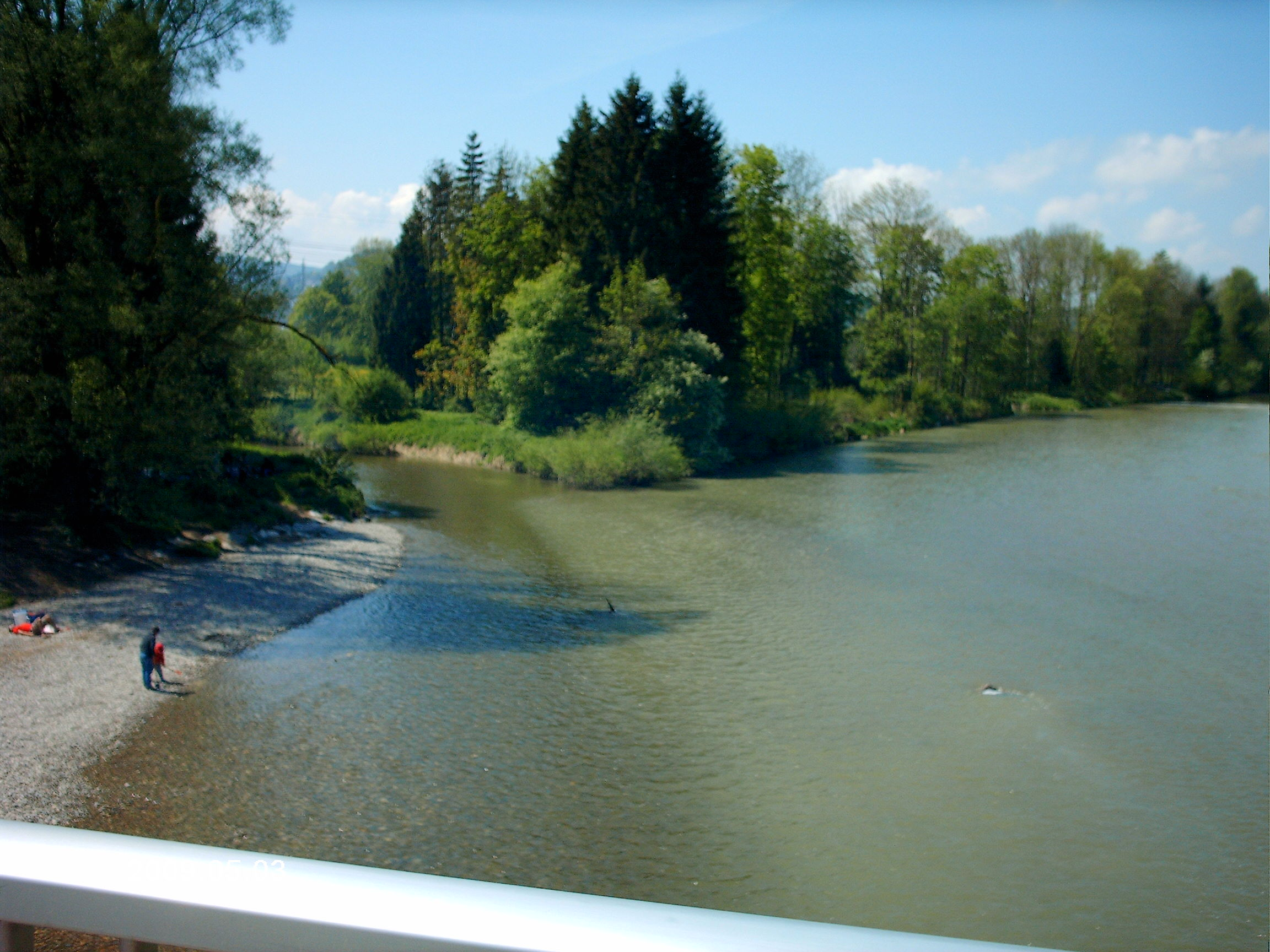
Near Oberbüren, the confluence of the Glatt river into the Thur, with the mouth of the Uze river in the background

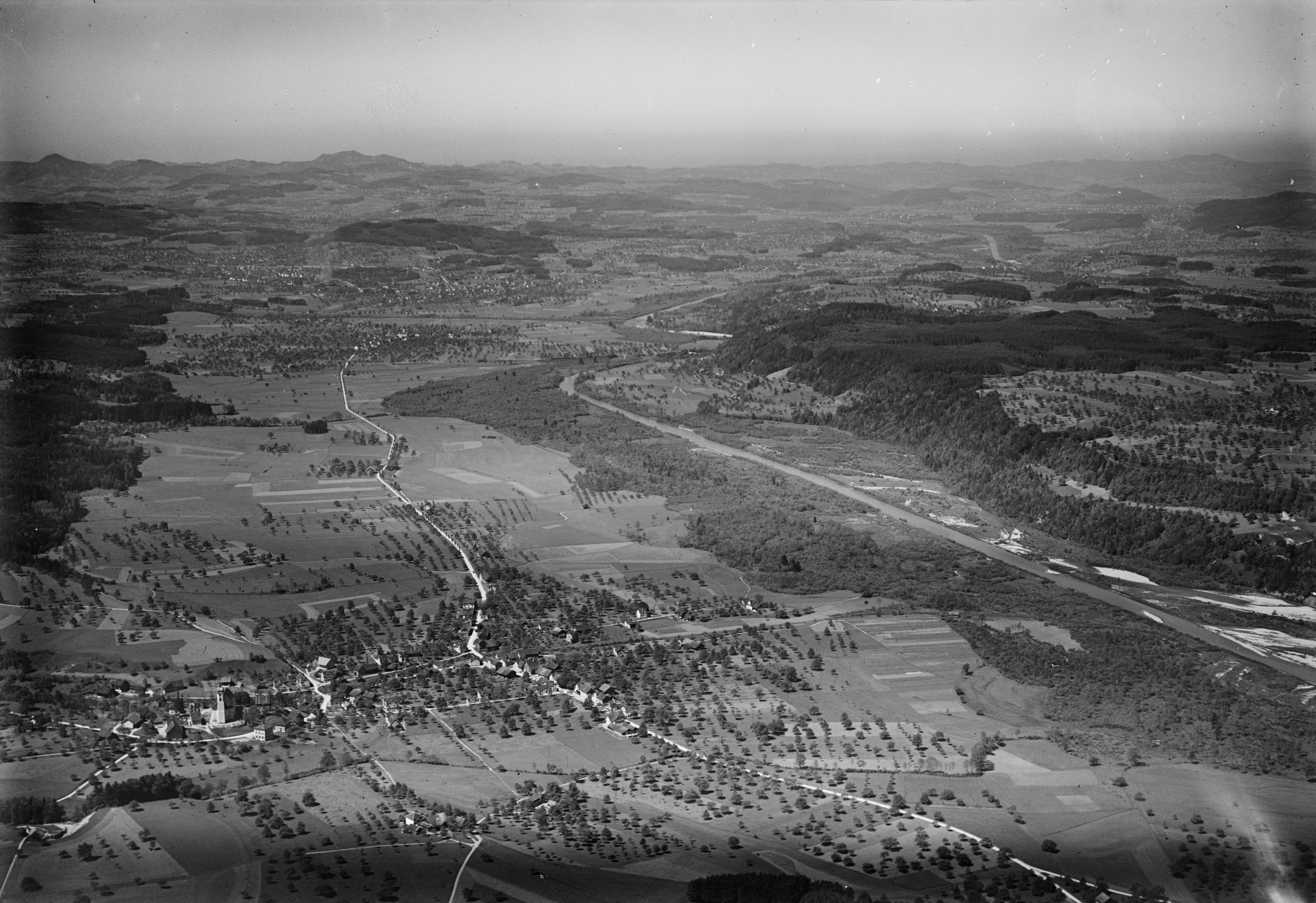
Aerial view from 600 m by Walter Mittelholzer (1929)

Oberbüren has an area, as of 2006, of 17.8 km^{2} (6.9 sq mi). Of this area, 65.8% is used for agricultural purposes, while 20.3% is forested. Of the rest of the land, 12% is settled (buildings or roads) and the remainder (1.9%) is non-productive (rivers or lakes).

The municipality is located in the Wil Wahlkreis along the Glatt and Thur rivers. It consists of the villages of Oberbüren, Niederwil, Durstudlen.

== Coat of arms ==
The blazon of the municipal coat of arms is Argent Stag Skull and Antlers Gules.

== Demographics ==
Oberbüren has a population (as of 31 December 2020) of 4,576. As of 2007, about 9.4% of the population was made up of foreign nationals. Of the foreign population, (as of 2000), 17 are from Germany, 34 are from Italy, 283 are from ex-Yugoslavia, 18 are from Austria, 19 are from Turkey, and 122 are from another country. Over the last 10 years the population has grown at a rate of 3.3%. Most of the population (as of 2000) speaks German (92.5%), with Serbo-Croatian being second most common ( 2.0%) and Albanian being third ( 1.9%). Of the Swiss national languages (as of 2000), 3,650 speak German, 13 people speak French, 12 people speak Italian, and 2 people speak Romansh.

The age distribution, as of 2000, in Oberbüren is; 603 children or 15.3% of the population are between 0 and 9 years old and 593 teenagers or 15.0% are between 10 and 19. Of the adult population, 506 people or 12.8% of the population are between 20 and 29 years old. 744 people or 18.9% are between 30 and 39, 540 people or 13.7% are between 40 and 49, and 455 people or 11.5% are between 50 and 59. The senior population distribution is 265 people or 6.7% of the population are between 60 and 69 years old, 178 people or 4.5% are between 70 and 79, there are 54 people or 1.4% who are between 80 and 89, and there are 8 people or 0.2% who are between 90 and 99.

In 2000 there were 302 persons (or 7.7% of the population) who were living alone in a private dwelling. There were 771 (or 19.5%) persons who were part of a couple (married or otherwise committed) without children, and 2,509 (or 63.6%) who were part of a couple with children. There were 153 (or 3.9%) people who lived in single parent home, while there are 41 persons who were adult children living with one or both parents, 21 persons who lived in a household made up of relatives, 14 who lived household made up of unrelated persons, and 135 who are either institutionalized or live in another type of collective housing.

In the 2007 federal election the most popular party was the SVP which received 47.4% of the vote. The next three most popular parties were the CVP (22.7%), the FDP (11%) and the SP (9%).

In Oberbüren about 72.8% of the population (between age 25-64) have completed either non-mandatory upper secondary education or additional higher education (either university or a Fachhochschule). Out of the total population in Oberbüren, as of 2000, the highest education level completed by 756 people (19.2% of the population) was Primary, while 1,564 (39.6%) have completed their secondary education, 330 (8.4%) have attended a Tertiary school, and 125 (3.2%) are not in school. The remainder did not answer this question.

The historical population is given in the following table:

year	population
1850	1,597
1900	1,753
1950	1,977
2000	3,946

== Economy ==
As of 2007, Oberbüren had an unemployment rate of 1.43%. As of 2005, there were 240 people employed in the primary economic sector and about 91 businesses involved in this sector. 812 people are employed in the secondary sector and there are 83 businesses in this sector. 1,214 people are employed in the tertiary sector, with 124 businesses in this sector.

As of October 2009 the average unemployment rate was 2.5%. There were 292 businesses in the municipality of which 78 were involved in the secondary sector of the economy while 128 were involved in the third.

As of 2000 there were 698 residents who worked in the municipality, while 1,382 residents worked outside Oberbüren and 1,216 people commuted into the municipality for work.

== Religion ==
From the 2000 census, 2,337 or 59.2% are Roman Catholic, while 831 or 21.1% belonged to the Swiss Reformed Church. Of the rest of the population, there are 85 individuals (or about 2.15% of the population) who belong to the Orthodox Church, and there are 96 individuals (or about 2.43% of the population) who belong to another Christian church. There are 264 (or about 6.69% of the population) who are Islamic. There are 8 individuals (or about 0.20% of the population) who belong to another church (not listed on the census), 191 (or about 4.84% of the population) belong to no church, are agnostic or atheist, and 134 individuals (or about 3.40% of the population) declined to answer the question.
