= Wuppenau =

- Municipality
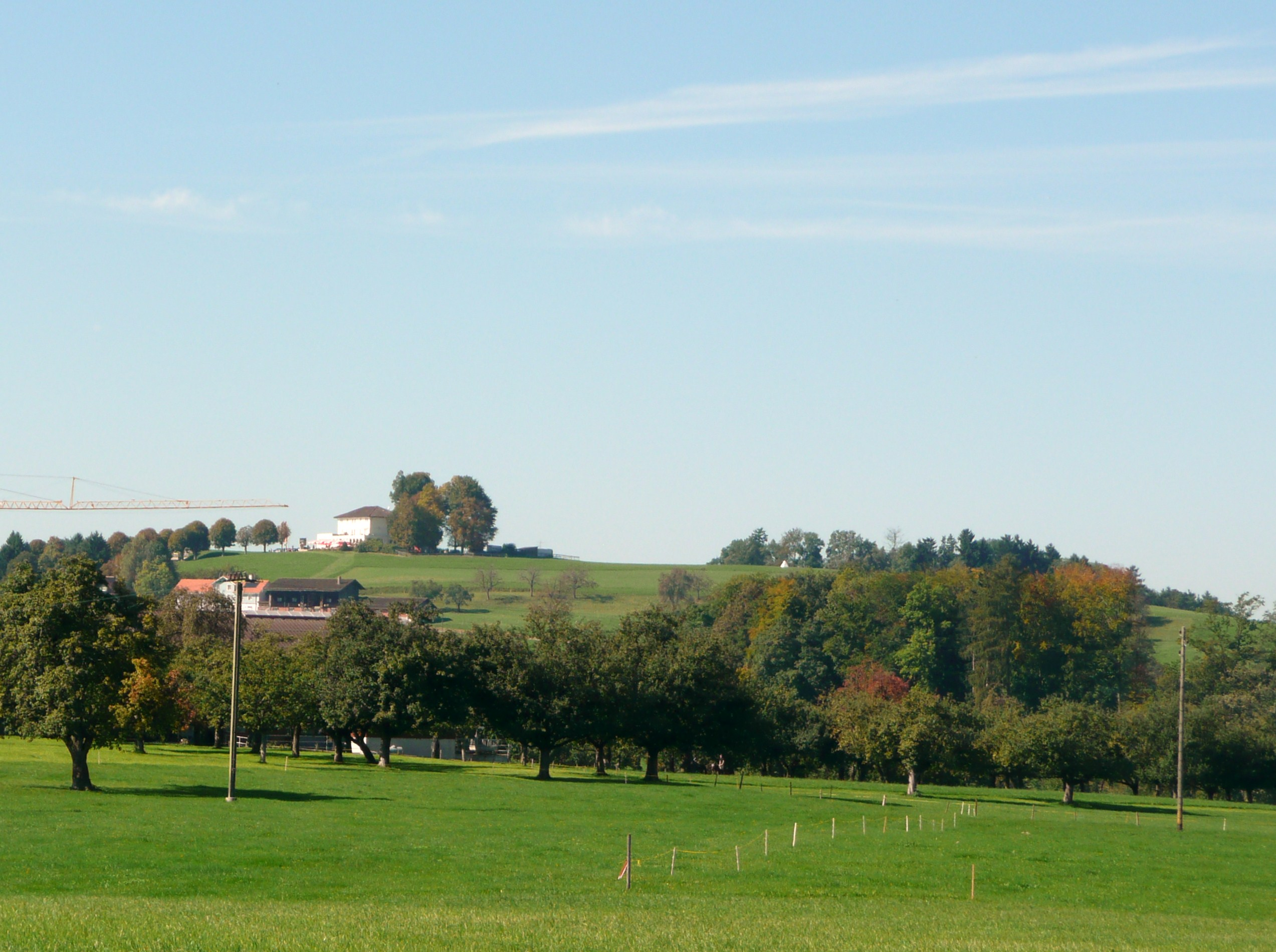

- Coat of arms
- Location of Wuppenau
- Location within Switzerland Location within Canton of Thurgau
- Coordinates: 47°29′N 9°6′E
- Country: Switzerland
- Canton: Thurgau
- District: Weinfelden

Area
  - Total: 12.15 km^{2} (4.69 sq mi)
- Elevation: 615 m (2,018 ft)

Population (December 2007)
  - Total: 1,008
  - Density: 82.96/km^{2} (214.9/sq mi)
- Time zone: UTC+01:00 (CET)
  - Summer (DST): UTC+02:00 (CEST)
- Postal code: 9514
- SFOS number: 4791
- ISO 3166 code: CH-TG
- Surrounded by: Braunau, Bronschhofen (SG), Kradolf-Schönenberg, Niederhelfenschwil (SG), Schönholzerswilen, Zuzwil (SG)
- Website: wuppenau.ch

Wuppenau is a municipality in the district of Weinfelden in the canton of Thurgau in Switzerland.

== Geography ==
Wuppenau has an area, as of 2009, of 12.15 square kilometers (4.69 sq mi). Of this area, 9.07 km^{2} (3.50 sq mi) or 74.7% is used for agricultural purposes, while 2.26 km^{2} (0.87 sq mi) or 18.6% is forested. Of the rest of the land, 0.8 km^{2} (0.31 sq mi) or 6.6% is settled (buildings or roads).

Of the built up area, industrial buildings made up 3.5% of the total area while housing and buildings made up 0.1% and transportation infrastructure made up 0.3%. while parks, green belts and sports fields made up 2.6%. Out of the forested land, 16.0% of the total land area is heavily forested and 2.6% is covered with orchards or small clusters of trees. Of the agricultural land, 66.0% is used for growing crops, while 8.6% is used for orchards or vine crops.

In 1971 Hosenruck merged with Wuppenau.

== Demographics ==
Wuppenau has a population (as of December 2020) of 1,135. As of 2008, 4.9% of the population are foreign nationals. Over the last 10 years (1997–2007) the population has changed at a rate of -3.1%. Most of the population (as of 2000) speaks German (97.0%), with Serbo-Croatian being second most common ( 0.9%) and Romansh being third ( 0.5%).

As of 2008, the gender distribution of the population was 50.3% male and 49.7% female. The population was made up of 479 Swiss men (47.5% of the population), and 28 (2.8%) non-Swiss men. There were 480 Swiss women (47.6%), and 21 (2.1%) non-Swiss women.

In 2008 there were 11 live births to Swiss citizens and births to non-Swiss citizens, and in same time span there were 8 deaths of Swiss citizens. Ignoring immigration and emigration, the population of Swiss citizens increased by 3 while the foreign population remained the same. There was 1 Swiss man, 1 Swiss woman who emigrated from Switzerland to another country, 4 non-Swiss men who emigrated from Switzerland to another country and 1 non-Swiss woman who emigrated from Switzerland to another country. The total Swiss population change in 2008 (from all sources) was a decrease of 14 and the non-Swiss population change was an increase of 11 people. This represents a population growth rate of -0.3%.

The age distribution, as of 2009, in Wuppenau is; 117 children or 11.5% of the population are between 0 and 9 years old and 157 teenagers or 15.4% are between 10 and 19. Of the adult population, 97 people or 9.5% of the population are between 20 and 29 years old. 143 people or 14.0% are between 30 and 39, 164 people or 16.1% are between 40 and 49, and 142 people or 13.9% are between 50 and 59. The senior population distribution is 104 people or 10.2% of the population are between 60 and 69 years old, 69 people or 6.8% are between 70 and 79, there are 26 people or 2.5% who are between 80 and 89, and there are 2 people or 0.2% who are 90 and older.

As of 2000, there were 278 private households in the municipality, and an average of 2.7 persons per household. In 2000 there were 168 single family homes (or 90.3% of the total) out of a total of 186 inhabited buildings. There were 14 two family buildings (7.5%), 1 three family buildings (.5%) and 3 multi-family buildings (or 1.6%). There were 122 (or 12.2%) persons who were part of a couple without children, and 463 (or 46.3%) who were part of a couple with children. There were 80 (or 8.0%) people who lived in single parent home, while there are 9 persons who were adult children living with one or both parents, 4 persons who lived in a household made up of relatives, 2 who lived in a household made up of unrelated persons, and 248 who are either institutionalized or live in another type of collective housing.

The vacancy rate for the municipality, in 2008, was 0.8%. As of 2007, the construction rate of new housing units was 3 new units per 1000 residents. In 2000 there were 351 apartments in the municipality. The most common apartment size was the 6 room apartment of which there were 140. There were 5 single room apartments and 140 apartments with six or more rooms. As of 2000 the average price to rent an average apartment in Wuppenau was 1089.24 Swiss francs (CHF) per month (US$870, £490, €700 approx. exchange rate from 2000). The average rate for a one-room apartment was 400.00 CHF (US$320, £180, €260), a two-room apartment was about 805.00 CHF (US$640, £360, €520), a three-room apartment was about 740.00 CHF (US$590, £330, €470) and a six or more room apartment cost an average of 1377.35 CHF (US$1100, £620, €880). The average apartment price in Wuppenau was 97.6% of the national average of 1116 CHF.

In the 2007 federal election the most popular party was the SVP which received 47.71% of the vote. The next three most popular parties were the CVP (20.47%), the Green Party (9.73%) and the SP (6.56%). In the federal election, a total of 383 votes were cast, and the voter turnout was 51.3%.

The historical population is given in the following table:

year	population
1950	932
1960	857
1980	815
1990	1,002
2000	1,001

== Sights ==
The entire hamlet of Heiligkreuz is designated as part of the Inventory of Swiss Heritage Sites.

== Economy ==
As of 2007, Wuppenau had an unemployment rate of 1.06%. As of 2005, there were 154 people employed in the primary economic sector and about 62 businesses involved in this sector. 64 people are employed in the secondary sector and there are 17 businesses in this sector. 88 people are employed in the tertiary sector, with 27 businesses in this sector.

In 2000 there were 709 workers who lived in the municipality. Of these, 322 or about 45.4% of the residents worked outside Wuppenau while 69 people commuted into the municipality for work. There were a total of 456 jobs (of at least 6 hours per week) in the municipality. Of the working population, 8.4% used public transportation to get to work, and 47.2% used a private car.

== Religion ==
From the 2000 census, 583 or 58.2% were Roman Catholic, while 302 or 30.2% belonged to the Swiss Reformed Church. Of the rest of the population, there are 5 individuals (or about 0.50% of the population) who belong to the Orthodox Church, and there are 24 individuals (or about 2.40% of the population) who belong to another Christian church. There were 4 (or about 0.40% of the population) who are Islamic. There are 6 individuals (or about 0.60% of the population) who belong to another church (not listed on the census), 51 (or about 5.09% of the population) belong to no church, are agnostic or atheist, and 26 individuals (or about 2.60% of the population) did not answer the question.

== Education ==
In Wuppenau about 73.2% of the population (between age 25-64) have completed either non-mandatory upper secondary education or additional higher education (either university or a Fachhochschule).
