= Oberuzwil =

- Municipality
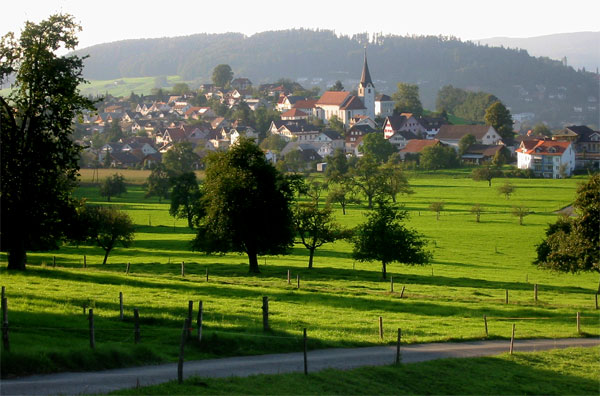

- Coat of arms
- Location of Oberuzwil
- Location within Switzerland Location within Canton of St. Gallen
- Coordinates: 47°26′N 9°8′E
- Country: Switzerland
- Canton: St. Gallen
- District: Wahlkreis Wil

Government
  - Mayor: Cornel Egger

Area
  - Total: 14.11 km^{2} (5.45 sq mi)
- Elevation: 560 m (1,840 ft)

Population (December 2020)
  - Total: 6,491
  - Density: 460.0/km^{2} (1,191/sq mi)
- Time zone: UTC+01:00 (CET)
  - Summer (DST): UTC+02:00 (CEST)
- Postal code: 9242
- SFOS number: 3407
- ISO 3166 code: CH-SG
- Localities: Oberuzwil, Bichwil, Riggenschwil, Niederglatt
- Surrounded by: Degersheim, Flawil, Jonschwil, Lütisburg, Oberbüren, Uzwil
- Website: www.oberuzwil.ch

Oberuzwil is a municipality in the Wahlkreis (constituency) of Wil in the canton of St. Gallen in Switzerland.

== History ==
Oberuzwil is first mentioned in 819 as Uzzinwilare. In 1382 it was mentioned as Obren Utzwille. The village of Bichwil was first mentioned in 865 as Pichilinwilare and Niederglatt was mentioned in 1336 as Nidernglat.

== Geography ==
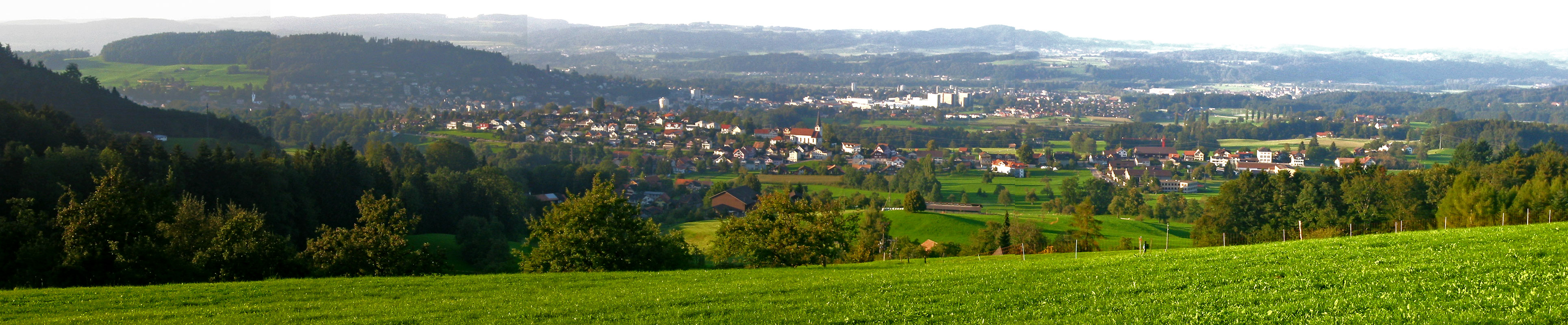
Panorama of Uzwil-Oberuzwil. In the foreground: Bichwil; background (left to right): Oberuzwil, Uzwil, Industrie Uzwil, Niederuzwil

Aerial view from 800 m by Walter Mittelholzer (1927)

Oberuzwil has an area, as of 2006, of 14.1 km^{2} (5.4 sq mi). Of this area, 59.7% is used for agricultural purposes, while 25.9% is forested. Of the rest of the land, 13.2% is settled (buildings or roads) and the remainder (1.3%) is non-productive (rivers or lakes).

The municipality is located in the Wil Wahlkreis. It consists of the villages of Oberuzwil, Bichwil and Niederglatt and the hamlets of Buechen, Wilen, Riggenschwil, Oberrindal, Ramsau as well as scattered farm houses.

Bettenauer Weiher is located at the border to Jonschwil.

== Coat of arms ==
The blazon of the municipal coat of arms is Azure a Mill Wheel Argent and a Barrulet wavy abased, and in Base per pale chequy Argent and Gules a Chief Argent and Argent two Bends Sable.

== Demographics ==
Oberuzwil has a population (as of 31 December 2020) of 6,491. As of 2007, about 14.7% of the population was made up of foreign nationals. Of the foreign population, (as of 2000), 85 are from Germany, 92 are from Italy, 401 are from ex-Yugoslavia, 36 are from Austria, 42 are from Turkey, and 78 are from another country. Over the last 10 years the population has grown at a rate of 6.2%. Most of the population (as of 2000) speaks German (91.4%), with Serbo-Croatian being second most common ( 2.6%) and Albanian being third ( 1.9%). Of the Swiss national languages (as of 2000), 5,048 speak German, 19 people speak French, 65 people speak Italian, and 8 people speak Romansh.

The age distribution, as of 2000, in Oberuzwil is; 730 children or 13.2% of the population are between 0 and 9 years old and 823 teenagers or 14.9% are between 10 and 19. Of the adult population, 569 people or 10.3% of the population are between 20 and 29 years old. 866 people or 15.7% are between 30 and 39, 812 people or 14.7% are between 40 and 49, and 671 people or 12.2% are between 50 and 59. The senior population distribution is 470 people or 8.5% of the population are between 60 and 69 years old, 357 people or 6.5% are between 70 and 79, there are 198 people or 3.6% who are between 80 and 89, and there are 25 people or 0.5% who are between 90 and 99.

In 2000 there were 568 persons (or 10.3% of the population) who were living alone in a private dwelling. There were 1,213 (or 22.0%) persons who were part of a couple (married or otherwise committed) without children, and 3,251 (or 58.9%) who were part of a couple with children. There were 244 (or 4.4%) people who lived in single parent home, while there are 40 persons who were adult children living with one or both parents, 30 persons who lived in a household made up of relatives, 37 who lived in a household made up of unrelated persons, and 138 who are either institutionalized or live in another type of collective housing.

In the 2007 federal election the most popular party was the SVP which received 34% of the vote. The next three most popular parties were the CVP (23.1%), the FDP (16.4%) and the SP (12.1%).

In Oberuzwil about 74.3% of the population (between age 25–64) have completed either non-mandatory upper secondary education or additional higher education (either university or a Fachhochschule). Out of the total population in Oberuzwil, as of 2000, the highest education level completed by 1,093 people (19.8% of the population) was Primary, while 2,033 (36.8%) have completed their secondary education, 644 (11.7%) have attended a Tertiary school, and 220 (4.0%) are not in school. The remainder did not answer this question.

The historical population is given in the following table:

year	population
1837	2,175
1850	2,312
1900	3,396
1950	4,102
2000	5,521

== Sights ==
The hamlet of Niederglatt is designated as part of the Inventory of Swiss Heritage Sites.

== Economy ==
As of 2007, Oberuzwil had an unemployment rate of 1.72%. As of 2005, there were 187 people employed in the primary economic sector and about 69 businesses involved in this sector. 603 people are employed in the secondary sector and there are 56 businesses in this sector. 816 people are employed in the tertiary sector, with 161 businesses in this sector.

As of October 2009 the average unemployment rate was 3.5%. There were 296 businesses in the municipality of which 60 were involved in the secondary sector of the economy while 172 were involved in the third.

As of 2000 there were 745 residents who worked in the municipality, while 1,975 residents worked outside Oberuzwil and 843 people commuted into the municipality for work.

== Religion ==
From the 2000 census, 2,633 or 47.7% are Roman Catholic, while 1,762 or 31.9% belonged to the Swiss Reformed Church. Of the rest of the population, there are 2 individuals (or about 0.04% of the population) who belong to the Christian Catholic faith, there are 169 individuals (or about 3.06% of the population) who belong to the Orthodox Church, and there are 223 individuals (or about 4.04% of the population) who belong to another Christian church. There is 1 individual who is Jewish, and 190 (or about 3.44% of the population) who are Islamic. There are 23 individuals (or about 0.42% of the population) who belong to another church (not listed on the census), 352 (or about 6.38% of the population) belong to no church, are agnostic or atheist, and 166 individuals (or about 3.01% of the population) did not answer the question.
