= Niederhelfenschwil =

- Municipality
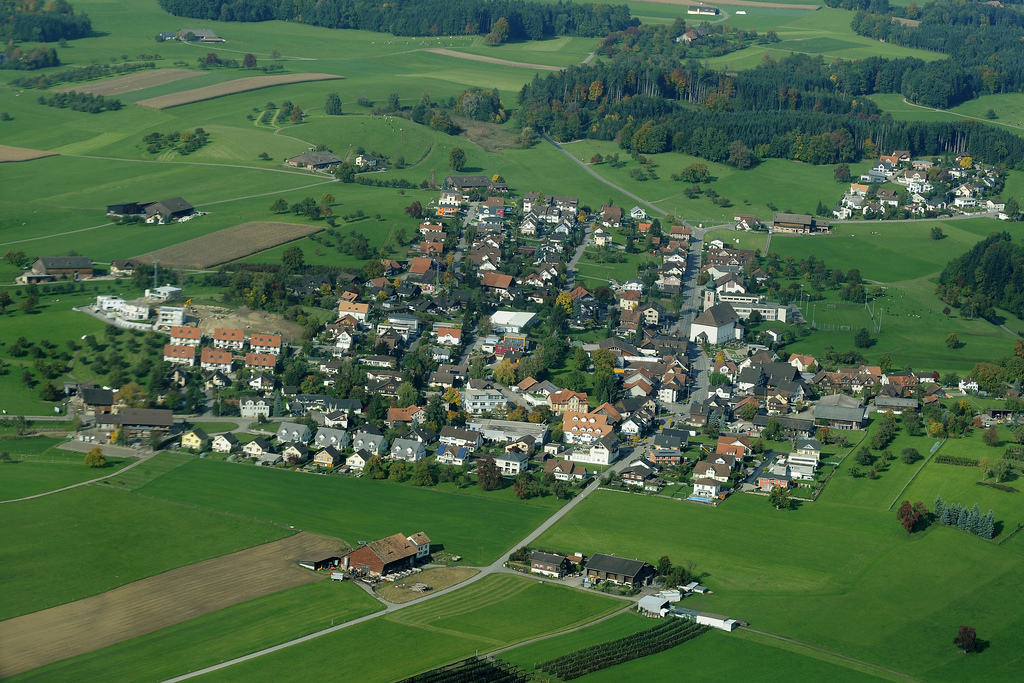
- Niederhelfenschwil village from the air

- Coat of arms
- Location of Niederhelfenschwil
- Location within Switzerland Location within Canton of St. Gallen
- Coordinates: 47°29′N 9°11′E
- Country: Switzerland
- Canton: St. Gallen
- District: Wil

Government
  - Mayor: Simon Thalmann

Area
  - Total: 16.34 km^{2} (6.31 sq mi)
- Elevation: 580 m (1,900 ft)

Population (December 2020)
  - Total: 3,181
  - Density: 194.7/km^{2} (504.2/sq mi)
- Time zone: UTC+01:00 (CET)
  - Summer (DST): UTC+02:00 (CEST)
- Postal code: 9527
- SFOS number: 3423
- ISO 3166 code: CH-SG
- Surrounded by: Bischofszell (TG), Kradolf-Schönenberg (TG), Niederbüren, Oberbüren, Wuppenau (TG), Zuzwil
- Website: www.niederhelfenschwil.ch

Niederhelfenschwil is a municipality in the Wahlkreis (constituency) of Wil in the canton of St. Gallen in Switzerland.

== History ==
Niederhelfenschwil is first mentioned in 818 as Helfolteswilare. In 1426 it was mentioned as Nidren-Helffentswile. The village of Lenggenwil was mentioned in 903 as Linkenvilare.

== Geography ==
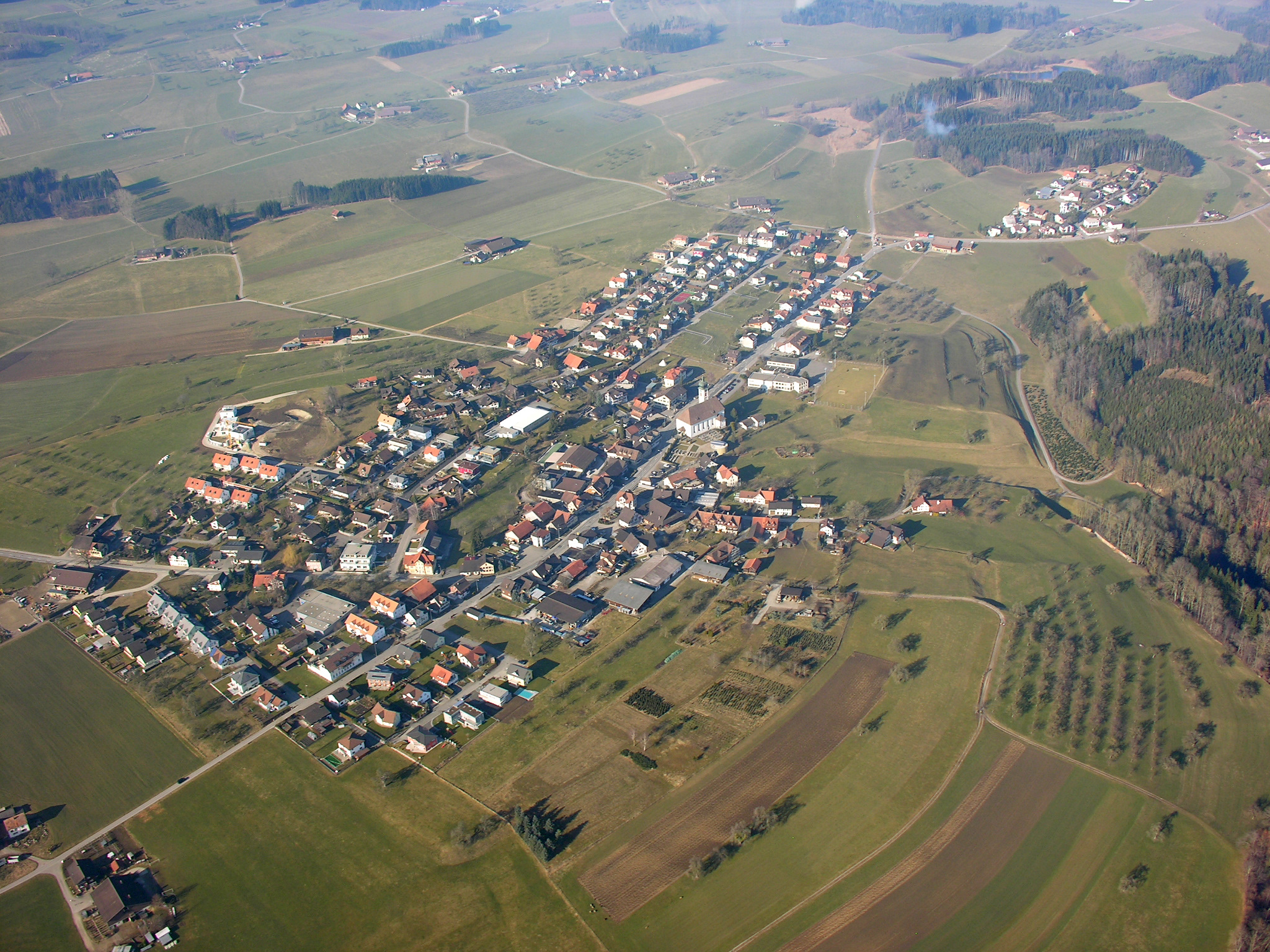
Aerial view of Niederhelfenschwil

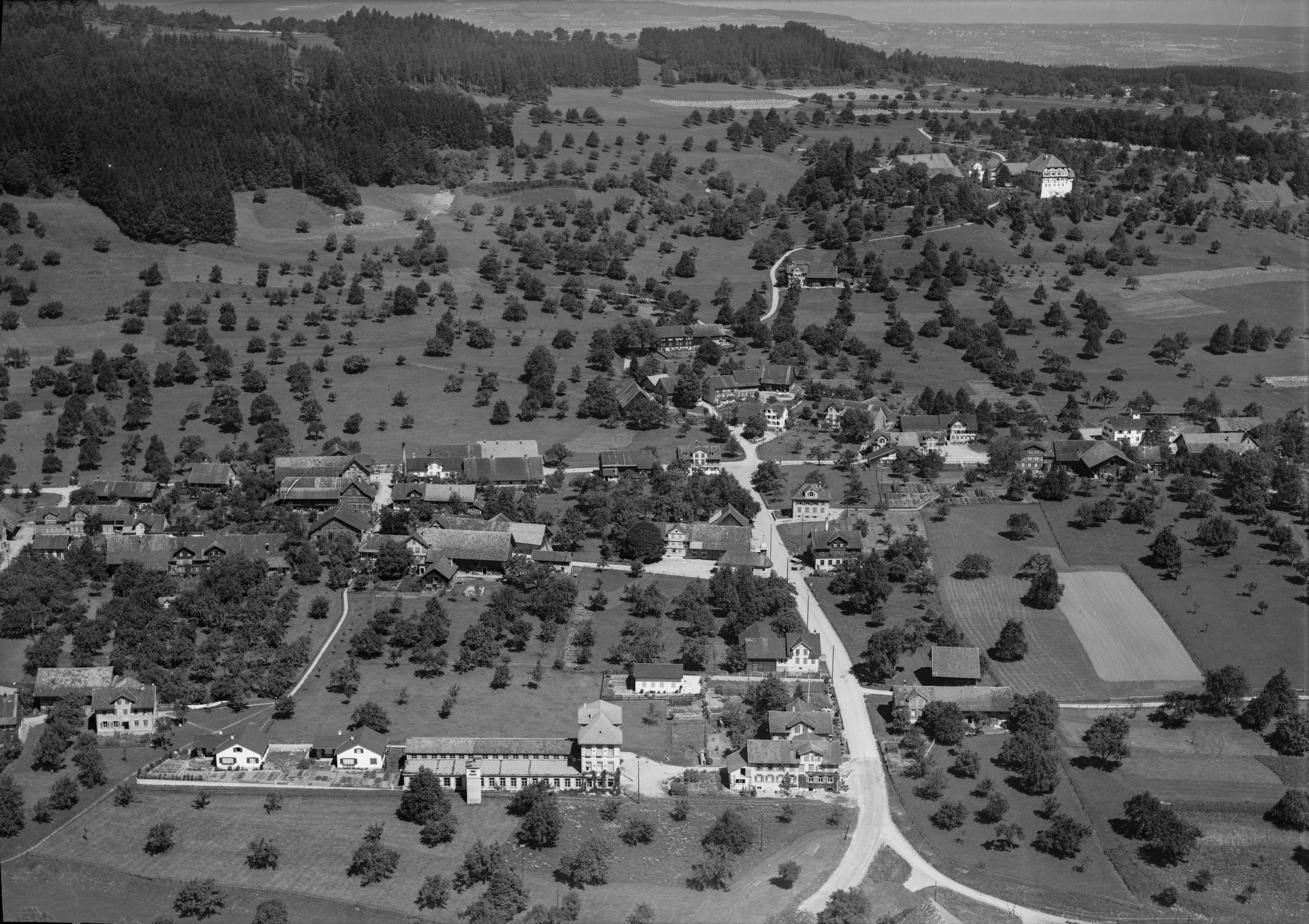
Aerial view (1954)

Niederhelfenschwil has an area, as of 2006, of 16.3 km^{2} (6.3 sq mi). Of this area, 71.1% is used for agricultural purposes, while 19.8% is forested. Of the rest of the land, 8.4% is settled (buildings or roads) and the remainder (0.6%) is non-productive (rivers or lakes).

The municipality is located in the Wil Wahlkreis, north of the Thur river between Bischofszell and Wil. It consists of the villages of Niederhelfenschwil, Lenggenwil and Schloss Zuckenriet as well as the hamlets of Enkhüseren, Dietenwil and Dägetschwil.

== Coat of arms ==
The blazon of the municipal coat of arms is Azure between a Pall Or letters N, L and Z

== Demographics ==
Niederhelfenschwil has a population (as of 31 December 2020) of 3,181. As of 2007, about 5.6% of the population was made up of foreign nationals. Of the foreign population, (as of 2000), 34 are from Germany, 16 are from Italy, 50 are from ex-Yugoslavia, 9 are from Austria, 5 are from Turkey, and 44 are from another country. Over the last 10 years the population has grown at a rate of 11.6%. Most of the population (as of 2000) speaks German (97.0%), with Albanian being second most common ( 1.0%) and Portuguese being third ( 0.4%). Of the Swiss national languages (as of 2000), 2,522 speak German, 2 people speak French, 8 people speak Italian, and 1 person speaks Romansh.

The age distribution, as of 2000, in Niederhelfenschwil is; 475 children or 18.3% of the population are between 0 and 9 years old and 406 teenagers or 15.6% are between 10 and 19. Of the adult population, 279 people or 10.7% of the population are between 20 and 29 years old. 479 people or 18.4% are between 30 and 39, 357 people or 13.7% are between 40 and 49, and 252 people or 9.7% are between 50 and 59. The senior population distribution is 165 people or 6.3% of the population are between 60 and 69 years old, 138 people or 5.3% are between 70 and 79, there are 44 people or 1.7% who are between 80 and 89, and there are 4 people or 0.2% who are between 90 and 99.

In 2000 there were 176 persons (or 6.8% of the population) who were living alone in a private dwelling. There were 464 (or 17.9%) persons who were part of a couple (married or otherwise committed) without children, and 1,847 (or 71.1%) who were part of a couple with children. There were 62 (or 2.4%) people who lived in single parent home, while there are 22 persons who were adult children living with one or both parents, 9 persons who lived in a household made up of relatives, 6 who lived household made up of unrelated persons, and 13 who are either institutionalized or live in another type of collective housing.

In the 2007 federal election the most popular party was the SVP which received 45.1% of the vote. The next three most popular parties were the CVP (23.8%), the FDP (11.6%) and the SP (6.7%).

In Niederhelfenschwil about 77.4% of the population (between age 25-64) have completed either non-mandatory upper secondary education or additional higher education (either university or a Fachhochschule). Out of the total population in Niederhelfenschwil, as of 2000, the highest education level completed by 500 people (19.2% of the population) was Primary, while 949 (36.5%) have completed their secondary education, 274 (10.5%) have attended a Tertiary school, and 55 (2.1%) are not in school. The remainder did not answer this question.

The historical population is given in the following table:

| year | population |
|---|---|
| 1837 | 1,275 |
| 1850 | 1,279 |
| 1900 | 1,250 |
| 1950 | 1,469 |
| 1970 | 1,614 |
| 2000 | 2,599 |

== Heritage sites of national significance ==
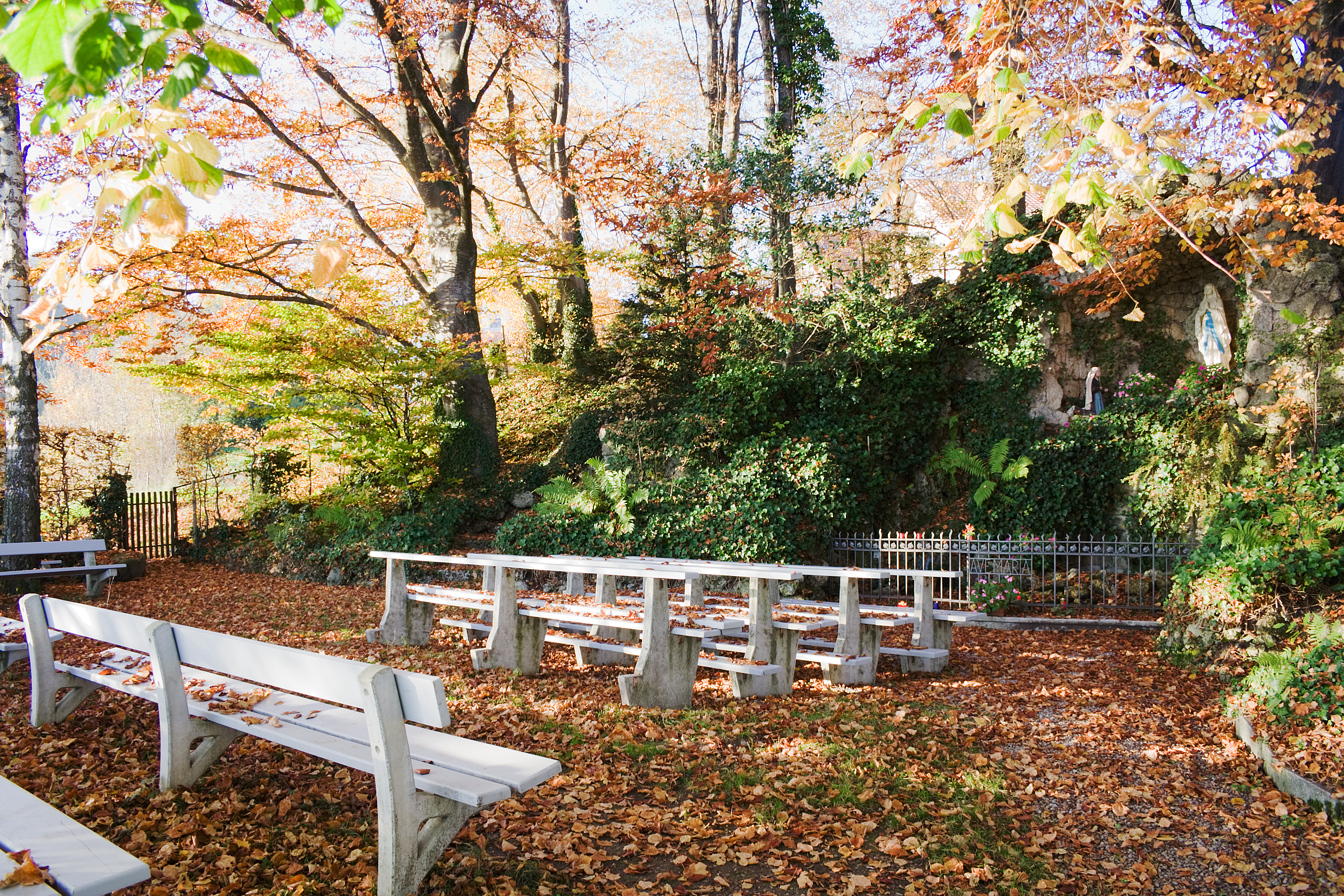
Grotto underneath Schloss Zuckenriet

The Catholic parish church of St. John the Baptist and Zuckenriet Castle are listed as Swiss heritage sites of national significance.

== Economy ==
As of 2007, Niederhelfenschwil had an unemployment rate of 0.84%. As of 2005, there were 254 people employed in the primary economic sector and about 90 businesses involved in this sector. 228 people are employed in the secondary sector and there are 49 businesses in this sector. 286 people are employed in the tertiary sector, with 58 businesses in this sector.

As of October 2009 the average unemployment rate was 2.4%. There were 190 businesses in the municipality of which 42 were involved in the secondary sector of the economy while 62 were involved in the third.

As of 2000 there were 487 residents who worked in the municipality, while 801 residents worked outside Niederhelfenschwil and 231 people commuted into the municipality for work.

== Religion ==
From the 2000 census, 1,798 or 69.2% are Roman Catholic, while 523 or 20.1% belonged to the Swiss Reformed Church. Of the rest of the population, there are 10 individuals (or about 0.38% of the population) who belong to the Orthodox Church, and there are 55 individuals (or about 2.12% of the population) who belong to another Christian church. There are 50 (or about 1.92% of the population) who are Islamic. There are 6 individuals (or about 0.23% of the population) who belong to another church (not listed on the census), 106 (or about 4.08% of the population) belong to no church, are agnostic or atheist, and 51 individuals (or about 1.96% of the population) did not answer the question.
