= Thomas Schmid (rally driver) =

Swiss racing driver

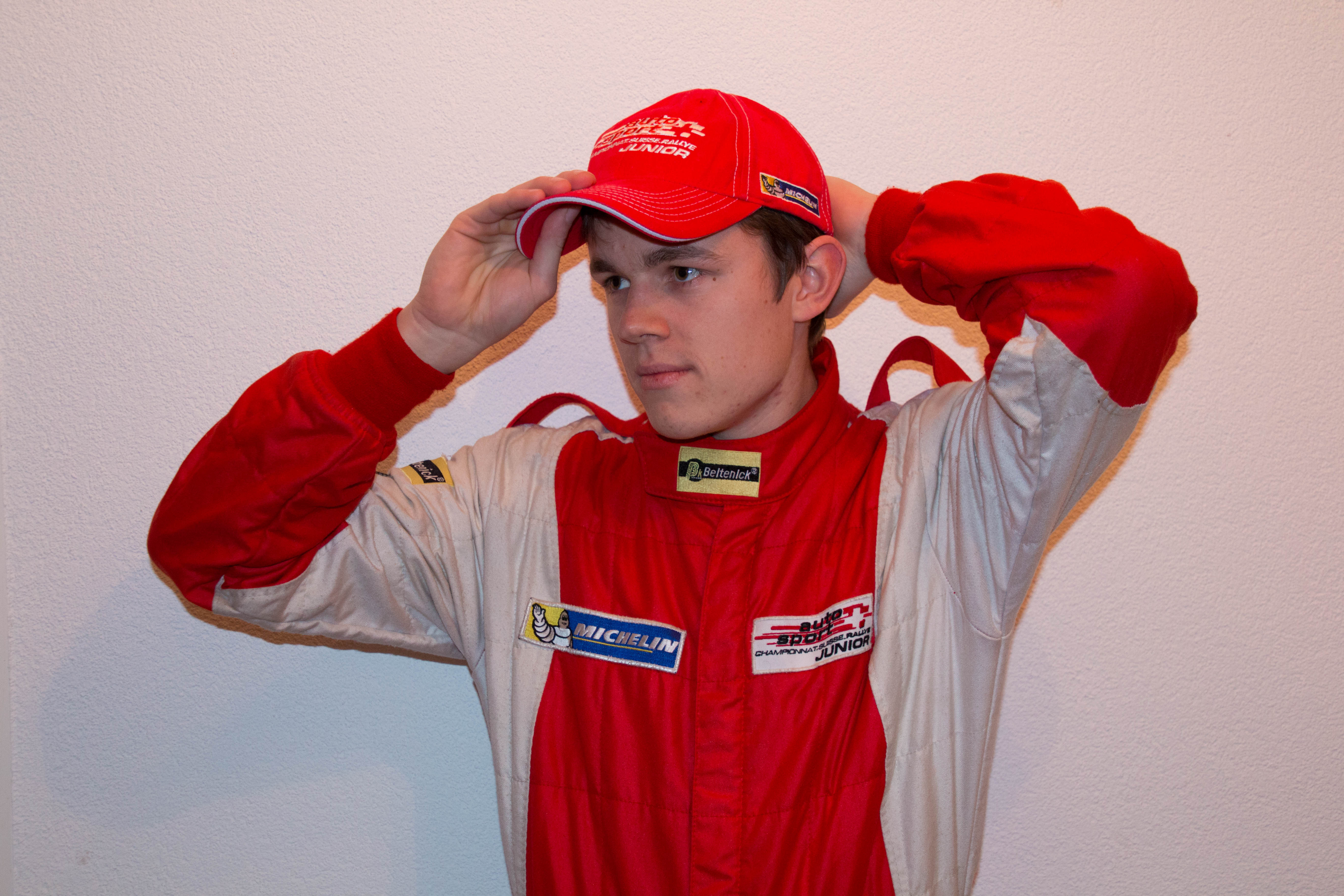
- Born: 6 August 1995 (age 30); Flawil, Switzerland
- Years active: 2011-present
- Height: 1.8 m (5 ft 11 in)

Thomas Schmid (born 6 August 1995 in Flawil) is a Swiss rally and racing driver. He showed his versatility by winning four different Swiss national titles in motorsport (Autocross, Rally, Hillclimb, SimRacing 2x). Further, he won the FIA Alpine Rally Trophy in 2018 in the ERT 3 and ERT Junior Category. He is also driving for the ETH Zürich AMZ Racing team competing in the Formula Student Series.

== Early life ==
Thomas got his interest in motorsport and motorised vehicles early on from his father, who constructed a go-kart for him out of scrap iron. Thomas practised his first drifts in the gravel pit with this machine when he was not even 10 years old.

== Motorsport career ==
=== Autocross ===
By chance, he and his brother discovered autocross. For 50 Swiss Francs they rescued an old Daihatsu Charade from the scrapheap and converted it into a racing car for gravel tracks in many hours of work.

At the age of 15, Thomas drove his first car race in it and landed on the podium straight away. In the following two years, he was able to celebrate the championship title in the youth class.

At the age of 18, he started competing in the adult category. In 2015, he won the Swiss Autocross Championship and became champion in the 3 Nations Cup (Switzerland, Germany and France, after junior wins in 2012 and 2013).

=== Swiss Junior Rally Championships ===
At the age of 20, with autocross success under his belt, Thomas decided to buy a Renault Twingo R1 and compete in the Swiss Junior Rally Championship.

Despite a technical failure on his debut, he went on to win the next two rallies in the R1 category.

However, a heavy crash at Rally Mont-Blanc ended his 2016 season early. For almost five months, Thomas was busy getting the crashed car back in shape for the 2017 season.

The season opener for the Swiss Junior Championship 2017 went ideally with two dominant victories. However, three retirements at the following events dashed all hopes of winning the title.

In 2018, Thomas again took part in the Swiss Rally Championship Junior. This time in the R2 category with a Peugeot 208 R2. After an intense year with a large fight against Jonathan Michellod, he was able to win the title with three victories, despite one engine failure. He also won the FIA Alpine Rally Trophy ERT Junior and ERT 3 titles. After 14 years, a rally title finally found its way back to the German-speaking part of Switzerland. In addition, he was able to write Swiss racing history in 2018. Never before had a driver won two Swiss championships in two different disciplines in the same year.

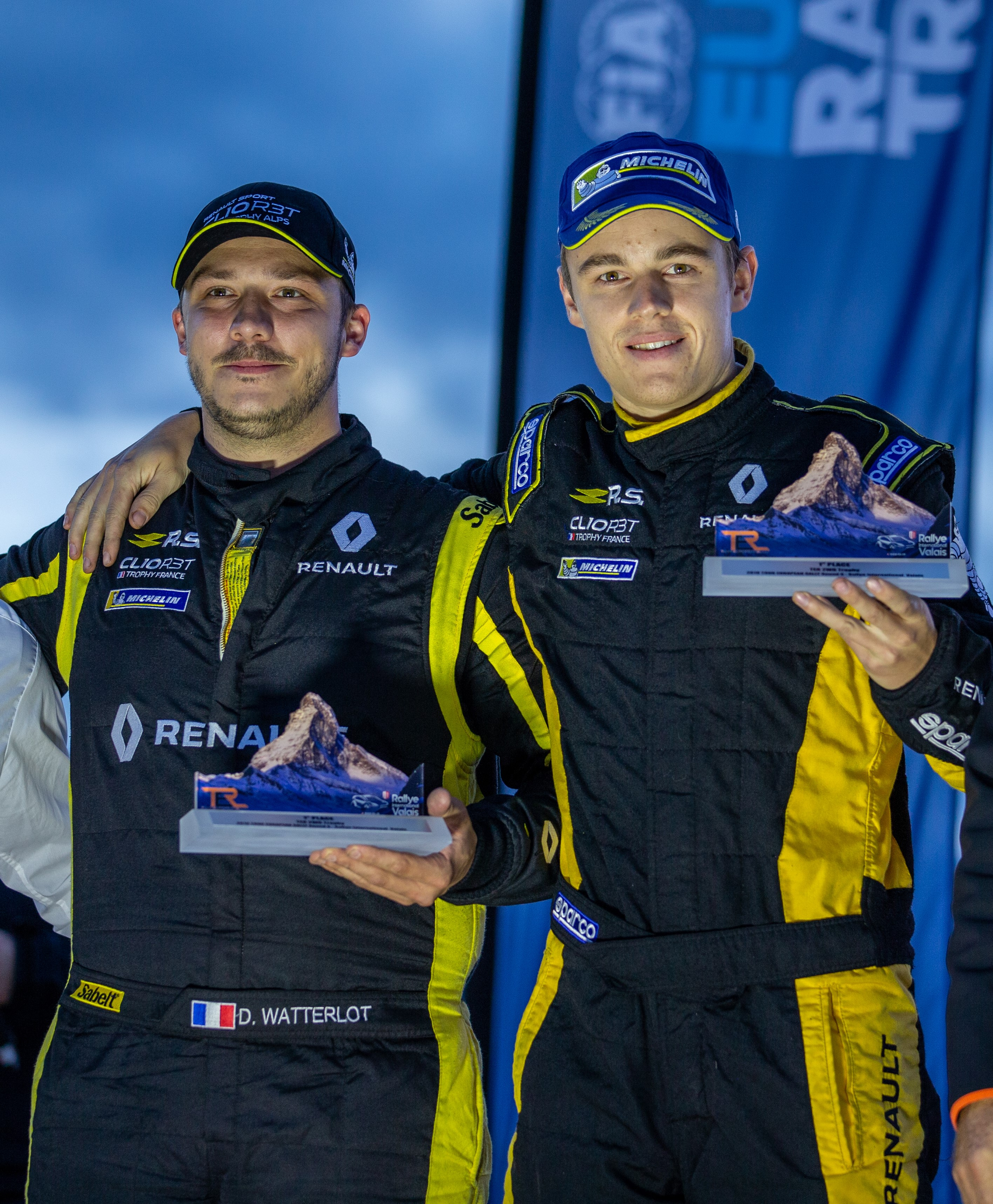
Thomas Schmid with his co-driver Quentin Marchant at the Rallye International du Valais in 2019.

In 2019, Thomas took third place at the Rallye International du Valais in the Clio R3T Alps Trophy. He competed under the official flag of Renault Switzerland as a result of his Junior title in 2018. It was the only major rally for him in 2019 as he started studying and was missing budget.

In 2020, Thomas won the Rallye du Chablais Virtual race.

=== Swiss Junior Hillclimb Championships ===
In January 2018, Thomas qualified for the Swiss Junior Hillclimb Championships at the Swiss-Race-Academy qualifier.

In equal Toyota GT86, he was able to win all four races, set a new track record each time and win the title.

=== SimRacing ===
After an eighth-place finish at the 2019 Swiss Championships, Thomas went on to win the title in the following two years. He is also part of the Simracing team "NIANCO esports" founded by pro racing driver Nico Müller. He competed in the RCCO World eX Championships in 2021.

=== Rallycross ===
In 2018, Thomas won the 6 Horas de Rallycross "Paulo Sérgio" in Lousada, Portugal.

=== Formula Student ===
Since 2019, Thomas has been one of the AutoX and Endurance drivers in the AMZ Racing Team, which competes in international Formula Student events. The most notable success was the overall victory at Formula Student East in 2021 and the second place overall at Formula Student Austria in the same year.

=== Testing ===
In 2019, Thomas was able to test drive a Citroen DS3 WRC for the first time. Further tests with a Ford Fiesta R5 and a Porsche 991.2 GT3 Cup at the Lausitzring followed in 2021.
