= Uzwil =

- Municipality
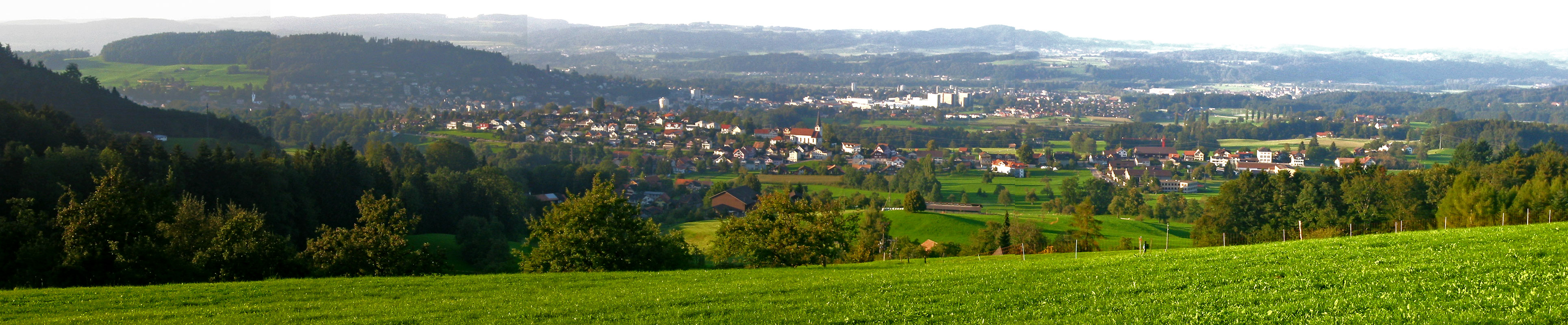

- Coat of arms
- Location of Uzwil
- Location within Switzerland Location within Canton of St. Gallen
- Coordinates: 47°26′13″N 9°08′00″E
- Country: Switzerland
- Canton: St. Gallen
- District: Wahlkreis Wil

Government
  - Mayor: Lucas Keel

Area
  - Total: 14.49 km^{2} (5.59 sq mi)
- Elevation: 560 m (1,840 ft)

Population (December 2020)
  - Total: 13,284
  - Density: 916.8/km^{2} (2,374/sq mi)
- Time zone: UTC+01:00 (CET)
  - Summer (DST): UTC+02:00 (CEST)
- Postal code: 9240
- SFOS number: 3408
- ISO 3166 code: CH-SG
- Surrounded by: Jonschwil, Oberbüren, Oberuzwil, Wil, Zuzwil
- Website: www.uzwil.ch

Uzwil is a municipality in the Wahlkreis (constituency) of Wil in the canton of St. Gallen in Switzerland.

== History ==
Uzwil was first mentioned in 819 as Uzzinwilare. The village of Henau was first mentioned 754 as Villa Aninauva at the Monastery of St. Gallen in the "Henau document" (Henauer Urkunde).

== Geography ==
Uzwil has an area, as of 2006, of 14.5 km^{2} (5.6 sq mi). Of this area, 53.7% is used for agricultural purposes, while 17.9% is forested. Of the rest of the land, 26.8% is settled (buildings or roads) and the remainder (1.7%) is non-productive (rivers or lakes).

The municipality consists of the villages Niederuzwil, Uzwil, Henau, Algetshausen, Niederstetten, Oberstetten and Stolzenberg. It is located in the northern Toggenburg between Wil and Gossau.

Aerial view (1949)

== Coat of arms ==
The blazon of the municipal coat of arms is Azure a lower semi Mill Wheel and above it Ears of Wheat Or.

== Demographics ==
Uzwil has a population (as of 31 December 2020) of 13,284. As of 2007, about 25.1% of the population was made up of foreign nationals. Of the foreign population, (as of 2000), 198 are from Germany, 400 are from Italy, 1,587 are from ex-Yugoslavia, 74 are from Austria, 202 are from Turkey, and 270 are from another country. Over the last 10 years the population has grown at a rate of 7.7%. Most of the population (as of 2000) speaks German (86.2%), with Serbo-Croatian being second most common (4.3%) and Albanian being third (3.0%). Of the Swiss national languages (as of 2000), 10,321 speak German, 45 people speak French, 310 people speak Italian, and 21 people speak Romansh.

The age distribution, as of 2000, in Uzwil is; 1,558 children or 13.0% of the population are between 0 and 9 years old and 1,688 teenagers or 14.1% are between 10 and 19. Of the adult population, 1,483 people or 12.4% of the population are between 20 and 29 years old. 1,870 people or 15.6% are between 30 and 39, 1,754 people or 14.6% are between 40 and 49, and 1,440 people or 12.0% are between 50 and 59. The senior population distribution is 1,002 people or 8.4% of the population are between 60 and 69 years old, 719 people or 6.0% are between 70 and 79, there are 392 people or 3.3% who are between 80 and 89, and there are 69 people or 0.6% who are between 90 and 99, and 2 people who are 100 or more.

In 2000 there were 1,334 people (or 11.1% of the population) who were living alone in a private dwelling. There were 2,635 (or 22.0%) people who were part of a couple (married or otherwise committed) without children, and 6,936 (or 57.9%) who were part of a couple with children. There were 575 (or 4.8%) people who lived in a single parent home, while there were 64 people who were adult children living with one or both parents, 24 people who lived in a household made up of relatives, 96 who lived in a household made up of unrelated people, and 313 who are either institutionalized or live in another type of collective housing.

In the 2007 federal election the most popular party was the SVP which received 36.2% of the vote. The next three most popular parties were the CVP (19.4%), the FDP (16.7%) and the SP (13.4%).

In Uzwil about 67.5% of the population (between age 25-64) have completed either non-mandatory upper secondary education or additional higher education (either university or a Fachhochschule). Out of the total population in Uzwil, as of 2000, the highest education level completed by 2,754 people (23.0% of the population) was Primary, while 4,328 (36.1%) have completed their secondary education, 1,207 (10.1%) have attended a Tertiary school, and 548 (4.6%) are not in school. The remainder did not answer this question.

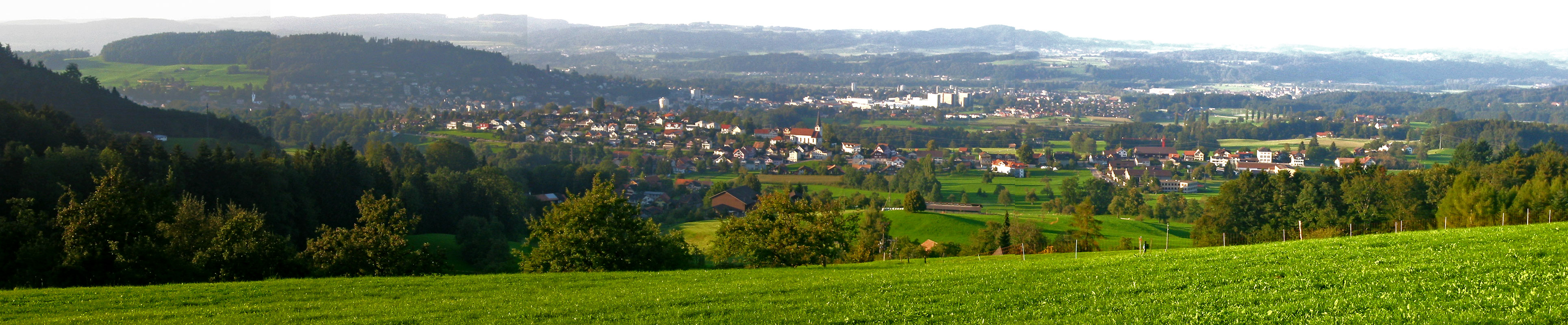
Panorama of Uzwil-Oberuzwil. In the foreground: Bichwil; background (left to right): Oberuzwil, Uzwil, Industrie Uzwil, Niederuzwil

== Heritage sites of national significance ==
The Hauser & Wirth Collection Henau at Felseggstrasse 51 and the Villa Waldbühl on Waldbühl 996 are listed as Swiss heritage sites of national significance.

== Economy ==
As of 2007, Uzwil had an unemployment rate of 2.58%. As of 2005, there were 141 people employed in the primary economic sector and about 50 businesses involved in this sector. 4,126 people are employed in the secondary sector and there are 101 businesses in this sector. 2,179 people are employed in the tertiary sector, with 307 businesses in this sector.

As of October 2009 the average unemployment rate was 5.0%. There were 451 businesses in the municipality of which 104 were involved in the secondary sector of the economy while 303 were involved in the third.

As of 2000 there were 2,837 residents who worked in the municipality, while 3,232 residents worked outside Uzwil and 3,763 people commuted into the municipality for work.

The largest company in Uzwil is Bühler AG.

== Transportation ==
Uzwil railway station is on the St. Gallen–Winterthur railway line. A second station on the same line, Algetshausen-Henau, is closed since December 2013. The municipality is served by bus routes of PostBus Switzerland.

Uzwil is on the A1-Autobahn Geneva–St. Margrethen.

== Religion ==
From the 2000 census, 5,446 or 45.5% are Roman Catholic, while 3,521 or 29.4% belonged to the Swiss Reformed Church. Of the rest of the population, there is 1 individual who belongs to the Christian Catholic faith, there are 552 individuals (or about 4.61% of the population) who belong to the Orthodox Church, and there are 357 individuals (or about 2.98% of the population) who belong to another Christian church. There are 887 (or about 7.41% of the population) who are Islamic. There are 82 individuals (or about 0.68% of the population) who belong to another church (not listed on the census), 776 (or about 6.48% of the population) belong to no church, are agnostic or atheist, and 355 individuals (or about 2.96% of the population) did not answer the question.

== Notable people ==
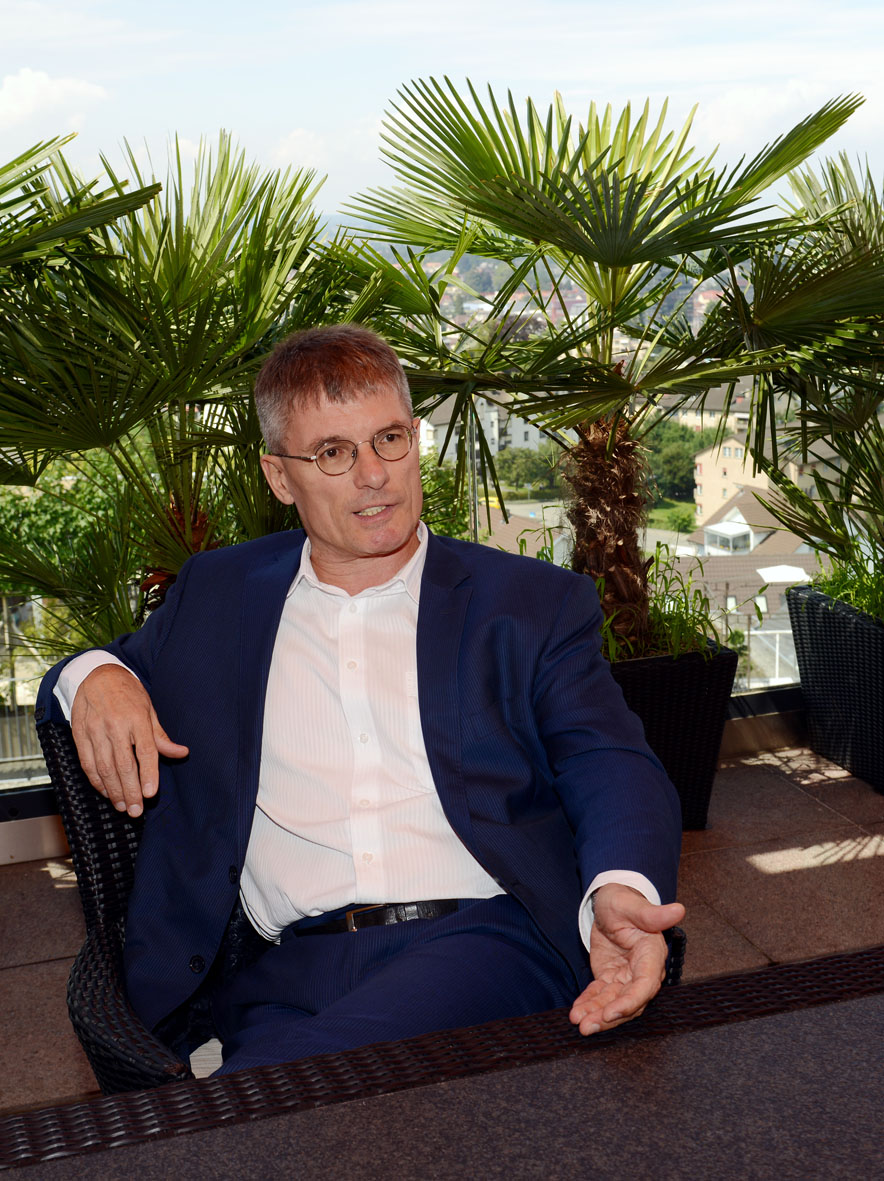
Marcel Niederer, 2013

- Marcelle Bühler (1913 in Uzwil – 2002) a Swiss alpine skier, competed in the 1936 Winter Olympics
- Heidi Wunderli-Allenspach (born 1947 in Niederuzwil) Swiss biologist and first women rektor of ETH Zurich
- Marcel Niederer (born 1960) a Swiss entrepreneur and former ice hockey player, brought up in Uzwil
- Ralph Stöckli (born 1976 in Uzwil) a Swiss curler, competed in the 2006 Winter Olympics
- Ivan Martić (born 1990 in Uzwil) a Swiss–Croatian professional footballer, over 200 club caps
- Kevin Fiala (born 1996), Swiss hockey player in the National Hockey League
