= Au SG railway station =

Railway station in Switzerland

Au SG
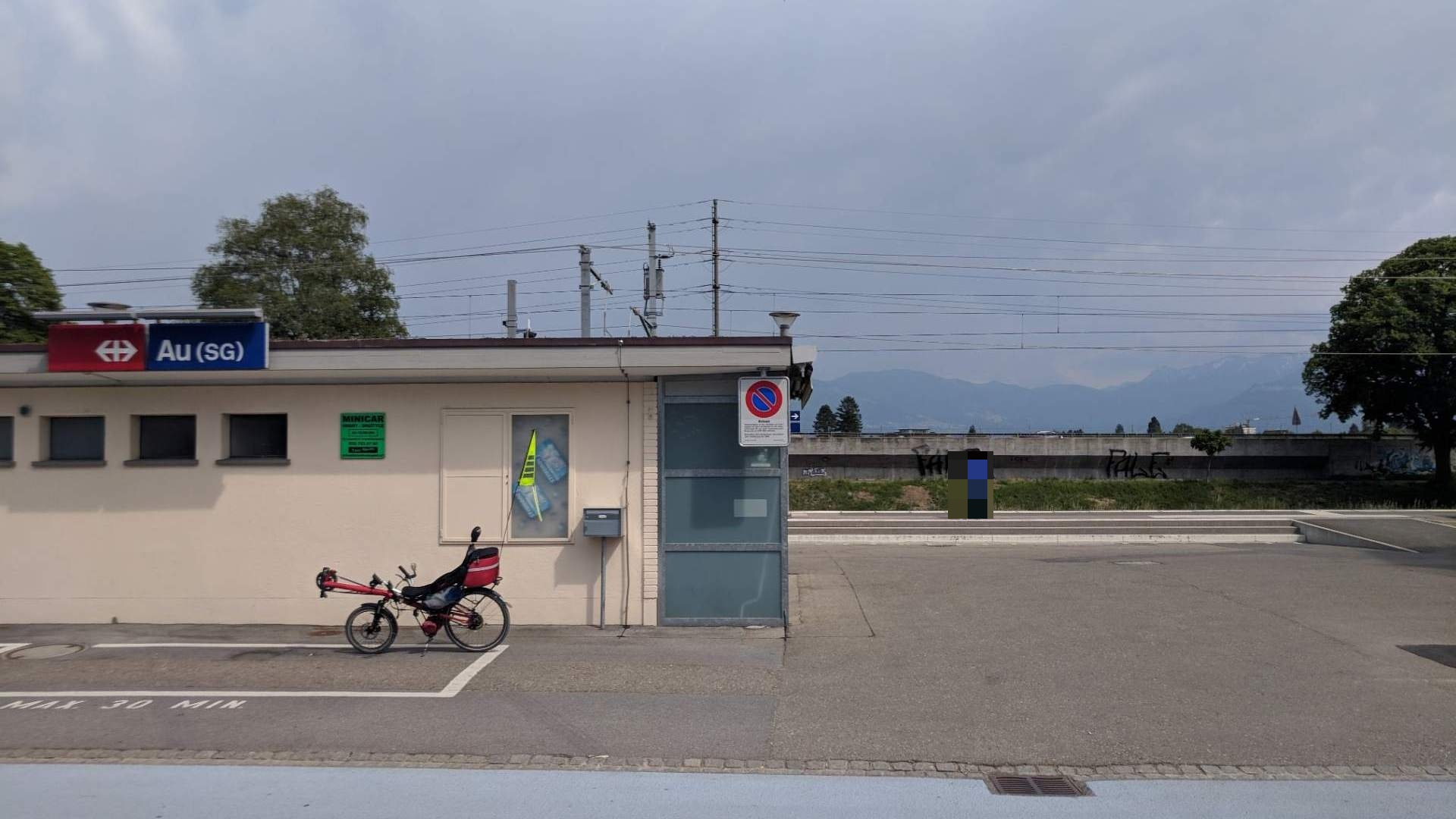
- The station building in 2018

General information
- Location: Au; Switzerland
- Coordinates: 47°26′N 9°38′E
- Elevation: 405 m (1,329 ft)
- Owner: Swiss Federal Railways
- Line: Chur–Rorschach line
- Train operators: Thurbo; Südostbahn

Other information
- Fare zone: 234 / 235 (Tarifverbund Ostwind)

Services
Preceding station	St. Gallen S-Bahn	Following station
St. Margrethen towards Nesslau-Neu St. Johann	S2	Heerbrugg towards Altstätten SG
St. Margrethen towards Rapperswil	S4	Heerbrugg towards Sargans
St. Margrethen towards Winterthur	SN22 Limited service	Heerbrugg Terminus
Location
- Location within Switzerland Location within Canton of St. Gallen

Au SG railway station (German: Bahnhof Au SG) is a railway station in Au, in the Swiss canton of St. Gallen (abbreviated to SG). It is an intermediate stop on the Chur–Rorschach line.

== Services ==
As of the December 2023 timetable change, the following services stop at Au SG:

- St. Gallen S-Bahn S2 / S4: half-hourly service between Wattwil and Altstätten SG via St. Gallen and hourly service to Rapperswil, Sargans, and Nesslau-Neu St. Johann.

During weekends, the station is served by a nighttime S-Bahn service (SN22), offered by Ostwind fare network, and operated by Thurbo for St. Gallen S-Bahn.

- St. Gallen S-Bahn SN22: hourly service to Winterthur and to Heerbrugg, via St. Gallen.

== See also ==
- Bodensee S-Bahn
- Rail transport in Switzerland
