= Franz Christoph Rinck von Baldenstein =

Swiss Roman Catholic auxiliary bishop of Eichstätt (1641–1707)

- Titular bishop of Amyclae; Auxiliary bishop of Eichstätt
- Church: Catholic Church
- Other post: Provost of St. Nicholas at Spalt

Orders
- Ordination: 1664
- Consecration: 1684

Personal details
- Born: 21 January 1641 Jonschwil, Old Swiss Confederacy
- Died: 6 May 1707 (aged 66) Eichstätt, Bavaria

Franz Christoph Rinck von Baldenstein (21 January 1641 – 6 May 1707) was a Swiss Roman Catholic prelate who served as auxiliary bishop of Eichstätt.

== Biography ==
Rinck von Baldenstein was born on 21 January 1641 at Jonschwil, the son of Ignaz Balthasar Rinck von Baldenstein and brother of Georg Wilhelm Rinck von Baldenstein. He became a canon of the cathedral chapter of Basel in 1655 and a non-capitular canon of Eichstätt by papal provision in 1657. He studied with the Jesuits at Freiburg im Breisgau in 1657 and at the Collegium Germanicum in Rome from 1661 to 1664, and was ordained a priest in 1664.

Rinck von Baldenstein was a capitular canon of Basel from 1665 to 1687 and of Eichstätt from 1671. In 1684 he became auxiliary bishop of Eichstätt and titular bishop of Amyclae, and was granted the provostry of the collegiate church of St. Nicholas at Spalt in Bavaria. He was a councillor of the prince-bishop and president of the ecclesiastical council of Eichstätt.

== Bibliography ==
- E. Gatz, Die Bischöfe des Heiligen Römischen Reiches 1648 bis 1803, 377
- C. Bosshart-Pfluger, Das Basler Domkapitel von seiner Übersiedlung nach Arlesheim bis zur Säkularisation (1678–1803), 1983, 276–277
- H. A. Braun, Das Domkapitel zu Eichstätt, 1991, 425–426
