= Flawil railway station =

Railway station in Switzerland

Flawil
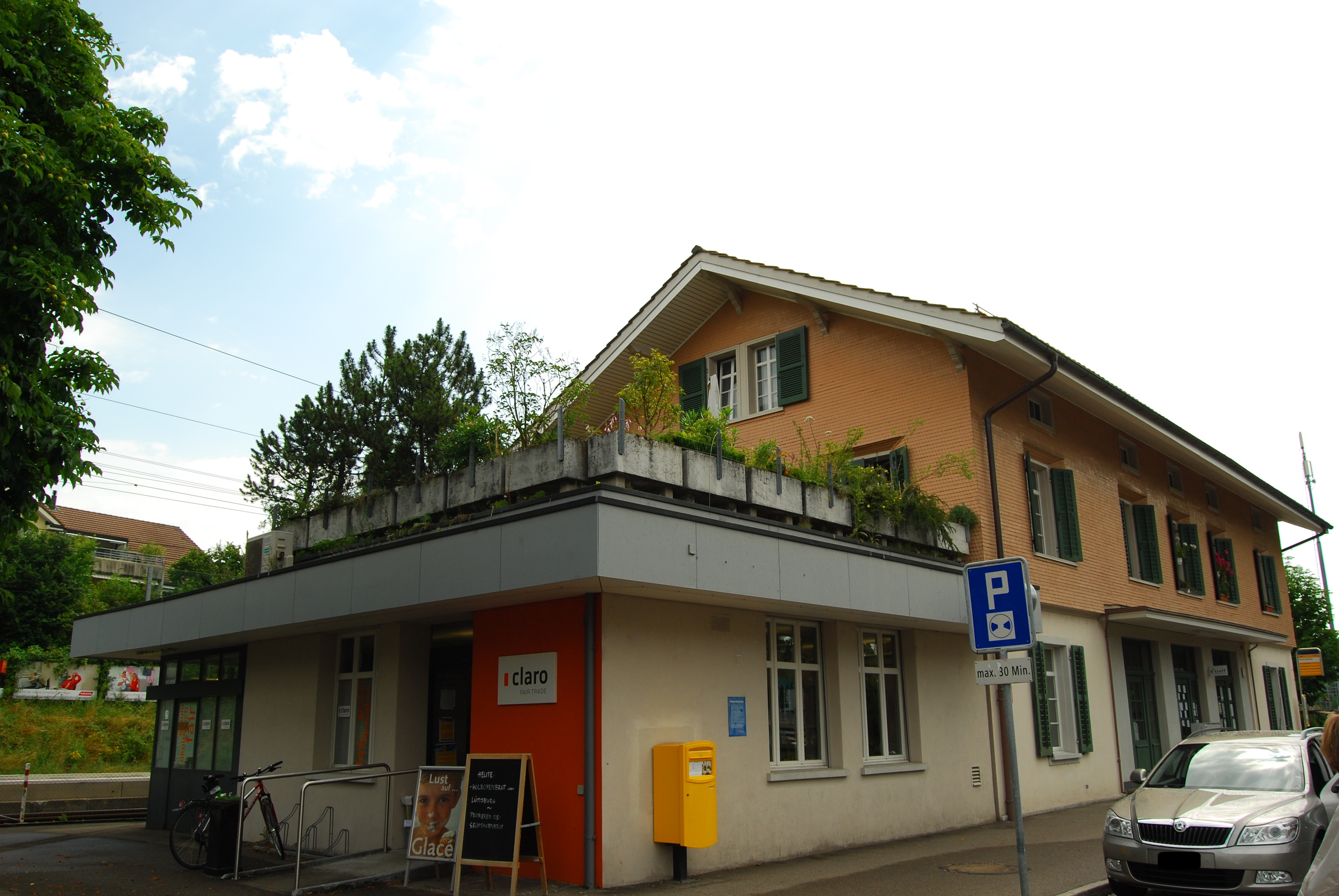
- The Flawil station building in 2011

General information
- Location: Flawil; Switzerland
- Coordinates: 47°24′55″N 9°11′23″E
- Elevation: 610 m (2,000 ft)
- Owner: Swiss Federal Railways
- Line: St. Gallen–Winterthur line
- Distance: 95.3 km (59.2 mi) from Sargans
- Train operators: Swiss Federal Railways; Thurbo
- Connections: PostAuto Schweiz bus lines

Other information
- Fare zone: 214 (Tarifverbund Ostwind)

Passengers
- 2018: 4,100 per weekday

Services
Preceding station	SBB CFF FFS	Following station
Uzwil towards Geneva Airport	IC 1	Gossau SG towards St. Gallen
Uzwil towards Zürich HB	IR 13	Gossau SG towards Sargans
Preceding station	St. Gallen S-Bahn	Following station
Uzwil towards Wil	S1	Gossau SG towards Schaffhausen
Uzwil towards Winterthur	SN21 Limited service	Gossau SG towards St. Gallen
Uzwil towards Winterthur	SN22 Limited service	Gossau SG towards Heerbrugg
Location
- Location within Switzerland Location within Canton of St. Gallen

Flawil railway station (German: Bahnhof Flawil) is a railway station in Flawil, in the Swiss canton of St. Gallen. It is an intermediate station on the St. Gallen–Winterthur line.

== Services ==
As of the December 2020 timetable change, Flawil is served by two long-distance SBB services, both of which run hourly and operate over the St. Gallen–Winterthur line, combining for half-hourly service between Zürich and St. Gallen:

- /: half-hourly service between Zürich Hauptbahnhof and St. Gallen and hourly service to Geneva Airport and Chur.
- St. Gallen S-Bahn S1: half-hourly service over the St. Gallen–Winterthur line between Wil and Schaffhausen via St. Gallen, supplementing the long-distance services.

During weekends, the station is served by two nighttime S-Bahn services (SN21, SN22), offered by Ostwind fare network, and operated by Thurbo for St. Gallen S-Bahn.

- St. Gallen S-Bahn:
  - SN21: hourly service to Winterthur and to St. Gallen.
  - SN22: hourly service to Winterthur and to Heerbrugg (via St. Gallen).

== See also ==
- Rail transport in Switzerland
