= St. Gallen–Winterthur railway line =

Railway line in Switzerland

St. Gallen–Winterthur railway
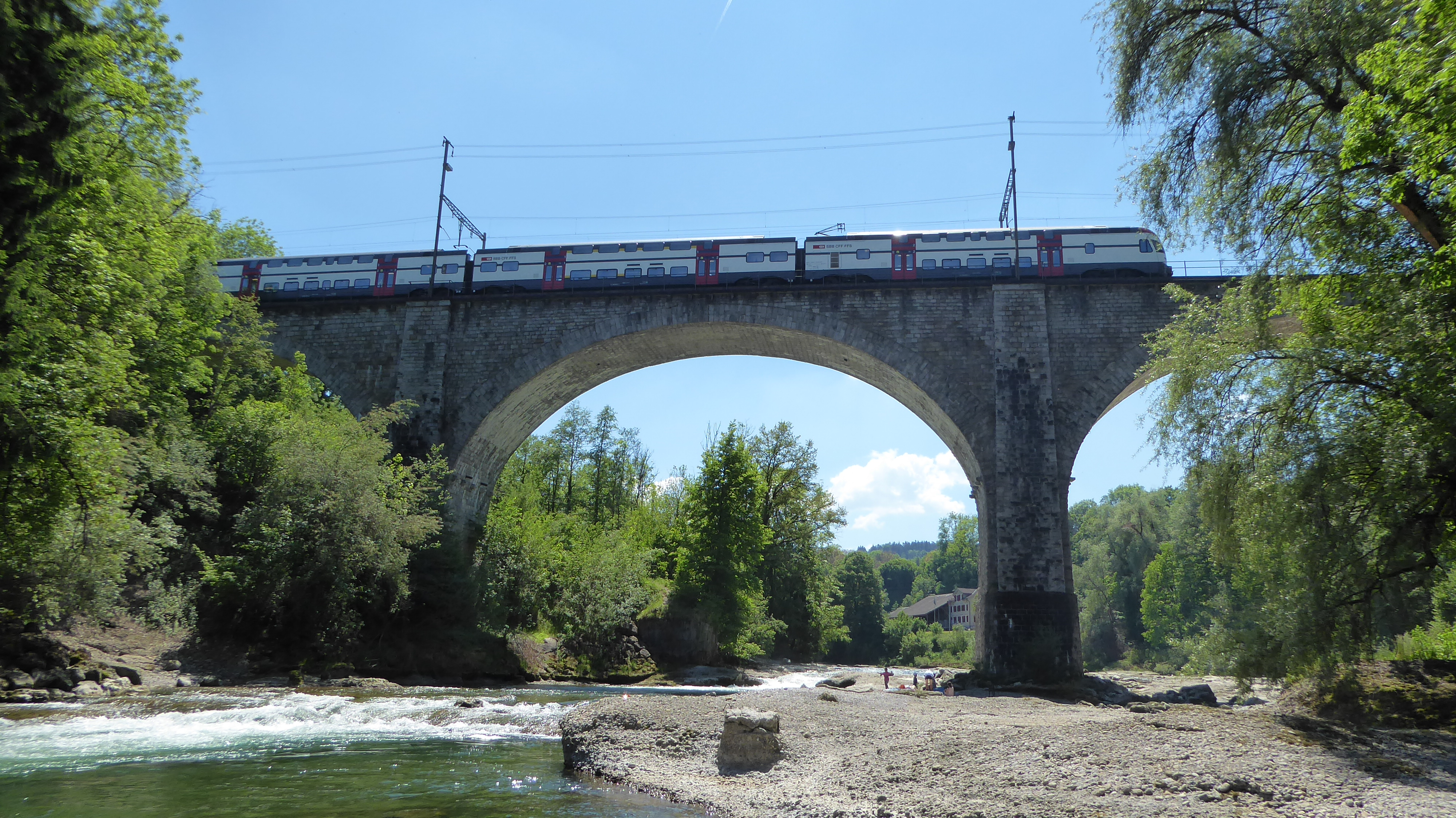
- Thur bridge at Schwarzenbach with a Stadler KISS running as the Rheintal-Express: Wil–St. Gallen–Chur

Overview
- Line number: 850
- Locale: Switzerland
- Termini: St. Gallen; Winterthur

Technical
- Line length: 57.1 km (35.5 mi)
- Track gauge: 1,435 mm (4 ft 8 1/2 in)
- Electrification: 15 kV/16.7 Hz AC overhead catenary
- Maximum incline: 1.6%

The St. Gallen–Winterthur railway line is a standard gauge railway line between St. Gallen and Winterthur, connecting the Swiss cantons of St. Gallen, Thurgau and Zürich. The 57.1 km (35.5 mi) long line was opened between 1855 and 1856 in four stages by the former St. Gallen-Appenzell Railway (St. Gallisch-Appenzellische Eisenbahn, SGAE) and belongs to the Swiss Federal Railways (SBB). It is part of the West-East main line in Switzerland.

== History ==
=== Construction and opening ===
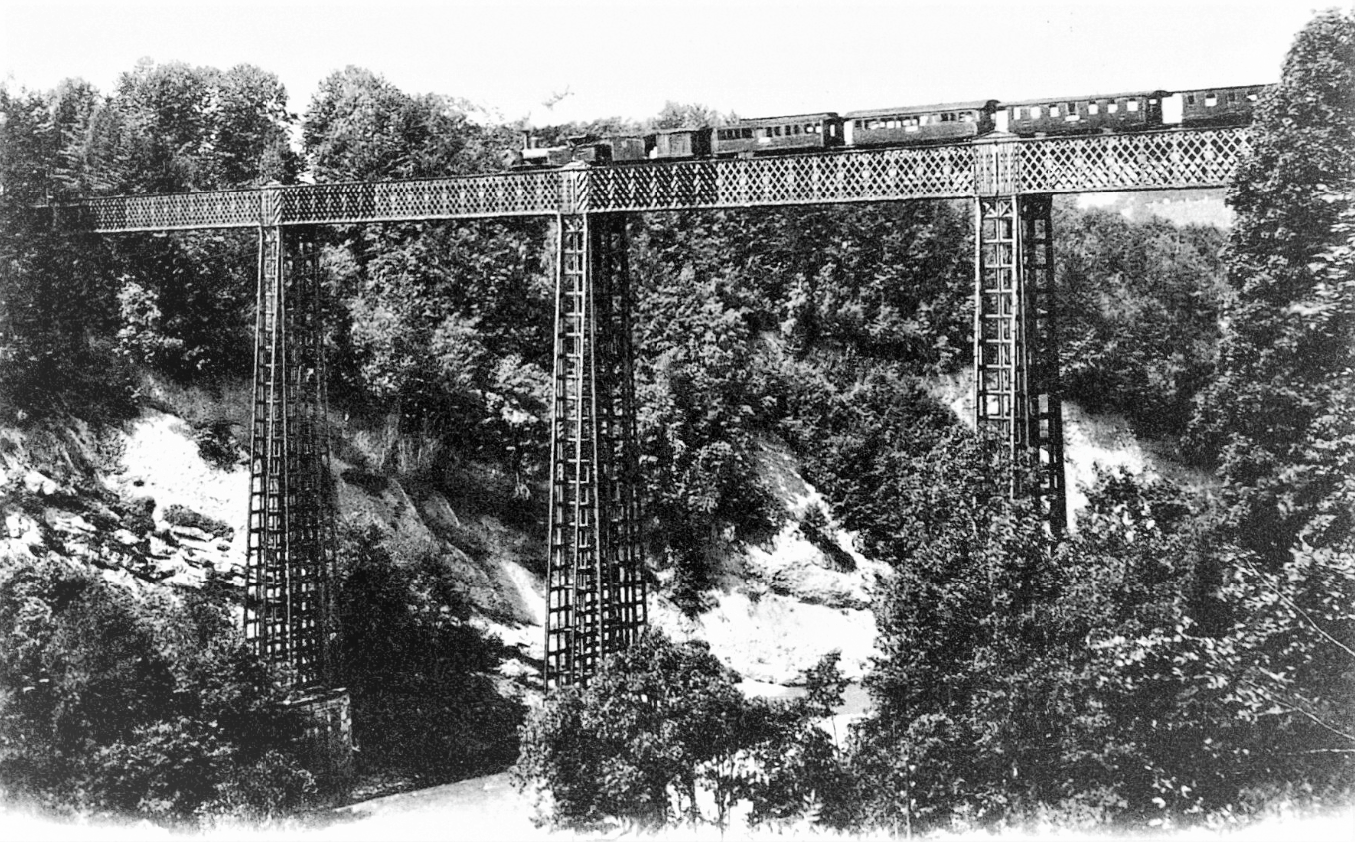
Original Sitter Viaduct with a lattice girder. The bridges over the Glatt, the Uze and the Thur were built according to the same design principles.

The Canton of Thurgau initially refused to grant a concession for the line on its territory, as the route would not have favoured Thurgau. The Swiss Northeastern Railway (Die Schweizerische Nordostbahn) operated the competing Winterthur–Romanshorn railway through the Thurgau.

The Winterthur–Wil–Thur bridge section at Schwarzenbach was built by Julius Herz. The Winterthur–Wil section was opened on 14 October 1855. The journey time was 40 minutes.

The line between Wil and Flawil was hotly debated. The SGAE applied for a concession for the easily-built route south of Uzwil’s local hill, the Vogelsberg, from Schwarzenbach via the Bettenauer Weiher and Oberuzwil to Flawil. Commercial interests preferred a route north of the Vogelsberg so that Uzwil could have a station. So the line was built with a tight S-curve on the edge of the Vogelsberg, where Uzwil station was later built. As a result, this S-curve is today one of the slowest sections of the whole line and the tightest curve on a relatively high-speed line in Switzerland. The Wil–Flawil section was opened on 25 December 1855.

After the construction of the Glatt bridge at Egg between Flawil and Gossau was completed on 15 February 1856, the line reached Gossau and Winkeln. Finally, the line was extended to the town of St. Gallen on 24 March 1856. For this purpose, an iron lattice bridge designed by Karl Etzel was built over the Sitter, the original Sitter Viaduct.

=== Further development ===
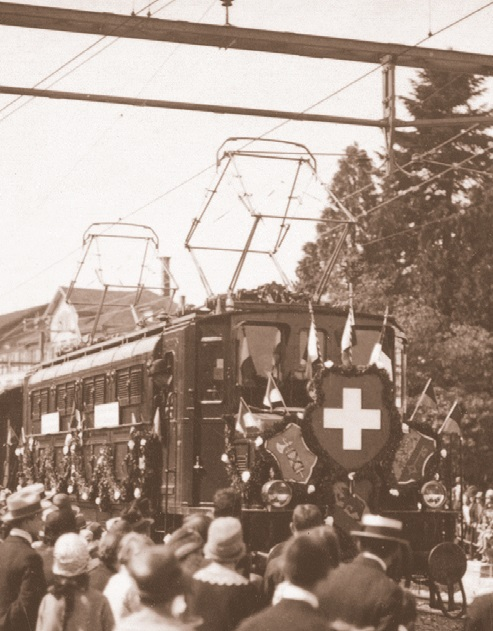
Commencement of electric operations in 1927 with an Ae 3/6 I locomotive in Flawil

A train coming from Winterthur derailed in Vonwil near St. Gallen on 31 December 1879. The two locomotives came to lie on the left and right of the railway track and the carriages were pushed into each other. The accident caused two deaths and several were injured, some seriously.

The route became part of the Swiss Federal Railways on 1 July 1902 when the national railways were nationalised. Starting in 1903, the SBB duplicated the line in stages and electrified it in 1927 at 15,000 Volt 16 2/3 Hz. At the same time, the Algetshausen-Henau halt was opened and the Bühler industrial railway in Uzwil was handed over to the company.

The Winterthur Hegi halt was opened in December 2006 as part of the expansion of the Zürich S-Bahn. Algetshausen-Henau and Schwarzenbach stations were closed in 2013.

== Operations ==
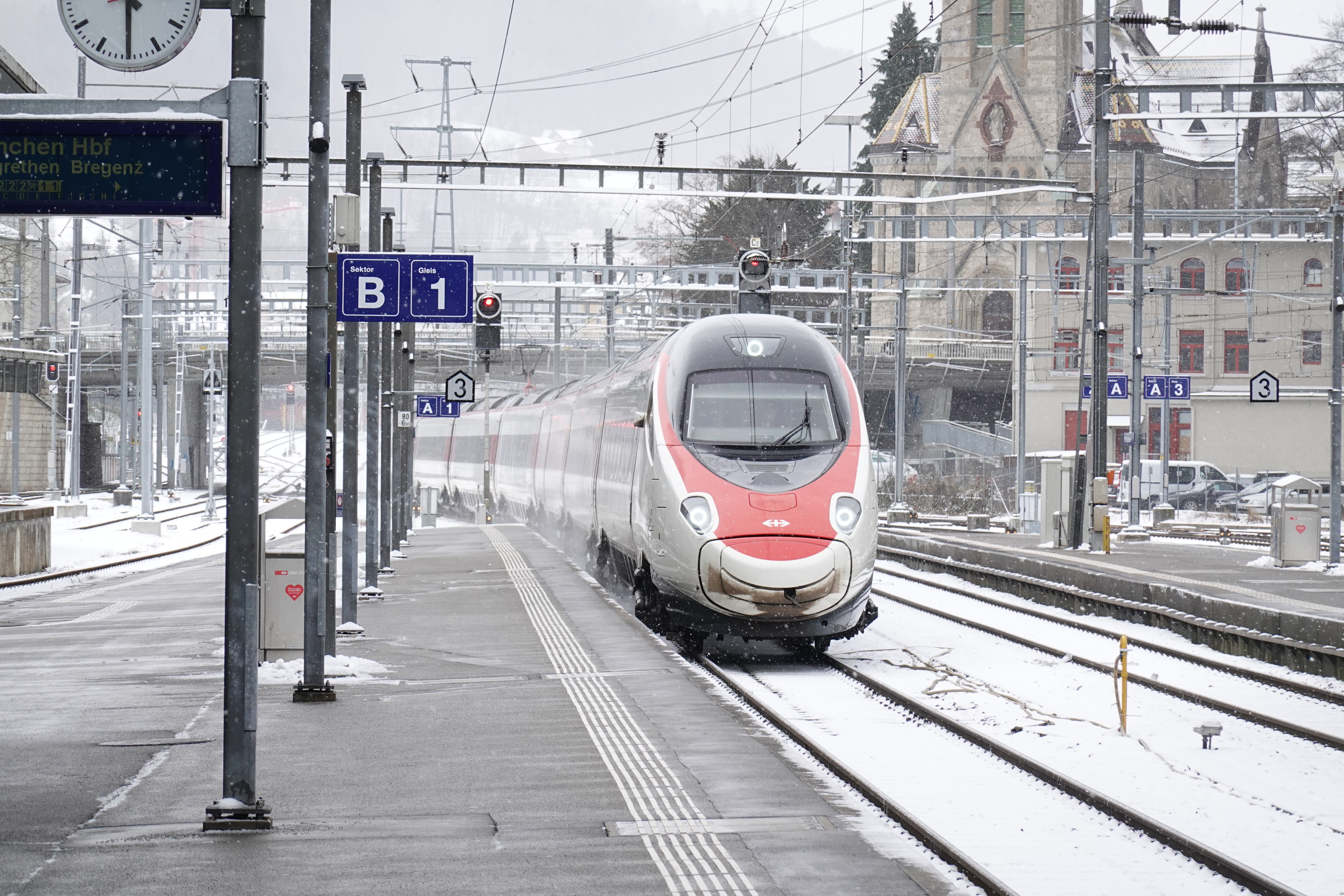
ETR 610 of Swiss Federal Railways as EuroCity at St. Gallen station

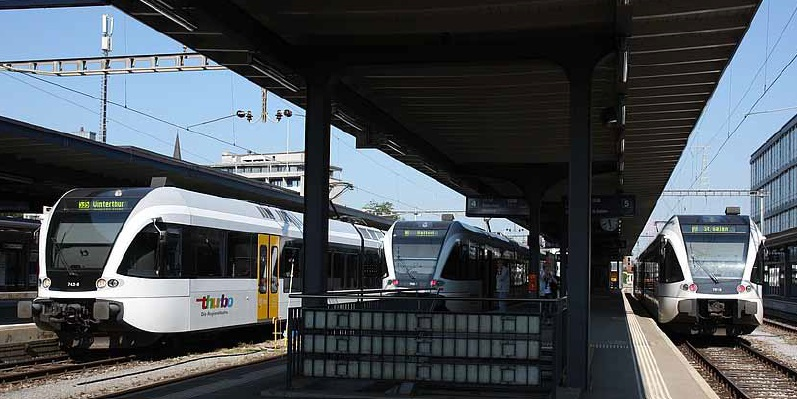
S-Bahn services operated by Thurbo at Wil station

In long-distance national traffic, the line is part of the West-East axis between St. Gallen and Geneva operated by InterCity (IC) trains. It is also used by international EuroCity (EC) trains (München Hbf–Bregenz–Zürich HB). In regional traffic, the line is used by InterRegio (IR) trains (Zürich HB–Sargans; replacing the former Rheintal-Express, REX). In local traffic, the line is served by S-Bahn services: the S1 (between St. Gallen and Wil, until 2018 with additional services in the peak-hour as former line S11) and S5 (between St. Gallen and Gossau) of St. Gallen S-Bahn and the S12 and S35 (both between Winterthur and Wil) of Zurich S-Bahn.

As of the December 2023 timetable change, the following services use the railway line:

- Long distance:
  - EC/ECE 88: Zürich HB – Zürich Airport – Winterthur – St. Gallen – St. Margrethen – Bregenz – Lindau-Reutin – Memmingen – Buchloe – München Hbf
  - Geneva Airport – Geneva – Lausanne – Bern – Olten – Zürich HB – Zürich Airport – Winterthur – Wil – Uzwil – Flawil – Gossau – St. Gallen
  - Geneva Airport/Lausanne – Yverdon-les-Bains – Biel/Bienne – Olten – Zürich HB – Zürich Airport – Winterhur – St. Gallen (– Rorschach)
- Regional:
  - Chur – Landquart – Sargans – Buchs SG – Altstätten SG – St. Margrethen – Rorschach – St. Gallen – Gossau – Flawil – Uzwil – Wil – Winterthur – Zürich HB
- St. Gallen S-Bahn:
  - S1 Wil – Gossau – St. Gallen – Romanshorn – Kreuzlingen – Stein am Rhein – Diessenhofen – Schaffhausen
  - S5 St. Margrethen – Rorschach – St. Gallen – Gossau – Sulgen – Weinfelden
- Zurich S-Bahn:
  - S12 Brugg AG–Zürich HB–Zürich Stettbach– Winterthur–Schaffhausen/Wil SG
    Operates non stop between Stettbach and Winterthur; the lines to Schaffhausen and Wil SG are operated alternately at hourly intervals.
  - S35 Winterthur–Wil SG
