= Uzwil railway station =

Railway station in Switzerland

Uzwil
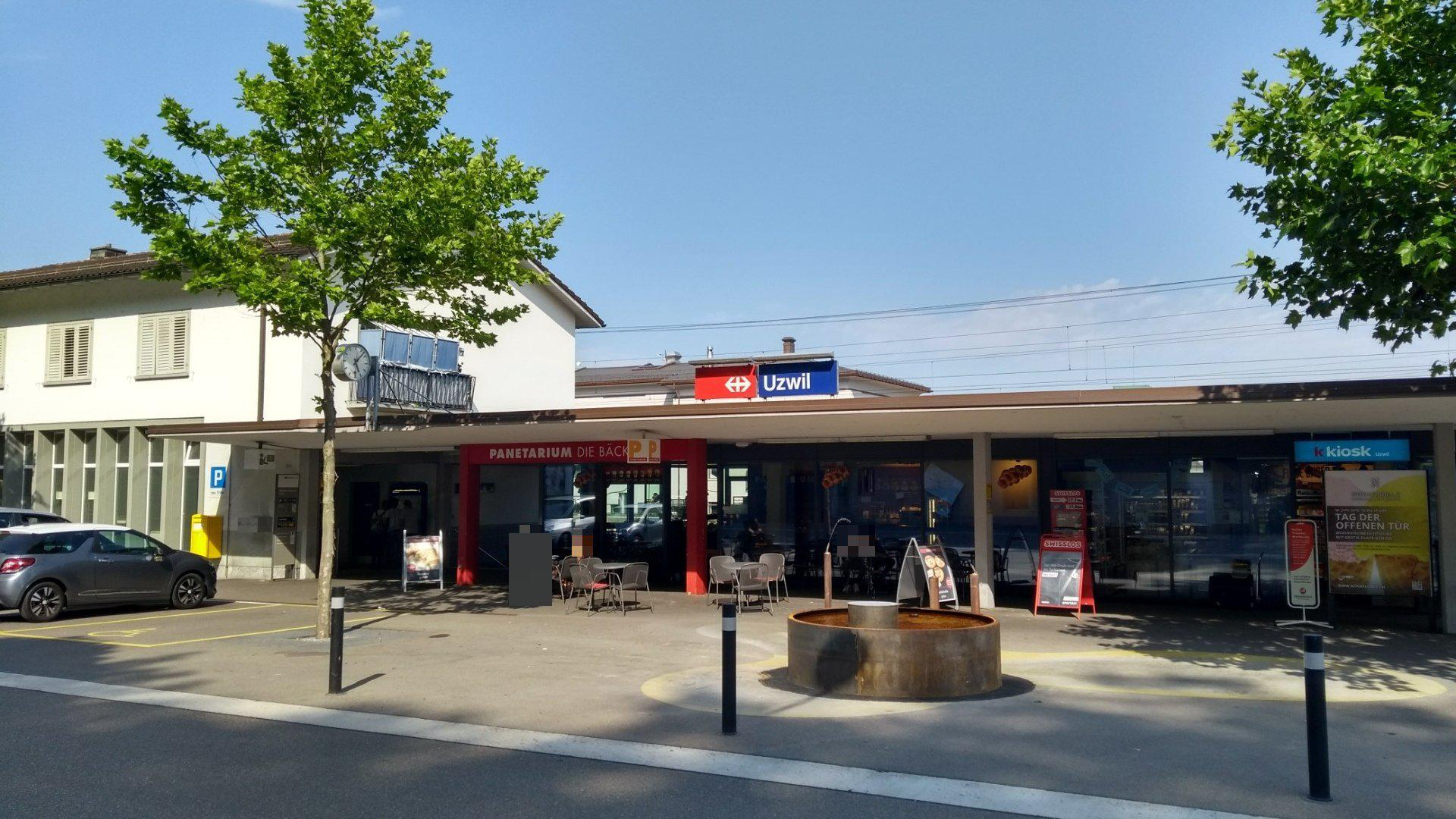
- The station building in 2018

General information
- Location: Uzwil; Switzerland
- Coordinates: 47°26′11″N 9°07′52″E
- Elevation: 563 m (1,847 ft)
- Owner: Swiss Federal Railways
- Line: St. Gallen–Winterthur line
- Distance: 100.9 km (62.7 mi) from Sargans
- Train operators: Swiss Federal Railways; Thurbo
- Connections: PostAuto Schweiz bus lines

Other information
- Fare zone: 214 and 915 (Tarifverbund Ostwind)

Passengers
- 2018: 5,800 per weekday

Services
Preceding station	SBB CFF FFS	Following station
Wil towards Geneva Airport	IC 1	Flawil towards St. Gallen
Wil towards Zürich HB	IR 13	Flawil towards Sargans
Preceding station	St. Gallen S-Bahn	Following station
Wil Terminus	S1	Flawil towards Schaffhausen
Wil towards Winterthur	SN21 Limited service	Flawil towards St. Gallen
Wil towards Winterthur	SN22 Limited service	Flawil towards Heerbrugg
Location
- Location within Switzerland Location within Canton of St. Gallen

Uzwil railway station (German: Bahnhof Uzwil) is a railway station in Uzwil, in the Swiss canton of St. Gallen. It is an intermediate station on the St. Gallen–Winterthur line located between Flawil and Wil SG. Until 2013, the next station in direction of Wil was Algetshausen-Henau.

== Services ==
As of the December 2020 timetable change, Uzwil is served by two long-distance SBB services, both of which run hourly and operate over the St. Gallen–Winterthur line, combining for half-hourly service between Zürich and St. Gallen:

- /: half-hourly service between Zürich Hauptbahnhof and St. Gallen and hourly service to Geneva Airport and Chur.
- St. Gallen S-Bahn S1: half-hourly service over the St. Gallen–Winterthur line between Wil and Schaffhausen via St. Gallen, supplementing the long-distance services.

During weekends, the station is served by two nighttime S-Bahn services (SN21, SN22), offered by Ostwind fare network, and operated by Thurbo for St. Gallen S-Bahn.

- St. Gallen S-Bahn:
  - SN21: hourly service to Winterthur and to St. Gallen.
  - SN22: hourly service to Winterthur and to Heerbrugg (via St. Gallen).

== See also ==
- Rail transport in Switzerland
