= Algetshausen-Henau railway station =

Disused railway station in Switzerland

Algetshausen-Henau

General information
- Other names: Bahnhof Algetshausen-Henau
- Location: Bahnhof, Algetshausen; Switzerland
- Coordinates: 47°26′54.8″N 09°06′35.5″E
- Elevation: 555.4 m (1,822 ft)
- Operator: Swiss Federal Railways
- Line: St. Gallen–Winterthur railway line
- Platforms: 1
- Tracks: 2 (German: Gleis)

Construction
- Structure type: at-grade
- Platform levels: 1
Location
- Location within Switzerland Location within Canton of St. Gallen

Algetshausen-Henau railway station (German: Bahnhof Algetshausen-Henau) was a railway station in Algetshausen in the municipality of Uzwil in the canton of St. Gallen, Switzerland. It was located on the St. Gallen–Winterthur railway line, between Schwarzenbach and Uzwil. The station, which opened in 1927, was closed in 2013 with the introduction of the St. Gallen S-Bahn.

== See also ==
- Ghost station
