= Jonschwil =

- Municipality
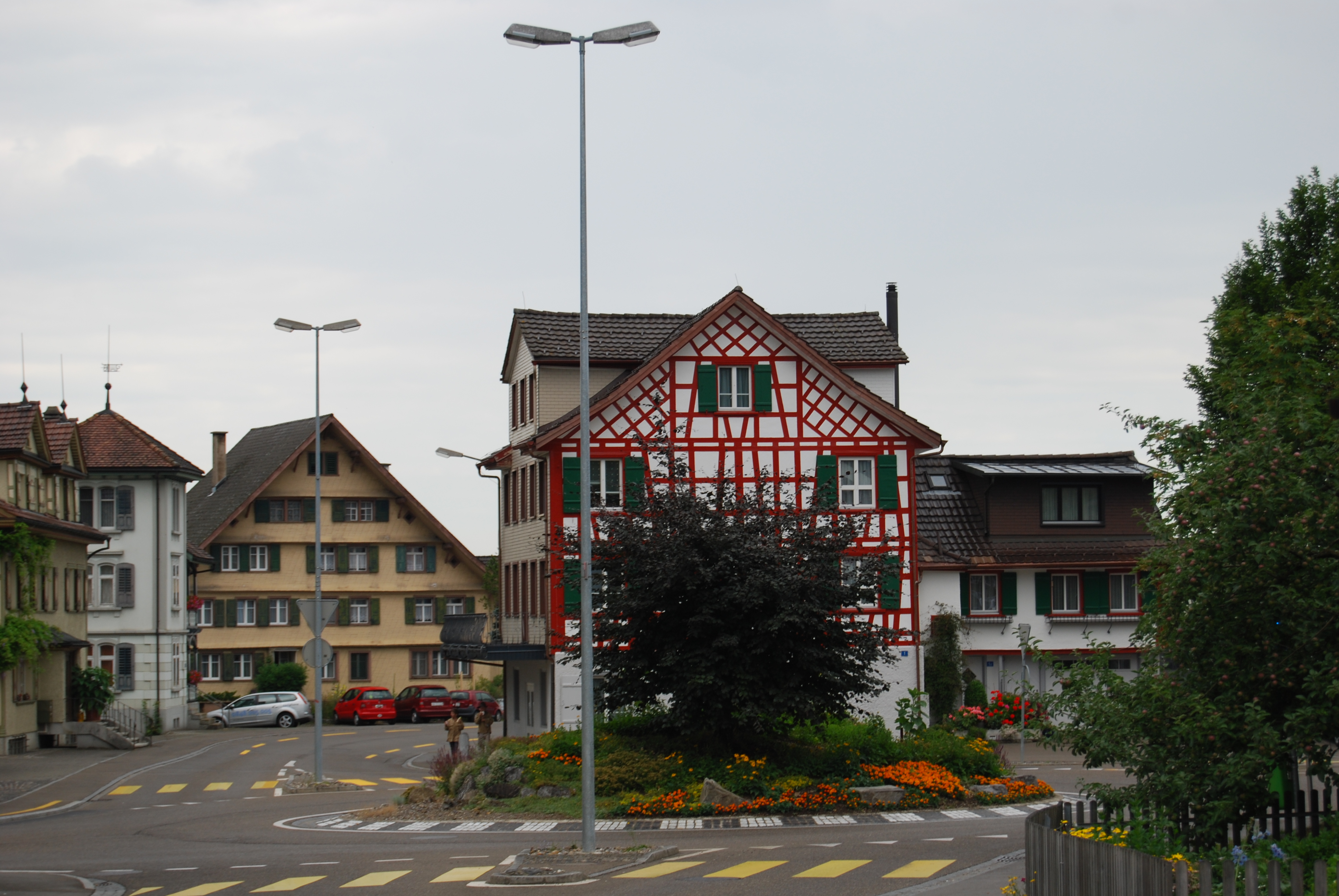

- Coat of arms
- Location of Jonschwil
- Location within Switzerland Location within Canton of St. Gallen
- Coordinates: 47°26′N 9°5′E
- Country: Switzerland
- Canton: St. Gallen
- District: Wil

Government
  - Mayor: Stefan Frei

Area
  - Total: 10.99 km^{2} (4.24 sq mi)
- Elevation: 600 m (2,000 ft)

Population (December 2020)
  - Total: 3,873
  - Density: 352.4/km^{2} (912.7/sq mi)
- Time zone: UTC+01:00 (CET)
  - Summer (DST): UTC+02:00 (CEST)
- Postal code: 9243
- SFOS number: 3405
- ISO 3166 code: CH-SG
- Localities: Schwarzenbach
- Surrounded by: Kirchberg, Lütisburg, Oberuzwil, Rickenbach (TG), Uzwil, Wil
- Website: www.jonschwil.ch

Jonschwil is a municipality in the Wahlkreis (constituency) of Wil in the canton of St. Gallen in Switzerland.

== History ==
Jonschwil was first mentioned in 796 as Johannisvilare. In 1282 it was mentioned as Jonswiler. The village of Schwarzenbach was first mentioned in 779, and the hamlet of Bettenau was mentioned in 772 as Betinauvia.

== Geography ==
Jonschwil has an area, as of 2006, of 11.1 km^{2} (4.3 sq mi). Of this area, 58.6% is used for agricultural purposes, while 24.5% is forested. Of the rest of the land, 15% is settled (buildings or roads) and the remainder (1.9%) is non-productive (rivers or lakes).

The municipality is located in the Wil Wahlkreis. It consists of the villages of Jonschwil and Schwarzenbach and the hamlets of Bettenau and Oberrindal as well as scattered farm houses.

Bettenauer Weiher is a small lake located in Oberuzwil at the border to Jonschwil.

== Coat of arms ==
The blazon of the municipal coat of arms is Or St. Martin armoured Azure holding a sword Argent cutting his cloak Gules riding on a Horse Sable.

== Demographics ==
Jonschwil has a population (as of 31 December 2020) of 3,873. As of 2007, about 9.4% of the population was made up of foreign nationals. Of the foreign population, (as of 2000), 31 are from Germany, 31 are from Italy, 150 are from ex-Yugoslavia, 21 are from Austria, 15 are from Turkey, and 27 are from another country. Over the last 10 years the population has grown at a rate of 11.1%. Most of the population (as of 2000) speaks German (94.9%), with Albanian being second most common ( 1.7%) and Serbo-Croatian being third ( 1.1%). Of the Swiss national languages (as of 2000), 2,974 speak German, 6 people speak French, 24 people speak Italian, and 1 person speaks Romansh.

The age distribution, as of 2000, in Jonschwil is; 462 children or 14.7% of the population are between 0 and 9 years old and 536 teenagers or 17.1% are between 10 and 19. Of the adult population, 369 people or 11.8% of the population are between 20 and 29 years old. 534 people or 17.0% are between 30 and 39, 499 people or 15.9% are between 40 and 49, and 385 people or 12.3% are between 50 and 59. The senior population distribution is 181 people or 5.8% of the population are between 60 and 69 years old, 94 people or 3.0% are between 70 and 79, there are 62 people or 2.0% who are between 80 and 89, and there are 12 people or 0.4% who are between 90 and 99.

In 2000 there were 274 persons (or 8.7% of the population) who were living alone in a private dwelling. There were 533 (or 17.0%) persons who were part of a couple (married or otherwise committed) without children, and 2,007 (or 64.0%) who were part of a couple with children. There were 212 (or 6.8%) people who lived in single parent home, while there are 19 persons who were adult children living with one or both parents, 15 people who lived in a household made up of relatives, 18 who lived household made up of unrelated persons, and 56 who are either institutionalized or live in another type of collective housing.

In the 2007 federal election the most popular party was the SVP which received 40.2% of the vote. The next three most popular parties were the CVP (26.3%), the FDP (10.4%) and the SP (9.8%).

The entire Swiss population is generally well educated. In Jonschwil about 74.1% of the population (between age 25-64) have completed either non-mandatory upper secondary education or additional higher education (either university or a Fachhochschule). Out of the total population in Jonschwil, as of 2000, the highest education level completed by 617 people (19.7% of the population) was Primary, while 1,206 (38.5%) have completed Secondary, 277 (8.8%) have attended a Tertiary school, and 133 (4.2%) are not in school. The remainder did not answer this question.

The historical population is given in the following table:

year	population
1819	867
1850	1,307
1900	1,201
1950	1,383
1970	1,708
2000	3,134

== Economy ==
As of 2007, Jonschwil had an unemployment rate of 1.15%. As of 2005, there were 119 people employed in the primary economic sector and about 48 businesses involved in this sector. 581 people are employed in the secondary sector and there are 51 businesses in this sector. 692 people are employed in the tertiary sector, with 84 businesses in this sector.

As of October 2009 the average unemployment rate was 2.3%. There were 192 businesses in the municipality of which 53 were involved in the secondary sector of the economy while 92 were involved in the third.

As of 2000 there were 496 residents who worked in the municipality, while 1,184 residents worked outside Jonschwil and 646 people commuted into the municipality for work.

== Culture ==
Jonschwil had become a "concert village" in the 2000s with the venue at Degenau. For the first time in 1996, an openair concert was held at the foot of the Wildberg through the anniversary festival "1200 Years of Jonschwil". This was followed in 2003 by the "Talentair" - a mixture of talent competition and open air. This event was under the patronage of "SG2003"; the anniversary year 200 years of St. Gallen.

In 2006, the OpenAir Tufertschwil took place here with groups such as Status Quo, Jamiroquai, Tokio Hotel and DJ Bobo. The second edition took place the following year.

Under the new name SummerDays Festival, another edition took place in Jonschwil. With 16'000 visitors (8000 per festival day), the festival was not sold out. The following bands played: Gary Moore, Jethro Tull, The Hooters, Florian Ast, Bootleg Beatles on Friday and Nena, Polo Hofer & die Schmetterband, Sunrise Avenue, Plüsch, Bagatello, Starch, Frantic and the Tiger Ensemble from St. Pauli on Saturday.

After the festival, the new organisers took stock and decided not to hold a festival in 2008. Since 2009, the event has been held in Arbon, directly on Lake Constance.

In August 2008, the US band Metallica played the only concert of the Summer Vacation Tour on Swiss soil here in front of more than 35,000 spectators. Supporting acts were Mnemic from Denmark and Within Temptation from the Netherlands. A curious consequence of this concert was that Nothing else matters from 1992 again rose to number 10 in the Swiss singles charts. The concert was followed by a performance by the band Toten Hosen.

After a performance by the Toten Hosen in 2009, the Sonisphere Festival took place in 2010 with 45,000 visitors. With Metallica, Megadeth, Slayer and Anthrax, four bands that have shaped the style of thrash metal were on stage. No more open-air festivals were held in the next years after heavy rainfall led to chaotic conditions during the festival.

On the weekend of 9/10 August 2014, the Sonnentanz festival took place in Jonschwil. Some acts had to be uninvited at short notice for financial reasons. The festival ended with a deficit for the organiser. Following a decision of principle by the municipality of Jonschwil, it has since refrained from holding large events on the municipality's Degenau grounds. The reason given was the condition of the ground and the noise.

== Religion ==
From the 2000 census, 1,942 or 62.0% are Roman Catholic, while 758 or 24.2% belonged to the Swiss Reformed Church. Of the remaining population, there are 31 individuals (or about 0.99% of the population) who belong to the Orthodox Church, and there are 40 individuals (or about 1.28% of the population) who belong to another Christian church. There are 112 (or about 3.57% of the population) who are Islamic. There are 7 individuals (or about 0.22% of the population) who belong to another church (not listed on the census), 145 (or about 4.63% of the population) belong to no church, are agnostic or atheist, and 99 individuals (or about 3.16% of the population) did not answer the question.

== Transportation ==
The municipality is served by bus routes of PostBus Switzerland and RegioBus. There used to be a railway station in Schwarzenbach on the St. Gallen–Winterthur railway line but which closed in December 2013.
