= Georg Wilhelm Rinck von Baldenstein =

Official of the Prince-Abbey of St. Gallen (1643–1714)

- Born: 10 August 1643; Wartegg Castle, Rorschacherberg, Old Swiss Confederacy
- Died: 14 March 1714 (aged 70); Rorschach, Old Swiss Confederacy
- Occupation: Court official
- Spouse: Maria Elisabeth von Bernhausen
- Children: Joseph Wilhelm Rinck von Baldenstein

Georg Wilhelm Rinck von Baldenstein (10 August 1643 – 14 March 1714) was an official in the service of the Prince-Abbey of St. Gallen, where he served as court chancellor, bailiff of the Toggenburg, and finally Landshofmeister.

== Biography ==
Rinck von Baldenstein was born on 10 August 1643 at Wartegg Castle in the municipality of Rorschacherberg, the son of Ignaz Balthasar Rinck von Baldenstein and brother of Franz Christoph Rinck von Baldenstein. In 1671 he married Maria Elisabeth von Bernhausen, daughter of Wolfgang Jakob von Bernhausen, bailiff at Blatten. He studied philosophy at Freiburg im Breisgau.

From 1671 to 1675 Rinck von Baldenstein was bailiff at Blatten in the service of the Prince-Abbey of St. Gallen, from 1675 to 1685 court chancellor, from 1685 to 1693 bailiff of the Toggenburg, and from 1693 to 1712 Landshofmeister. As the prince-abbot's representative, he took part in the peace negotiations following the Toggenburg unrest, at Baden in 1712 and at Rorschach in 1713–1714.

== Bibliography ==
- P. Staerkle, Verzeichnis der weltlichen Beamten des Stifts St. Gallen vom 13. bis 18. Jahrhundert, manuscript, n.d. (Stiftsarchiv St. Gallen)
- A. Kobler, Stammbaum der Rinck von Baldenstein, manuscript, n.d. (Kantonsbibliothek St. Gallen)
- P. Braun, Joseph Wilhelm Rinck von Baldenstein (1704–1762), 1981, 29–30
