= Schwarzenbach railway station =

Disused railway station in Switzerland

Schwarzenbach SG
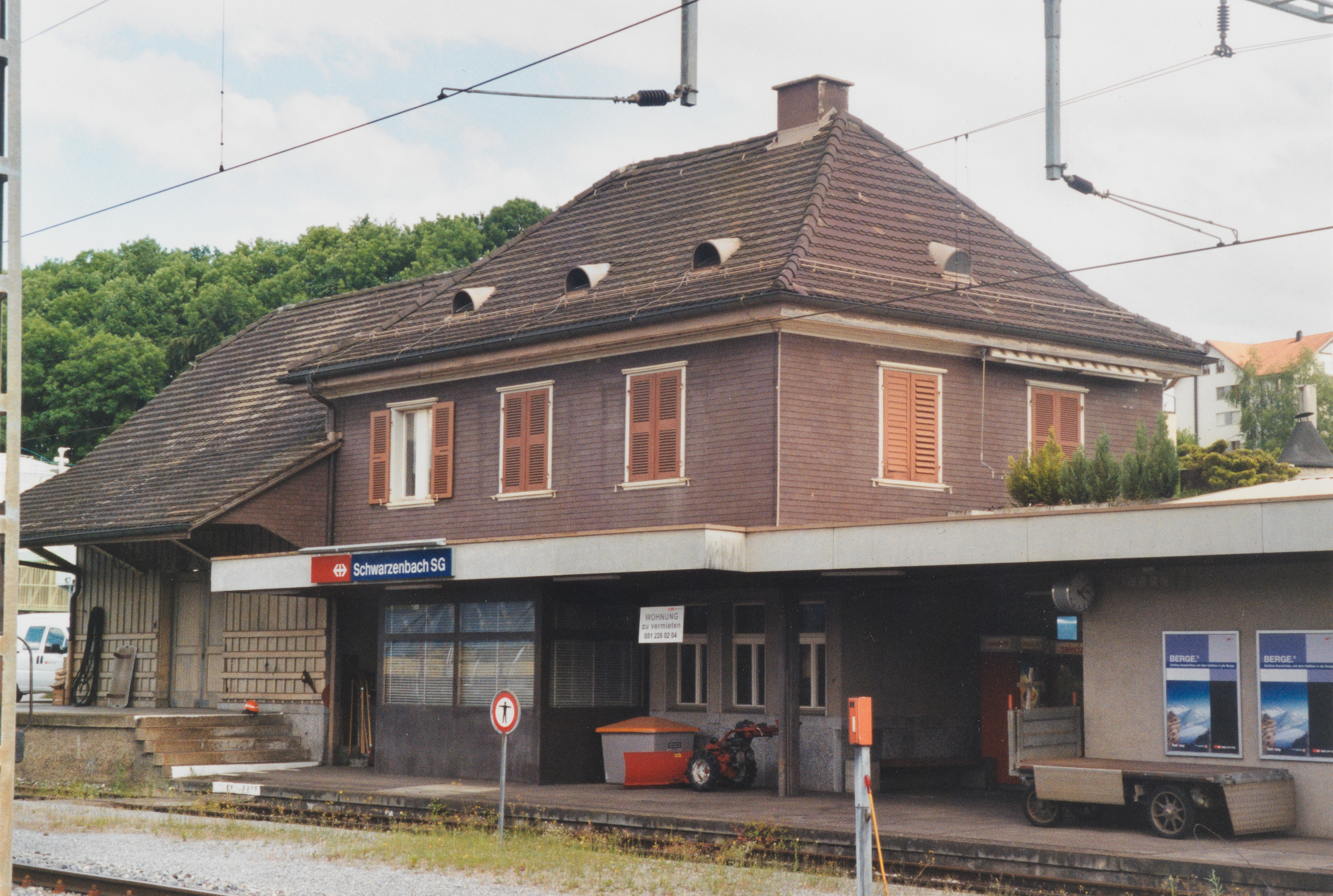
- The station building in 2002

General information
- Other names: Bahnhof Schwarzenbach
- Location: Bahnhofstrasse 9, Schwarzenbach; Switzerland
- Coordinates: 47°26′42.6″N 09°04′06.9″E
- Elevation: 540.1 m (1,772 ft)
- Operator: Swiss Federal Railways
- Line: St. Gallen–Winterthur railway line
- Platforms: 1
- Tracks: 3 (German: Gleis)

Construction
- Structure type: at-grade
- Platform levels: 1
Location
- Location within Switzerland Location within Canton of St. Gallen

Schwarzenbach SG railway station (German: Bahnhof Schwarzenbach) was a railway station in Schwarzenbach in the municipality of Jonschwil in the canton of St. Gallen (SG), Switzerland. It was located on the St. Gallen–Winterthur railway line, between Wil and Algetshausen-Henau. The station was closed in 2013 with the introduction of the St. Gallen S-Bahn. The station building opened in 1927.

== See also ==
- Ghost station
