= Rebstein-Marbach railway station =

Railway station in Switzerland

Rebstein-Marbach
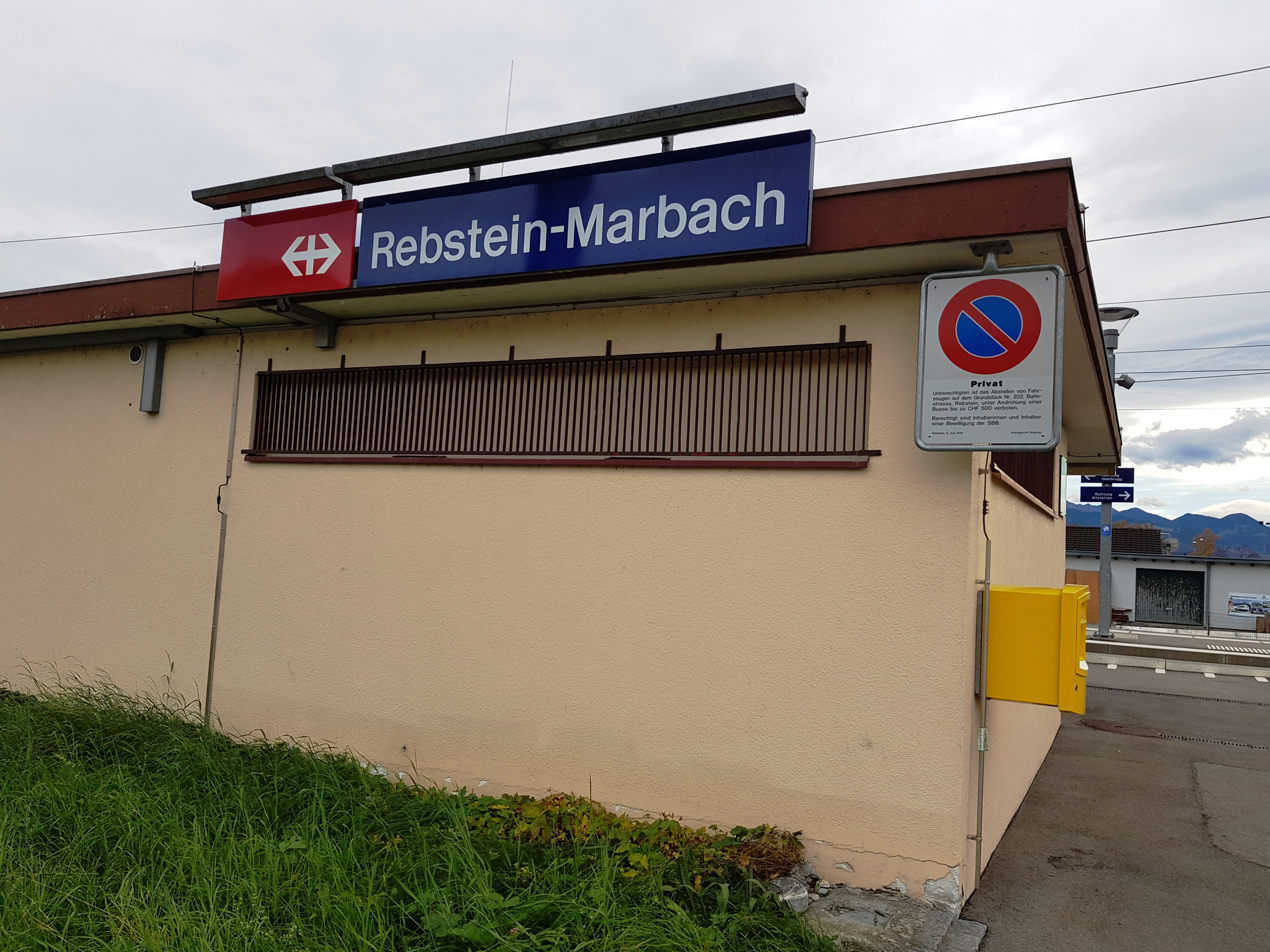
- The station building in 2018

General information
- Location: Rebstein; Switzerland
- Coordinates: 47°23′N 9°35′E
- Owner: Swiss Federal Railways
- Line: Chur–Rorschach line
- Train operators: THURBO; Südostbahn

Services
Preceding station	St. Gallen S-Bahn	Following station
Heerbrugg towards Nesslau-Neu St. Johann	S2	Altstätten SG Terminus
Heerbrugg towards Rapperswil	S4	Altstätten SG towards Sargans
Location
- Location within Switzerland Location within Canton of St. Gallen

Rebstein-Marbach railway station (German: Bahnhof Rebstein-Marbach) is a railway station in Rebstein, in the Swiss canton of St. Gallen. It is an intermediate stop on the Chur–Rorschach line.

== Services ==
As of the December 2023 timetable change, the following services stop at Rebstein-Marbach:

- St. Gallen S-Bahn S2 / S4: half-hourly service between Wattwil and Altstätten SG via St. Gallen and hourly service to Rapperswil, Sargans, and Nesslau-Neu St. Johann.
