= InterCity (Switzerland) =

Type of long-distance passenger trains in Switzerland

The InterCity, abbreviated IC, is a category of mainline train services in Switzerland operated by Swiss Federal Railways, connecting the country's major cities, the range of services (in Switzerland) of which is located between InterRegio (IR) (inter-regional) and EuroCity (EC).

Swiss InterCity lines have been numbered by analogy with the Swiss motorway network since the timetable change of December 2018. Some former InterCity trains were named.

These trains are generally equipped with air-conditioned equipment, a restaurant or a bistro, a mini-bar service, a quiet area and a business area in 1st class as well as a family area or, occasionally, a family car in 2nd class.

Representative logo of the InterCity Service in Switzerland

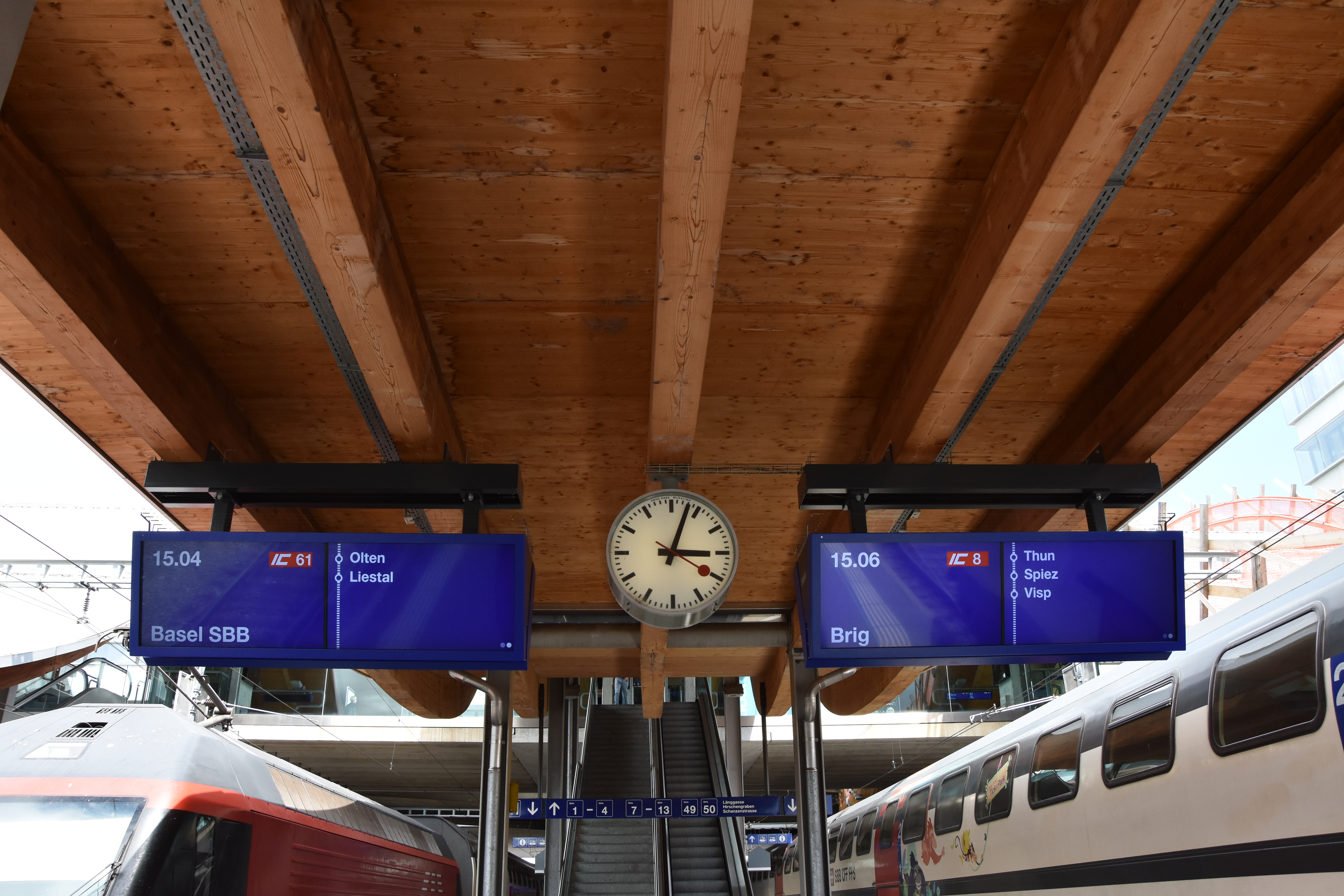
Departures board for IC 61 and IC 8 in Bern

== Cyclic schedule ==
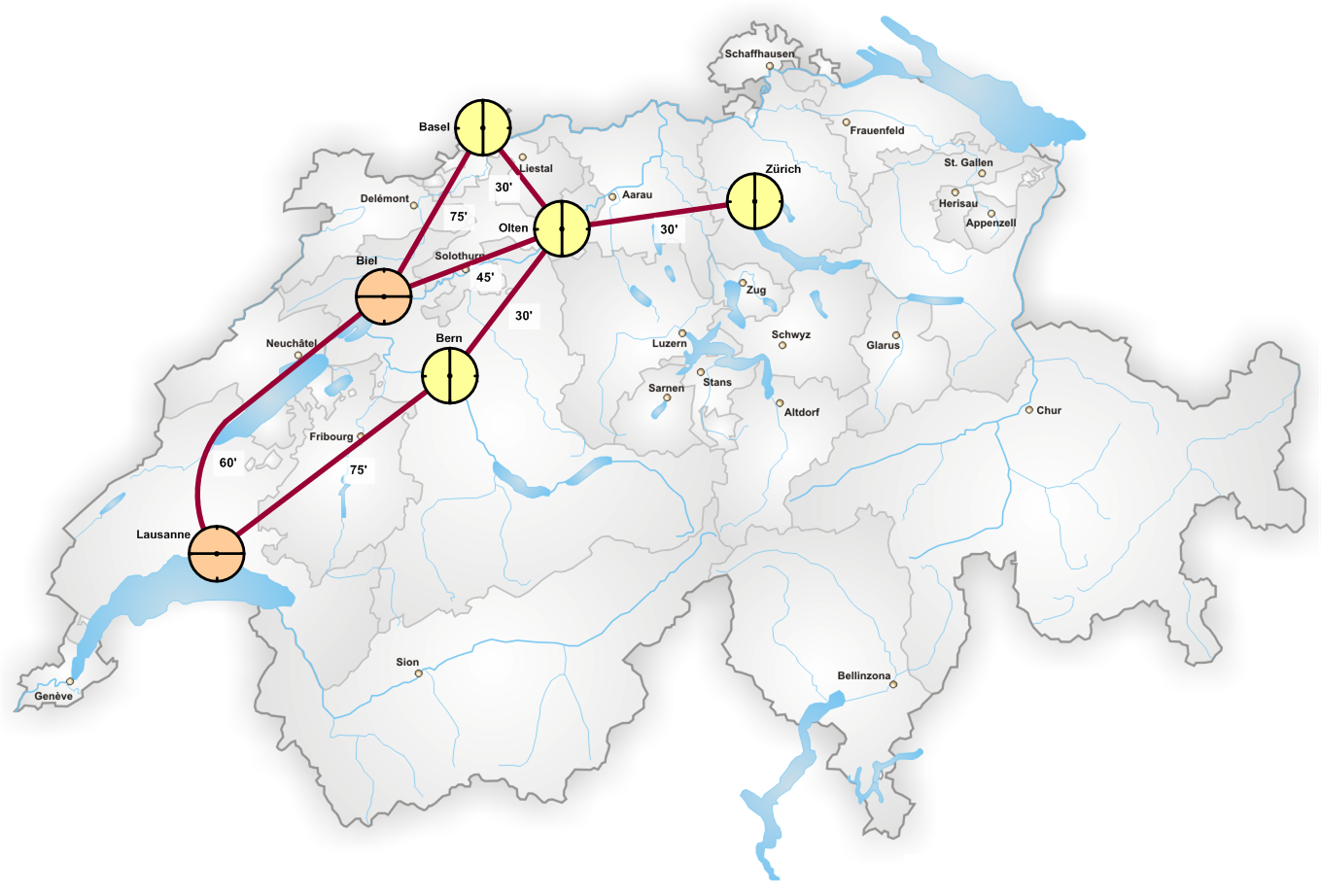
Rail 2000 nodes

The operation of the Swiss InterCity train network is based on the concept of the cadenced timetable. Appeared during the schedule change of December 12, 1982, it ensures that each line is served at least every hour with the same service at the same minutes. When trains cross at the right minutes in stations, this ensures efficient and systematic connections between the different lines every hour. These stations are called nodal points.

So that the main lines can systematically cross each other in the various nodal points, the travel time between them must be (taking into account the stopping time at the station) a multiple of half of the chosen timing frequency. When the Rail 2000 plan was put in place, the Swiss railways had to improve travel speeds between the nodes of Lausanne and Bern, Biel and Zurich or even Zurich and St. Gallen to obtain multiple travel times of 30 minutes.

== Network ==
The InterCity network as of 2019

SBB introduced individual numbering for InterCity routes with the December 2017 timetable change, with the numbers (in general) corresponding to the routes of Switzerland's motorways. As of the December 2022 timetable change, there are eleven InterCity routes in Switzerland, ten of which carry numbers. Most run on an hourly schedule:

- : Geneva Airport–Bern–Zürich HB–St. Gallen
- : Zürich HB–Zug–Lugano
- : Basel SBB–Zürich HB–Chur
- : Lausanne–Biel/Bienne–Zürich HB–St. Gallen (–Rorschach)
- : Basel SBB–Bern–Brig
- : Brig-Bern–Zürich HB–Romanshorn
- : Basel SBB–Lucerne–Lugano
- : Basel SBB–Biel/Bienne
- : Basel SBB–Bern–Interlaken Ost
- : Interlaken Ost–Bern–Zürich HB–Romanshorn
- : Zürich HB–Schaffhausen–Singen (Hohentwiel) (–Stuttgart) (continues as IC 87 in Germany)

== History ==
=== Global history ===
Initially, the main difference between InterCity and conventional express trains was the presence of air-conditioned passenger coaches. Only first-class cars could be used in 1982 (at least one car per InterCity train) as VU IV cars were still being delivered. In addition, with the exception of Swiss Express trains consisting of VU III coaches, there were hardly any other air-conditioned coaches circulating in Switzerland. SBB's only other large series of air-conditioned coaches, the Eurofima, were already in use in international traffic due to the quality criteria required for EuroCity trains. With the continued delivery of VU IV coaches, the proportion of air-conditioned coaches in InterCity train arrangements has steadily increased over the years. Since 2005, the cars have all been air-conditioned with some exceptions; the same goes for InterRegio trains.

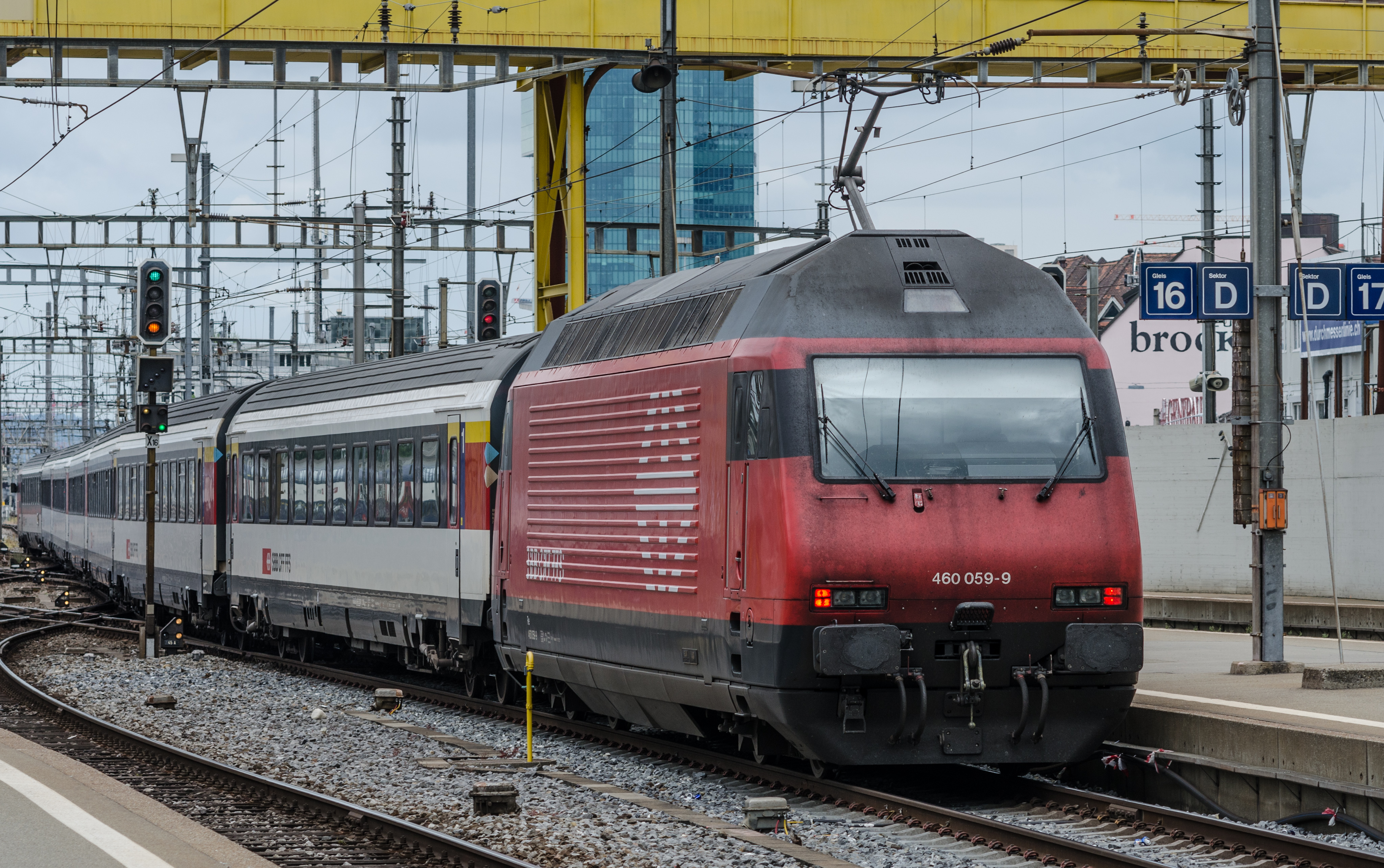
Re 460, one of the principal locomotives used on InterCity lines in Switzerland

As part of the Rail 2000 project, a new line capable of 200 km/h (120 mph) was built and put into service at the end of 2004 in order to reduce the journey time between the stations of Bern and Olten to less than half an hour and between Bern and Zurich to less than an hour, as well as increasing traffic density on this structuring axis of the Swiss rail network. The Rail 2000 project was also marked by the entry into service of the compositions of IC 2000 double-deck passenger coaches towed by Re 460 electric locomotives capable of 200 km/h.

The InterCity network was also strongly marked by the construction of new railway lines across the Alps. The opening of the Lötschberg base tunnel at the end of 2007 to passenger traffic reduced the journey time between Spiez and Brig from approximately one hour to 35 minutes while inserting one more train every two hours and creating a node connection at Visp station with trains running on the Simplon line. The commissioning of the Gotthard base tunnel for mainline traffic during the timetable change of 11 December 2016 has reduced the journey time of InterCity trains running from Basel and Zurich to the canton of Ticino. Passenger traffic increased by 30% according to the SBB between the timetable change in 2016 and April compared to the same period in 2015. Finally, the Ceneri Base Tunnel was put into service for the InterCity traffic during the timetable change on December 13, 2020, allowing an additional time saving of 20 minutes between Bellinzona and Lugano in the crossing of Ticino.

In addition to air-conditioned cars, from the 2017 timetable, a catering service is also part of the compulsory service provided by a Swiss InterCity train. It is a dining car and/or a mini-bar that circulates on the train. They also include a family car with a family zone or second class playground, usually in the pilot car.

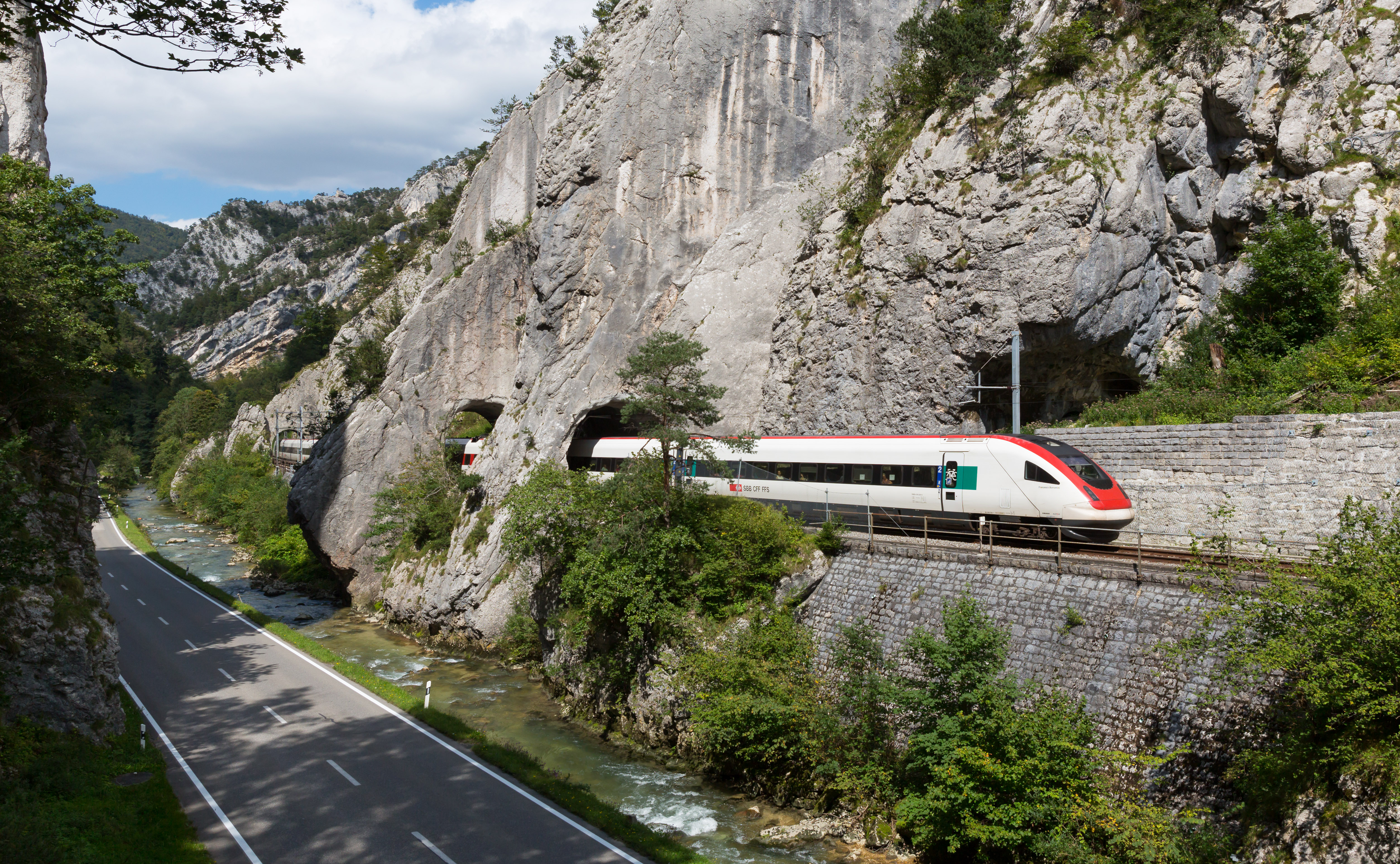
ICN (IC51), exiting the Moutier Gorge tunnel

Since the SBB timetable change in 2017, the InterCity tilting train category (InterCityNeigezug) has been abolished and included in the InterCity train category. In addition, InterCity trains as well as InterRegio have been given line numbers. The numbering is based on that of the national road network (InterCity 1 on the east–west axis of the A1 motorway, InterCity 2 similar to the A2 motorway, etc.).

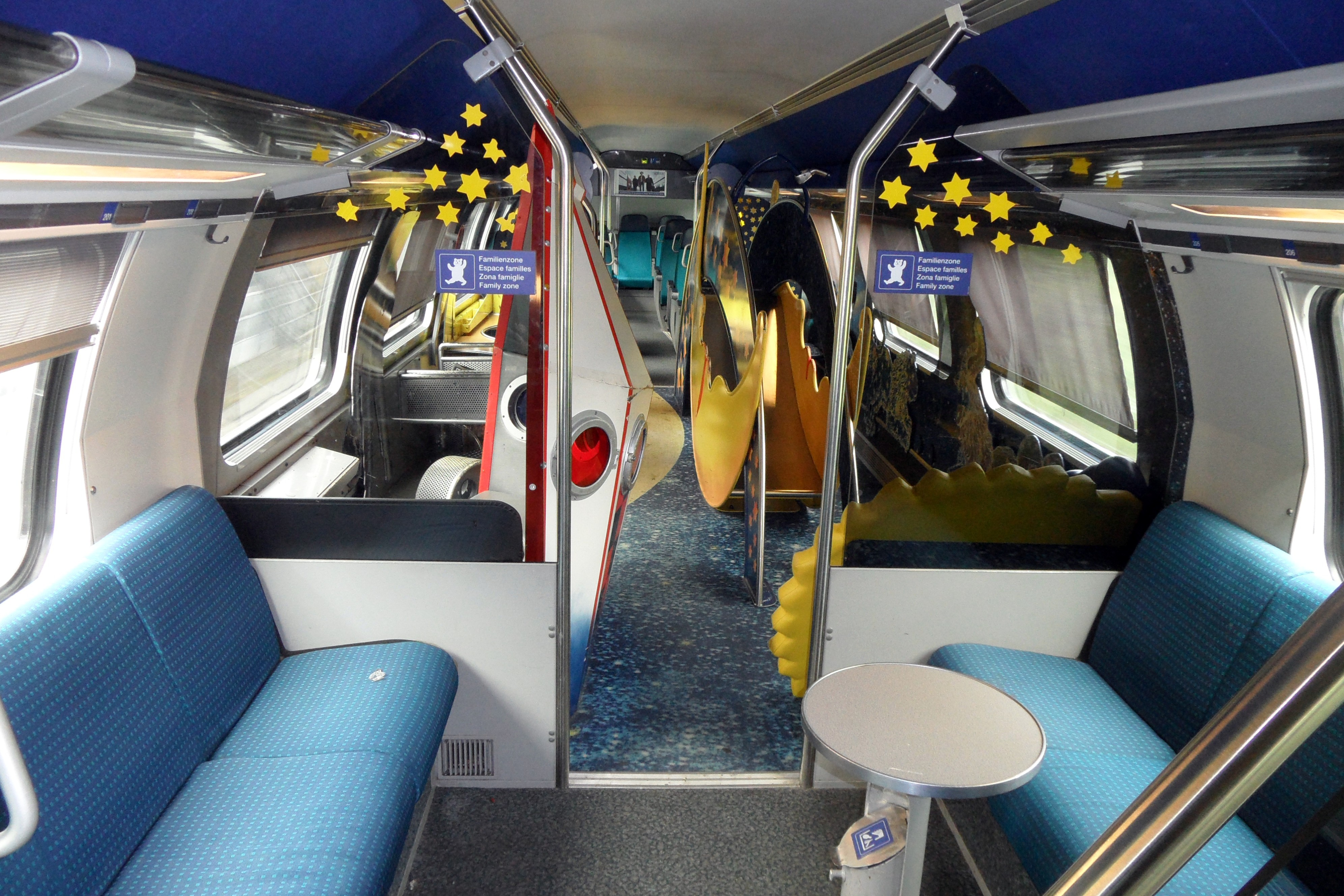
Inside of the IC2000 playground-car

In 2018, SBB launched a renovation program for their 341 IC 2000 double-decker coaches aimed at extending their operation until 2035 or even beyond. This work is carried out by the workshops of Olten and should last from 2019 to 2024. The first two refurbished cars, presented in prototype form, were delivered by SBB in early 2019. These cars feature a new, brighter interior with new carpet and seat coverings. Electrical outlets are also integrated into the tablets while the reception of radiotelephony waves is improved in order to anticipate the use of 5G in trains. The number of spaces for bicycles is also increased from 200 to 360 for the 44 cars that can accommodate bicycles.

During the timetable change in December 2019, the first Bombardier TWINDEXX Swiss Express trains were deployed on the IC 3 line connecting Basel, Zurich and Chur. This deployment continued with the schedule change of December 13, 2020, with the replacement of just over half of the IC 2000 trainsets by these new trains on the IC 1 line which connects Geneva, Lausanne, Bern, Zurich and St-Gall, after already several services on this line from June 2020. These trains should eventually use the tilt to reduce the travel time between Lausanne and Bern. During the same schedule change, the IC 5 trains resumed the non-stop service from Winterthur to St. Gallen on the IC 1, resuming the service with four intermediate stops. This change ensures, with the new EuroCity service between Zurich and Munich central station, using the same paths as the IC 5 from Zurich to St. Gallen, a higher service rate from Zurich to St. Gallen, in particular every rush hours.

This commissioning in successive stages follows the many technical difficulties encountered by Bombardier on these trainsets, in particular on the computer systems but also on the tilting roll compensation device, not to mention the dispute with the associations of disabled people on the subject, accessibility of cars for people with reduced mobility.

The SBB has also launched a renovation program for the 44 RABDe 500 tilting trains, running in particular on IC 5 and IC 51, and scheduled to run from 2021 to 2029 for an estimated amount of 400 million Swiss francs. This work is carried out in the workshops of Yverdon-les-Bains.

=== Evolution of the InterCity network ===
==== 1982 network ====
The Swiss InterCity network of 1982 materialized the introduction of the cadenced timetable in Switzerland and the beginnings of the InterCity network as it is known today. It has five lines served once an hour or once every two hours (some lines could be served at certain times by other types of train such as ICE, EuroCity or TGV but keeping the same schedule as the Swiss InterCity).

- InterCity: Geneva-Airport - Geneva - Lausanne - Fribourg/Freiburg - Bern - Zurich Central Station - Zurich Airport - Winterthur - Wil - Gossau - St. Gallen (present)
- InterCity: Brig - Goppenstein - Kandersteg - Frutigen - Spiez - Thun - Bern - Olten - Basel; every two hours (present)
- InterCity: Basel - Olten - Lucerne - Arth-Goldau (- Bellinzona - Lugano - Chiasso - Milan-Centrale); every two hours (present)
- InterCity: Zurich Main Station - Zug - Arth-Goldau - Bellinzona - Lugano - Chiasso - Milan-Centrale; every two hours (present)
- InterCity: Basel - Zurich Main Station - Ziegelbrücke - Sargans - Landquart - Chur; every hour to Sargans, service every two hours from Ziegelbrücke and Sargans to Chur as well as from Sargans to Buchs and Austria (present)

InterCity Network in June 1982

==== 2002 network ====
The Swiss InterCity network of 2002 constitutes a first major advance since the introduction of the synchronized timetable on the InterCity network in 1982. It has five lines served once an hour or once every two hours (some lines could be served at certain times by other types of train such as ICE, EuroCity or TGV but keeping the same schedule as Swiss InterCity).

- InterCity: Geneva-Airport - Geneva - Lausanne - Fribourg/Freiburg - Bern - Zurich Central Station - Zurich Airport - Winterthur - Wil - Uzwil - Flawil - Gossau - St. Gallen (present)
- InterCity: (Brig - Visp - Goppenstein - Kandersteg - Frutigen -, alternating every two hours with: Interlaken-East - Interlaken-West -) Spiez - Thun - Bern - Zurich Main Station - Zurich Airport - Winterthur - Frauenfeld - Weinfelden - Amriswil - Romanshorn (every hour) Note: The service of this line was significantly modified during the schedule change of December 2007 with the entry into service of the Lötschberg base tunnel, the line only serving Visp station between Brig and Spiez. (present)
- InterCity: (Brig - Visp - Goppenstein - Kandersteg - Frutigen -, alternating every two hours with: Interlaken-East - Interlaken-West -) Spiez - Thun - Bern - Olten - Basel (every hour) Note: The service of this line was significantly modified during the timetable change of December 2007 with the entry into service of the Lötschberg base tunnel, the line only serving Visp station between Brig and Thun. (present)
- InterCity: (Basel- Olten - Lucerne -, alternating with: Zurich Main Station -) Arth-Goldau - Bellinzona - Lugano - Chiasso - Milan-Centrale; every hour (present)
- InterCity: Basel - Zurich Main Station (present IR 36)
- InterCity: Zurich Main Station - Bülach - Schaffhausen (- Singen); to Schaffhausen every hour, then every two hours (present)
- InterCity tilting trains running via Biel and the Jura Foot line, operated since 1999 with the RABDe 500 tilting trains, are part of the special category of ICN until December 2017.

InterCity Network in 2002

== Projects ==
When the timetable change in December 2021, it is planned to extend the IC 5 trains running from Genève-Aéroport to St. Gallen once an hour to Rorschach station. via Lausanne As part of step 2035 of the strategic development program for Swiss rail infrastructure (also known by the Swiss French abbreviation PRODES), it is planned to introduce the semi-hourly rate on Swiss InterRegio and InterCity services in anticipation of train ridership doubling by 2040. The quarter-hour rate in InterCity traffic is also planned for the sections from Geneva to Lausanne as well as from Bern to Zurich and Frauenfeld.

To achieve this objective, many rail network development projects are planned, the most important of which include the achievement of flagship structures:

- The Brütten tunnel, which aims to create a direct non-stop link between Zurich main station and Winterthur in order to save eight minutes in travel time;
- The Zimmerberg II Base Tunnel, saving five minutes in travel time between Zurich main station and Zug;
- The partial or total doubling of the Lötschberg Base Tunnel in order to reach the half-hourly rate on the Lötschberg axis from Bern to Brig;
- The Ligerz Tunnel, removing the last single track section of the Jura Foot Line.

=== STEP 2025 ===
Lines in the planned network plan 2025, according to the network usage plan as of August 2019, whereby it is undefined what ultimately runs as InterRegio, InterCity or EuroCity. Trains that do not run at least every hour are not listed:

==== Romandy and Valais ====
- IR98 (Hourly service) Annemasse – Lausanne (–St-Maurice)
- IC 5 (Half-hourly service) Genève-Aéroport — Lausanne - Biel/Bienne — Rail2000 line — Zurich — Rorschach
- IC 1 (Hourly service) Genève-Aéroport – Bern – Zurich – St. Gallen/Chur
- IC11 (Hourly service Geneva Airport-Bern, Bern-Luzern) (Genève-Aéroport —) Bern — Lucerne
- IR 90 (Half-hourly service) Genève-Aéroport — Brig
- IC 51 (Hourly service)Lausanne – Biel/Bienne – Basel SBB
- RE (Upgraded during rush-hours to IR) (Half-hourly service) Le Locle – Neuchâtel
- IR 66 La Chaux-de-Fonds – Neuchâtel – Bern
- IC31 (Hourly service) Basel SBB - Olten - Bern - Lausanne - Genève-Aéroport
- IC41 (Hourly service) Basel SBB - Olten - Biel/Bienne - Lausanne — Genève-Aéroport
- IC71 (Hourly service) Luzern - Biel/Bienne - Lausanne - Brig
- IC91 (Hourly service) Luzern - Bern - Interlaken Ost

==== Alemannic Switzerland, Grisons and Ticino ====
- IR 65 Biel/Bienne – Bern
- IC (Hourly service) Biel/Bienne – Oensingen – Zurich HB
- IC7 (Half-hourly service) Bern – Rail2000 route – Baden – Zurich
- IR (Hourly service) Bern – Burgdorf – Heitersberg route – Zurich
- IR (Hourly service) Bern – Burgdorf – Olten
- IC 6/IC 61 (Hourly service to both destinations (Interlaken/Brig)) Basel SBB – Bern (–Interlaken Ost/Brig)
- IC (Hourly service) Basel SBB – Bern
- IC 21 (Hourly service to every destination (Locarno/Lugano) Basel SBB – Lucerne (–Locarno/Lugano)
- IC 3 (Half-hourly service) Basel SBB – Heitersberg route – Zurich HB – Chur
- IR 36 (Half-hourly service Basel-Zürich HB, hourly service Zürich HB-Zürich Airport) Basel SBB – Baden – Zurich (–Zurich Airport)
- IR (Hourly service) Lucerne – Zurich HB (–Saint-Gall – Sargans)
- IR48 (Half-hourly service Zürich HB-Schaffahausen, hourly service Schaffhausen-Stuttgart) Zurich HB – Schaffhausen (–Stuttgart)
- IR55 (Hourly service) Zurich HB – Aarau
- IC 2 (Half-hourly service to both destinations (Locarno/Lugano), with four trains per day going to Milan)Zurich HB – Arth Goldau (–Locarno/Lugano (–Milano))
- IC (Hourly service) Zurich HB – Constance
- IC 8/IC81 (Hourly service to both destinations Interlaken/Brig) Romanshorn – Zurich HB – Bern – Interlaken Ost / Brig

=== STEP 2035 ===
==== Romandy and Valais ====
InterCity Network in 2035 (May change)

By 2035, new InterCity lines should see the light of day. In Romandy, IC 51 should be extended to Lausanne - Genève-Aéroport station once an hour and run every half hour from Biel to Basel, while IC 5 will run every 30 minutes from Genève-Aéroport with reversal at Lausanne station. IR 90 connecting Geneva to the canton of Valais will become line IC9 while IR 15 connecting Geneva to Lucerne will be transformed into IC11 and will run in a path offset by half an hour from that of IC 1 between Geneva and Bern. A second train will run in the additional half hour as IC11 between Bern and Lucerne.

==== Alemannic Switzerland, Grisons and Ticino ====
In German-speaking Switzerland, the creation of the IC7 line will create a half-hourly service from Bern to Frauenfeld via Aarau, Zurich Central Station and Winterthur, via the Brütten tunnel. In addition, IC 1 and IC 8 will run alternately every half hour from Bern to Romanshorn and Constance via Zurich International Airport. IC 5 will be extended once an hour from St. Gallen to Sankt Margrethen. IC 6 will run hourly from Brig to Basel and will be completed in the additional half hour by a new IC 61 line connecting Interlaken to Basel with the same service as the IC 6 from Bern to Basel. Likewise, IC 8 will be split by line IC81 running in the additional half hour between Interlaken and Bern. Finally, IC 3 will run every half hour from Basel to Chur via Zurich.

== See also ==
- Rail transport in Switzerland
- Train categories in Europe
