= Heerbrugg railway station =

Railway station in the canton of St. Gallen, Switzerland

Heerbrugg
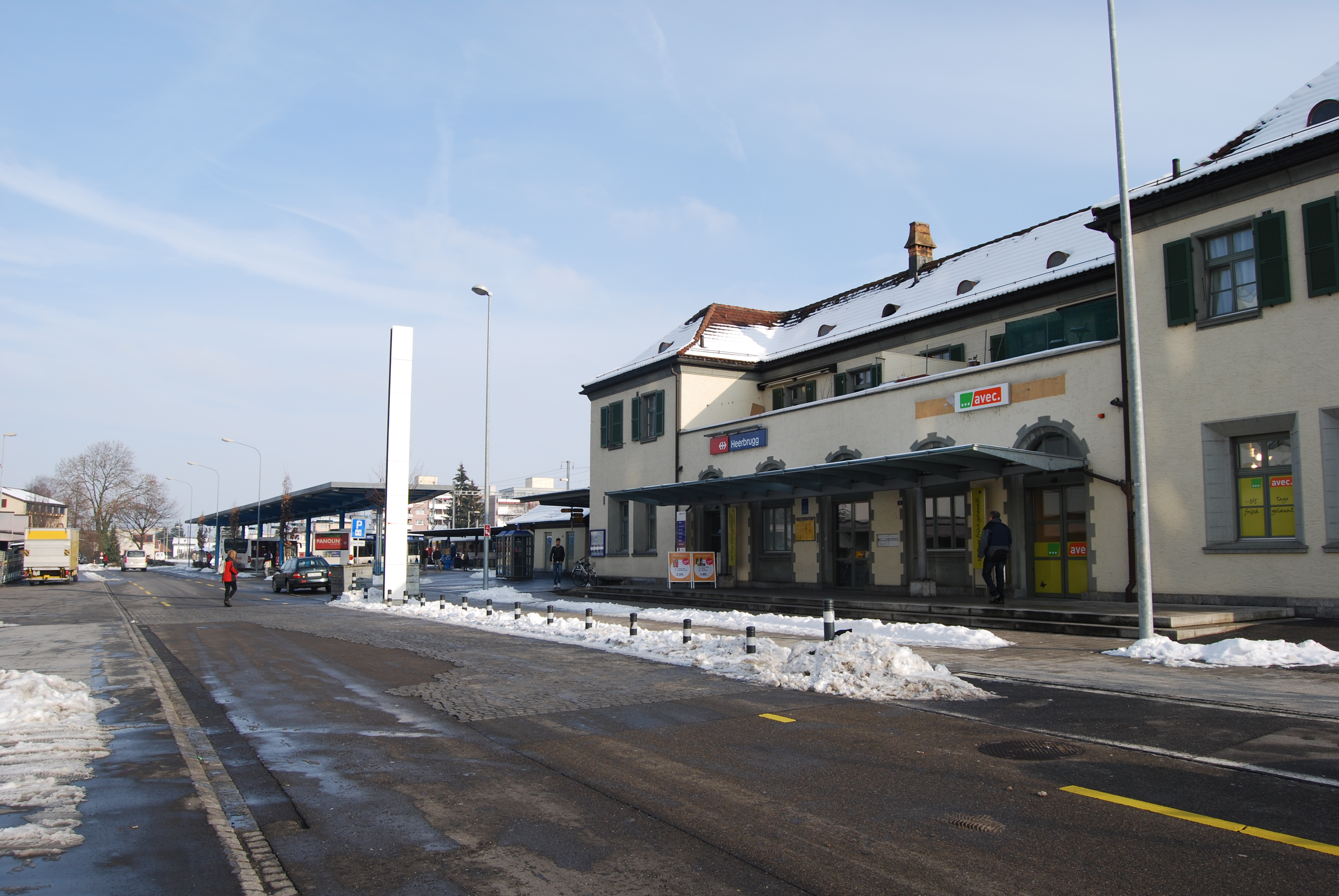
- The station building in 2010

General information
- Location: Au; Switzerland
- Coordinates: 47°25′N 9°38′E
- Elevation: 406 m (1,332 ft)
- Owner: Swiss Federal Railways
- Line: Chur–Rorschach line
- Train operators: Thurbo; Südostbahn; Swiss Federal Railways

Other information
- Fare zone: 235 (Tarifverbund Ostwind)

Services
Preceding station	SBB CFF FFS	Following station
St. Margrethen towards Zürich HB	IR 13	Altstätten SG towards Sargans
Preceding station	Südostbahn	Following station
St. Margrethen towards St. Gallen	IR 13 Alpenrhein-Express	Altstätten SG towards Chur
Preceding station	St. Gallen S-Bahn	Following station
Au SG towards Nesslau-Neu St. Johann	S2	Rebstein-Marbach towards Altstätten SG
Au SG towards Rapperswil	S4	Rebstein-Marbach towards Sargans
Au SG towards Winterthur	SN22 Limited service	Terminus
Location
- Location within Switzerland Location within Canton of St. Gallen

Heerbrugg railway station (German: Bahnhof Heerbrugg) is a railway station in Au, in the Swiss canton of St. Gallen. It is an intermediate stop on the Chur–Rorschach line.

== Services ==
As of the December 2024 timetable change, the following services stop at Heerbrugg:

- : hourly service between Zürich HB and Chur, half-hourly service between St. Gallen and Chur.
- St. Gallen S-Bahn S2 / S4: half-hourly service between Wattwil and Altstätten SG via St. Gallen and hourly service to Rapperswil, Sargans, and Nesslau-Neu St. Johann.

During weekends, the station is served by a nighttime S-Bahn service (SN22), offered by Ostwind fare network, and operated by Thurbo for St. Gallen S-Bahn.

- St. Gallen S-Bahn SN22: hourly service to Winterthur, via St. Gallen.

== Gallery ==
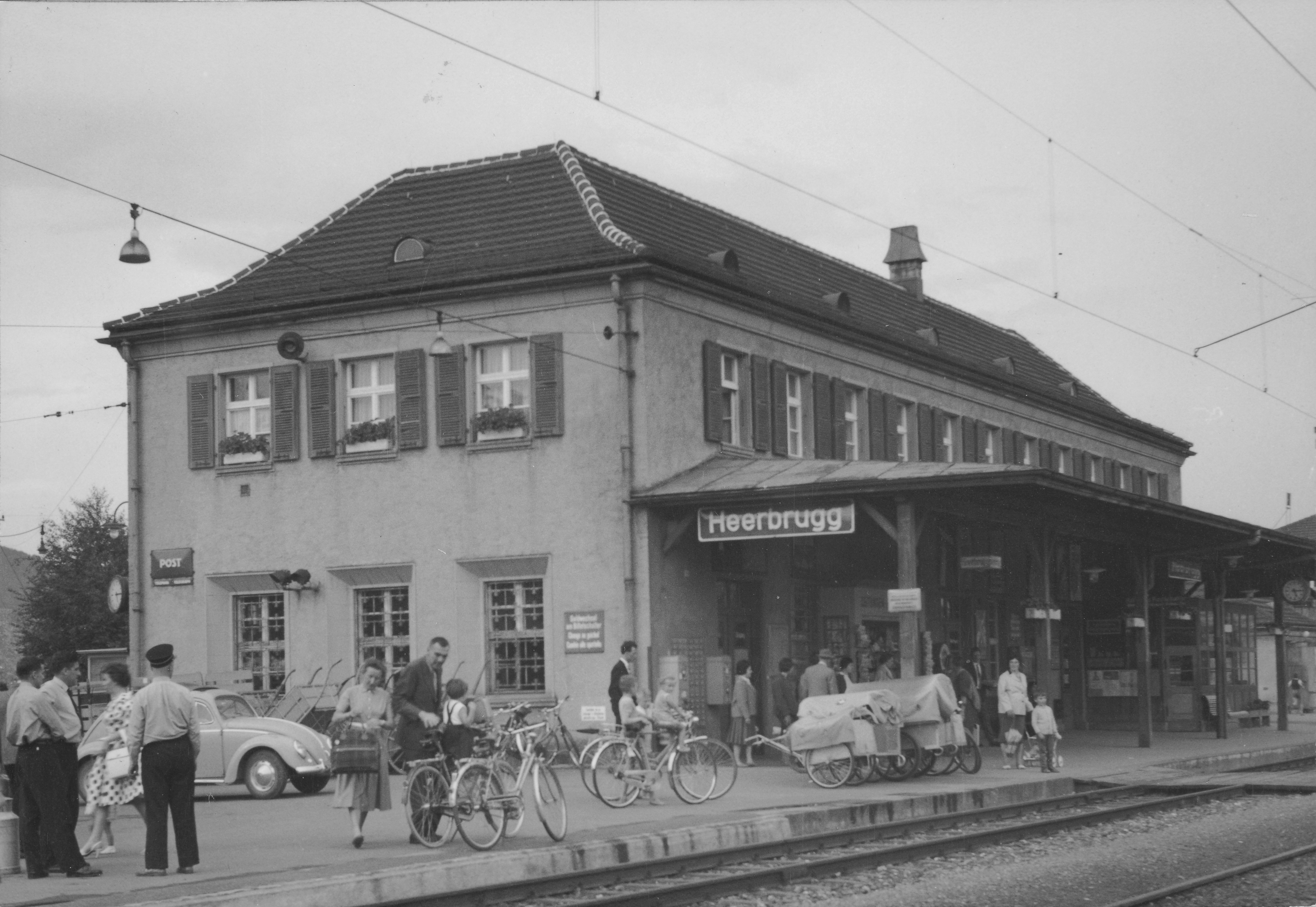
Station building in 1960

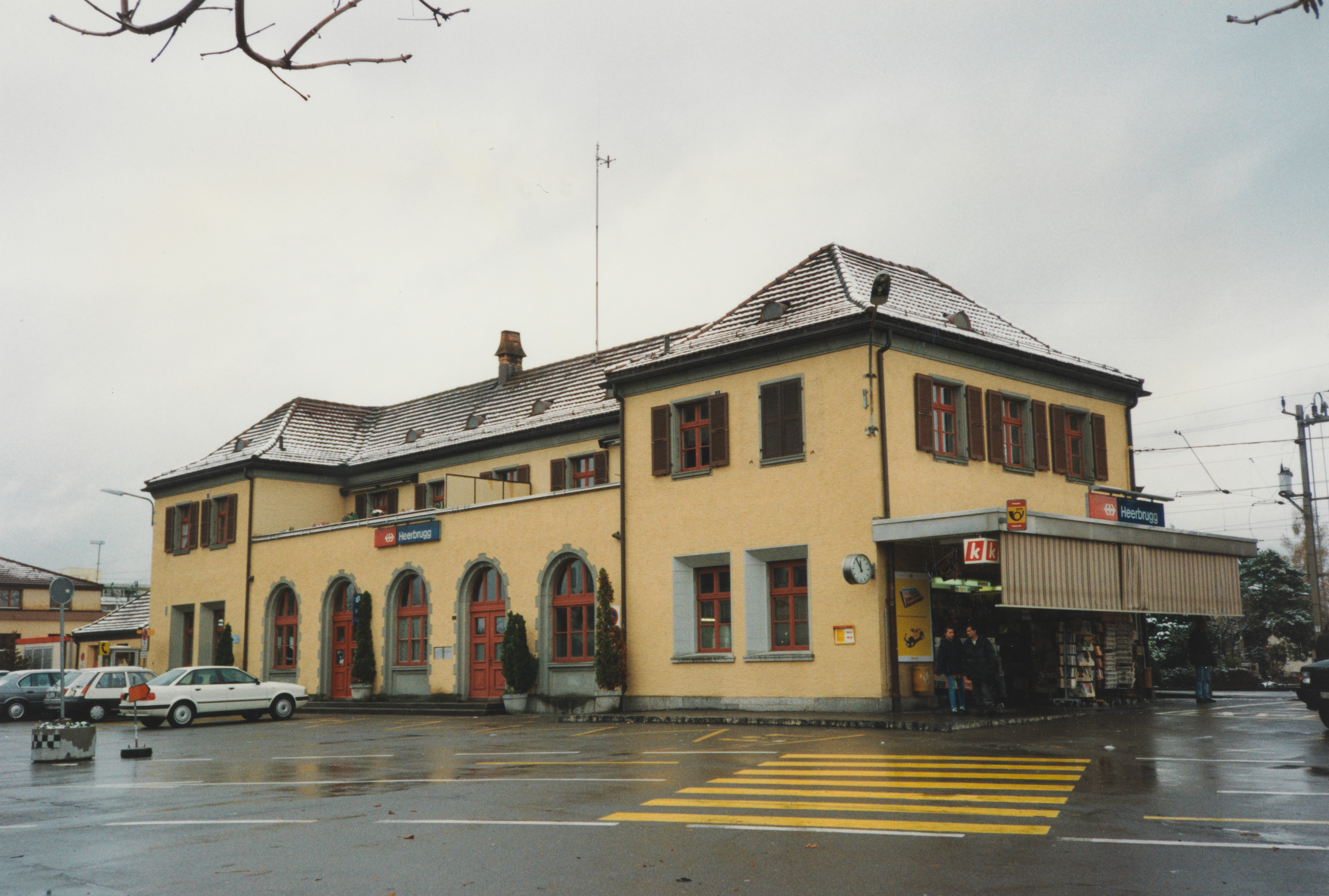
Station building in 1995

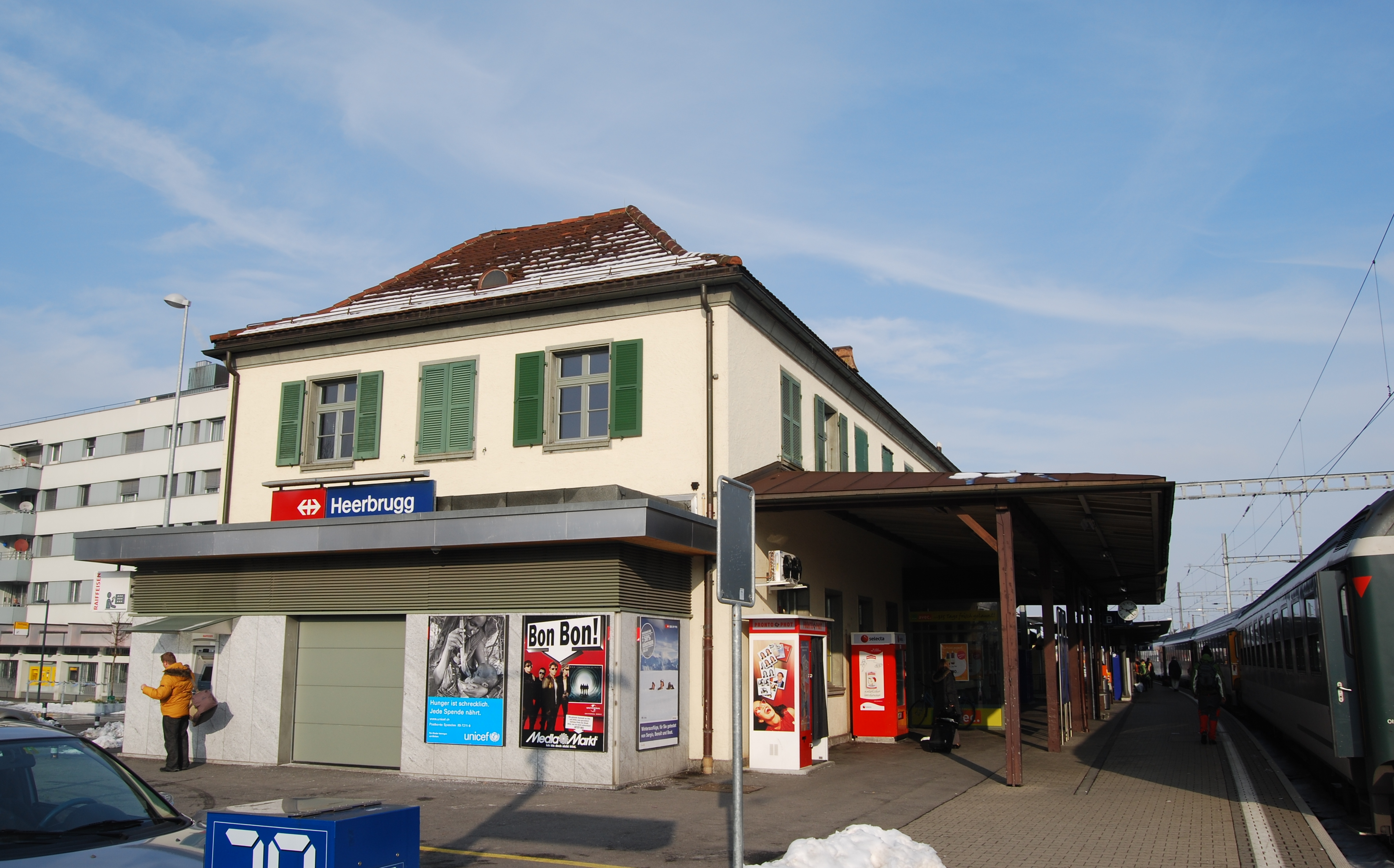
Station building in 2010

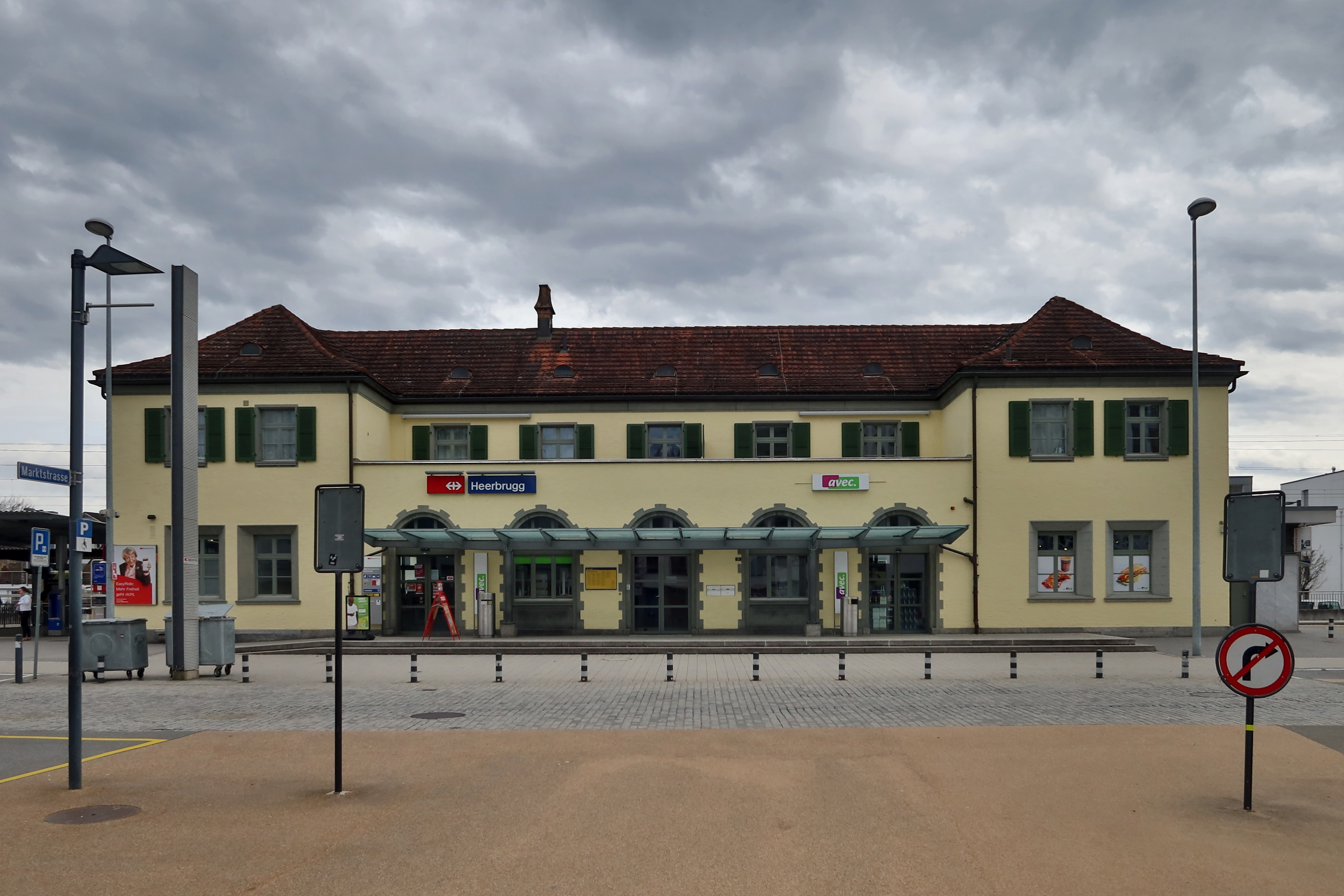
Station building in 2021, streetside

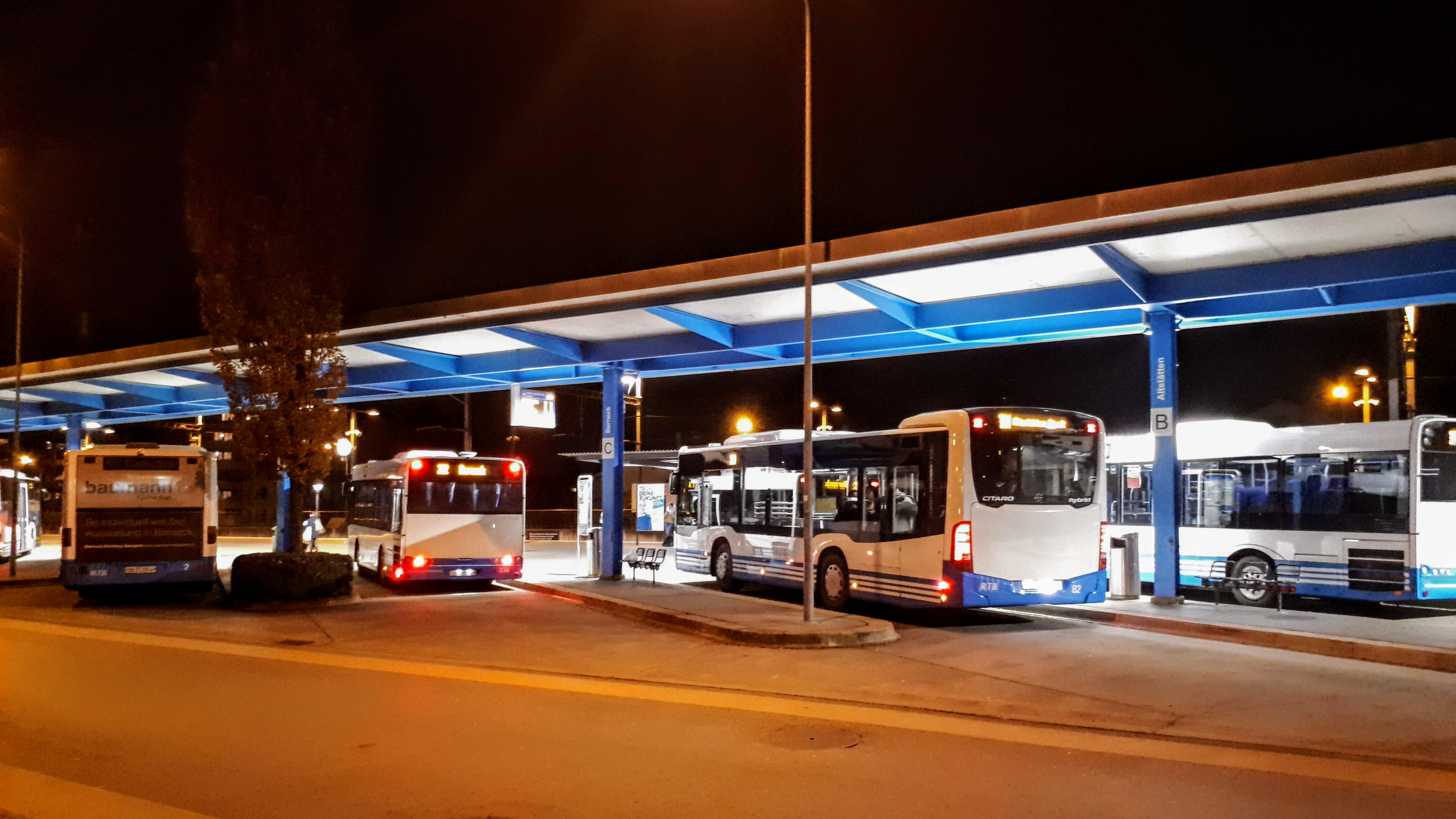
Bus stop in 2019

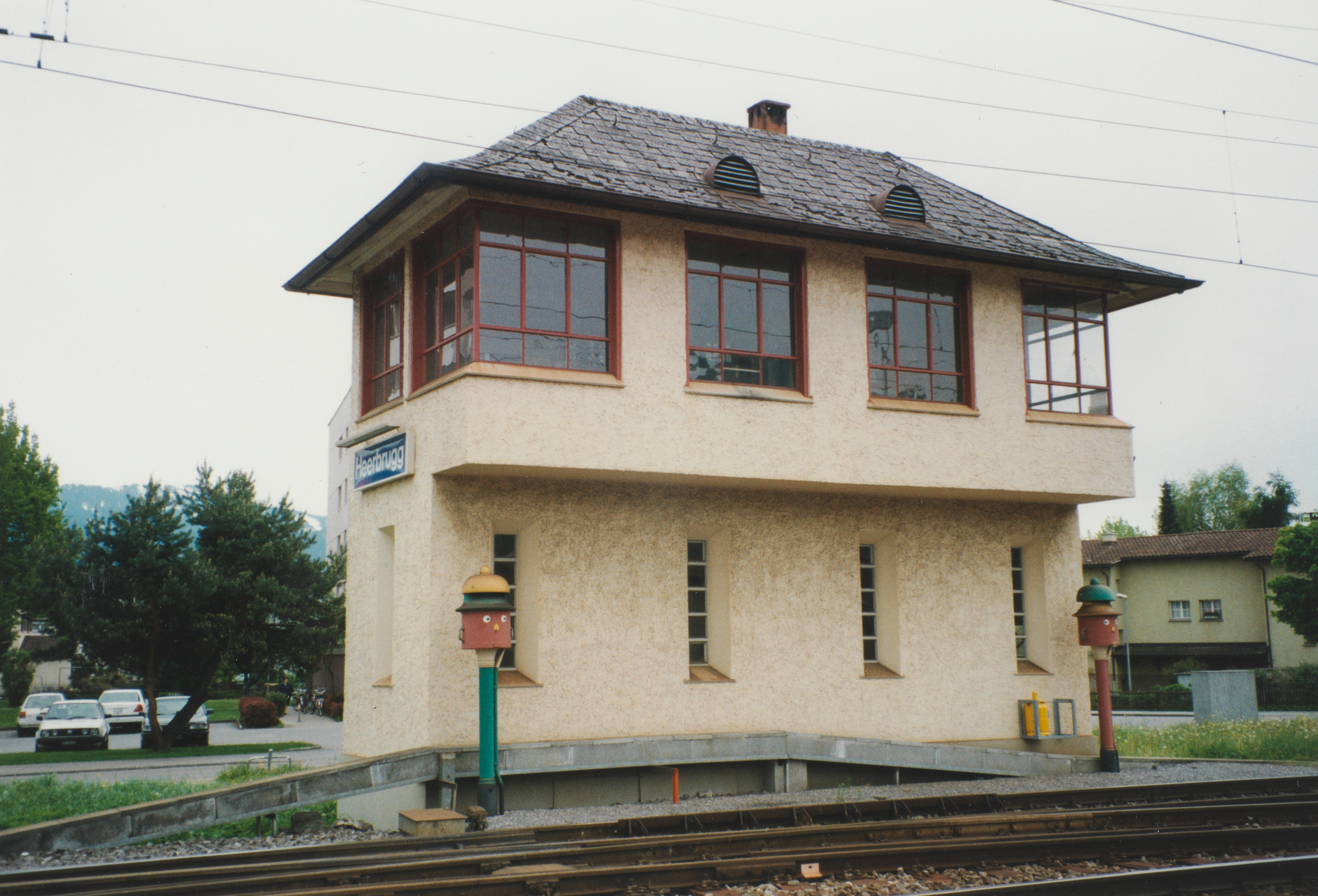
Signal box in 1991

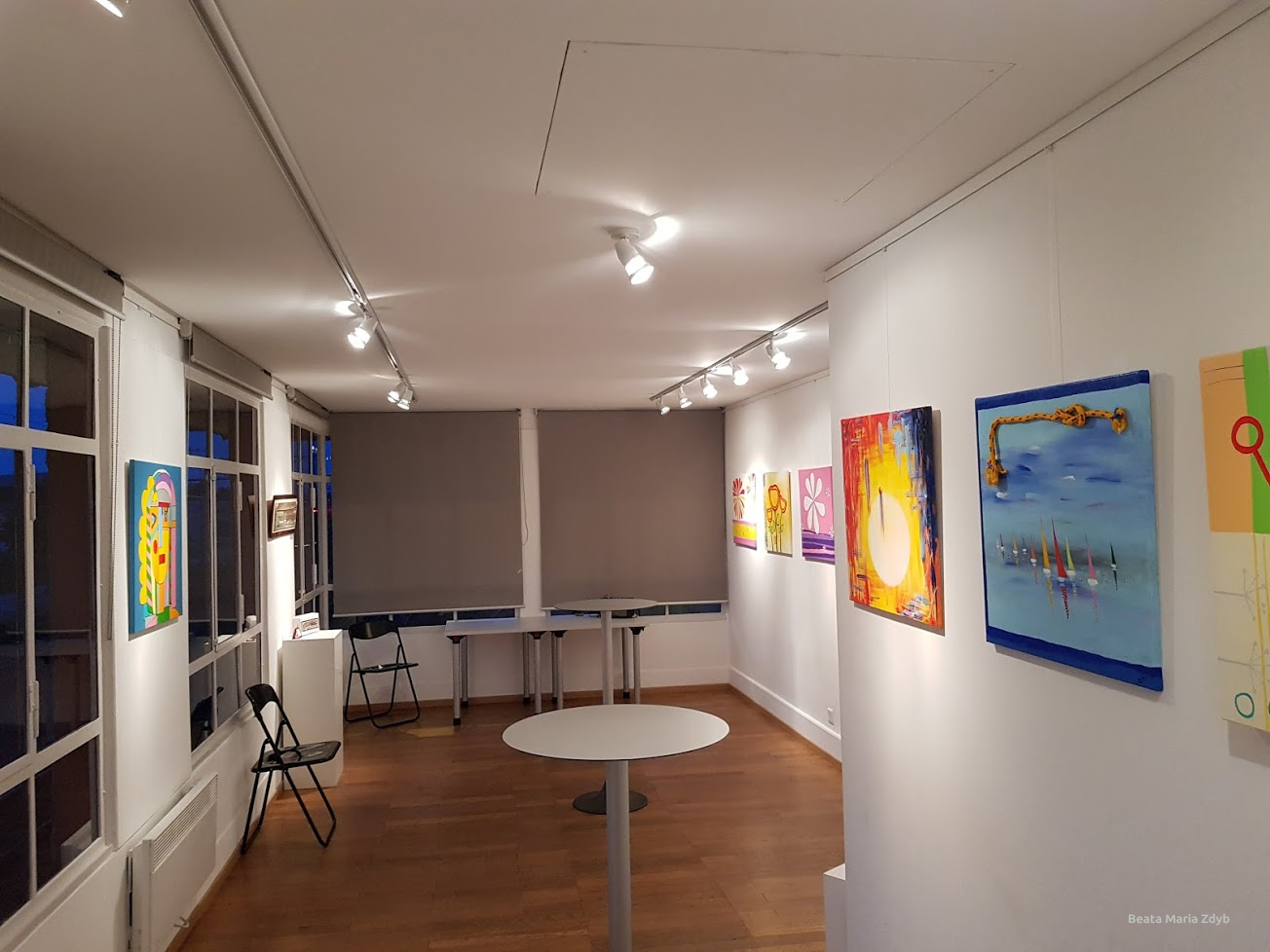
Expo space in the former signal box (2018)

== See also ==
- Bodensee S-Bahn
- Rail transport in Switzerland
