= Altstätten SG railway station =

Railway station in Switzerland

Altstätten SG
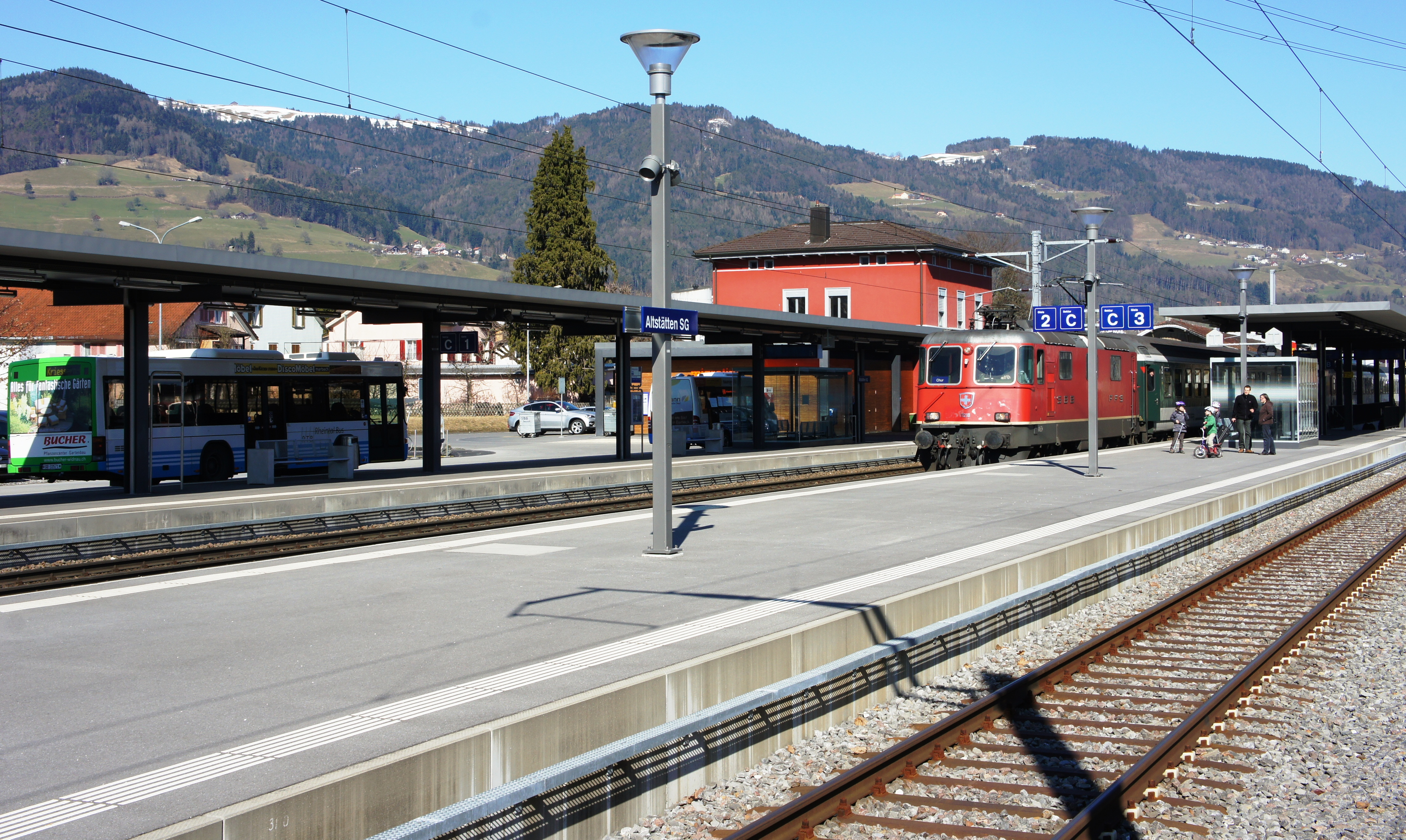
- The station platforms in 2012

General information
- Location: Altstätten; Switzerland
- Coordinates: 47°22′N 9°34′E
- Owner: Swiss Federal Railways
- Line: Chur–Rorschach line
- Train operators: THURBO; Südostbahn; Swiss Federal Railways
- Connections
- Bus: Rheintalbus 300, 301, 331, 332,

Services
Preceding station	SBB CFF FFS	Following station
Heerbrugg towards Zürich HB	IR 13	Buchs SG towards Sargans
Preceding station	Südostbahn	Following station
Heerbrugg towards St. Gallen	IR 13 Alpenrhein-Express	Buchs SG towards Chur
Preceding station	St. Gallen S-Bahn	Following station
Rebstein-Marbach towards Nesslau-Neu St. Johann	S2	Terminus
Rebstein-Marbach towards Rapperswil	S4	Oberriet towards Sargans
Location
- Location within Switzerland Location within Canton of St. Gallen

Altstätten SG railway station (German: Bahnhof Altstätten SG) is one of two railway stations in the municipality of Altstätten in the Swiss canton of St. Gallen (abbreviated to SG). It is an intermediate stop on the Chur–Rorschach line and is served by local and long-distance trains.

== Connections ==
The station is located east of the town center; another station, Altstätten Stadt, is located in the town center and is the eastern terminus of the 1,000 mm (3 ft 3 3/8 in) metre gauge Altstätten–Gais line with additional local services. The stations are approximately 1.6 kilometres (0.99 mi) apart and linked by bus lines 300 and 301 of Rheintalbus.

== Services ==
As of the December 2024 timetable change, the following services stop at Altstätten SG:

- : hourly service between Zürich HB and Chur, half-hourly service between St. Gallen and Chur.
- St. Gallen S-Bahn S2 / S4: half-hourly service to Wattwil via St. Gallen and hourly service to Rapperswil, Sargans, and Nesslau-Neu St. Johann.
