= Sonterswil =

Village in Thurgau, Switzerland

- Former municipality
- Houses on Gunterswilerstrasse and Schulstrasse
- Location of Sonterswil
- Location within Switzerland Location within Canton of Thurgau
- Coordinates: 47.6223°N 9.0794°E
- Country: Switzerland
- Canton: Thurgau
- District: Kreuzlingen
- Municipality: Wäldi

Population (1990)
  - Total: 171
- Time zone: UTC+01:00 (CET)
  - Summer (DST): UTC+02:00 (CEST)
- ISO 3166 code: CH-TG
- Website

Sonterswil is a former Ortsgemeinde (local commune) in the canton of Thurgau, Switzerland, now part of the municipality of Wäldi in the district of Kreuzlingen. From 1803 to 1994 the Ortsgemeinde, made up of Sonterswil and the hamlets of Gunterswilen and (from 1812) Hohrain, was part of the former Munizipalgemeinde (municipal commune) of Wäldi. The village lies on a terrace of the Seerücken between Müllheim and Tägerwilen.

== History ==
Sonterswil is first mentioned in 1296 as Sundratswile. Pottery from the Bronze Age and the Hallstatt period has been found in Hohrain. In 1296 the bishop of Constance sold a farm in Sonterswil to Feldbach Abbey. From 1460 to 1798 Sonterswil, as a Hohes Gericht (high court), was subject to the Thurgau bailiff (Landvogt). Until 1859 the Reformed village belonged to the parish of Wigoltingen, and since then it has belonged to the parish of Lipperswil. In 1949 Gunterswilen and Hohrain moved from the parish of Ermatingen to that of Wäldi. From 1801 to 2004 Sonterswil had a school, which it shared with Hefenhausen from 1845 and also with Engwilen from 1853; since 2005 Sonterswil has belonged to the school community (Volksschulgemeinde) of Wigoltingen.

Arable farming under the three-field system continued into the 19th century, alongside fruit growing, grassland farming and dairy farming. Around 1835 the embroidery works of the Ebinger brothers, with ten employees, operated in Sonterswil.

The Ortsgemeinde had 233 inhabitants in 1850, 182 in 1900, 207 in 1950 and 171 in 1990.

== Bibliography ==
- Hinweisinventar alter Bauten und Ortsbilder im Kanton Thurgau: Sonterswil, 1990
- S. Hochuli, Wäldi-Hohenrain TG, 1990
- Regine Abegg, Peter Erni and Alfons Raimann, Rund um Kreuzlingen, 2014, pp. 402–405 (Die Kunstdenkmäler des Kantons Thurgau, 8)
