= Engwilen =

Village in Thurgau, Switzerland

- Former municipality
- Location of Engwilen
- Location within Switzerland Location within Canton of Thurgau
- Coordinates: 47.617°N 9.09472°E
- Country: Switzerland
- Canton: Thurgau
- District: Kreuzlingen
- Municipality: Wäldi

Population (1990)
  - Total: 170
- Time zone: UTC+01:00 (CET)
  - Summer (DST): UTC+02:00 (CEST)
- ISO 3166 code: CH-TG
- Website

Engwilen is a former Ortsgemeinde (local commune) in the canton of Thurgau, Switzerland, which has been part of the municipality of Wäldi in the district of Kreuzlingen since 1995. The village lies on the southern slope of the Seerücken, near the motorway from Winterthur to Constance.

== History ==
Engwilen is first mentioned between 1301 and 1307 as Engwille. In the Middle Ages it lay on the southwestern edge of the former Bischofshöri, the temporal domain of the episcopal church of Constance, and belonged to the episcopal Obervogtei (high bailiwick) of Gottlieben. Until 1798 the low court of Engwilen was held by three free Engwilen families, the Egloff, Engwiler and Meyer, as a fief of the bishop of Constance. An Offnung (record of customary law) of 1532 set out, among other things, the villagers' obligations to the episcopal see: when the bishop traveled, for example to Rome, they had to provide a packhorse driver (Säumer), an obligation known as Sintlehen.

Mostly Reformed since the Reformation, Engwilen still belongs to the parish of Lipperswil. The few Catholic inhabitants attended Mass in the parish of Homburg, and since 1869 they have belonged to the Catholic parish of Kreuzlingen-Emmishofen.

In the 19th century arable farming gave way to dairy farming, livestock breeding and fruit growing. In 1955 the metal construction company Paul Zöllig AG (now Thur Metall AG) settled in Engwilen. More recently the village has become a rural residential community.

Engwilen had 161 inhabitants in 1850, 163 in 1900, 175 in 1950 and 170 in 1990.

== Bibliography ==
- H. Maurer, "Die Bischofshöri", in Freiburger Diözesan-Archiv, 100, 1980, pp. 19–21
- Hinweisinventar alter Bauten und Ortsbilder im Kanton Thurgau, manuscript, 1997 (State Archives of Thurgau)
- Regine Abegg, Peter Erni and Alfons Raimann, Rund um Kreuzlingen, 2014, pp. 389–391 (Die Kunstdenkmäler des Kantons Thurgau, 8)
