= Lipperswil =

Village in Thurgau, Switzerland

- Former municipality
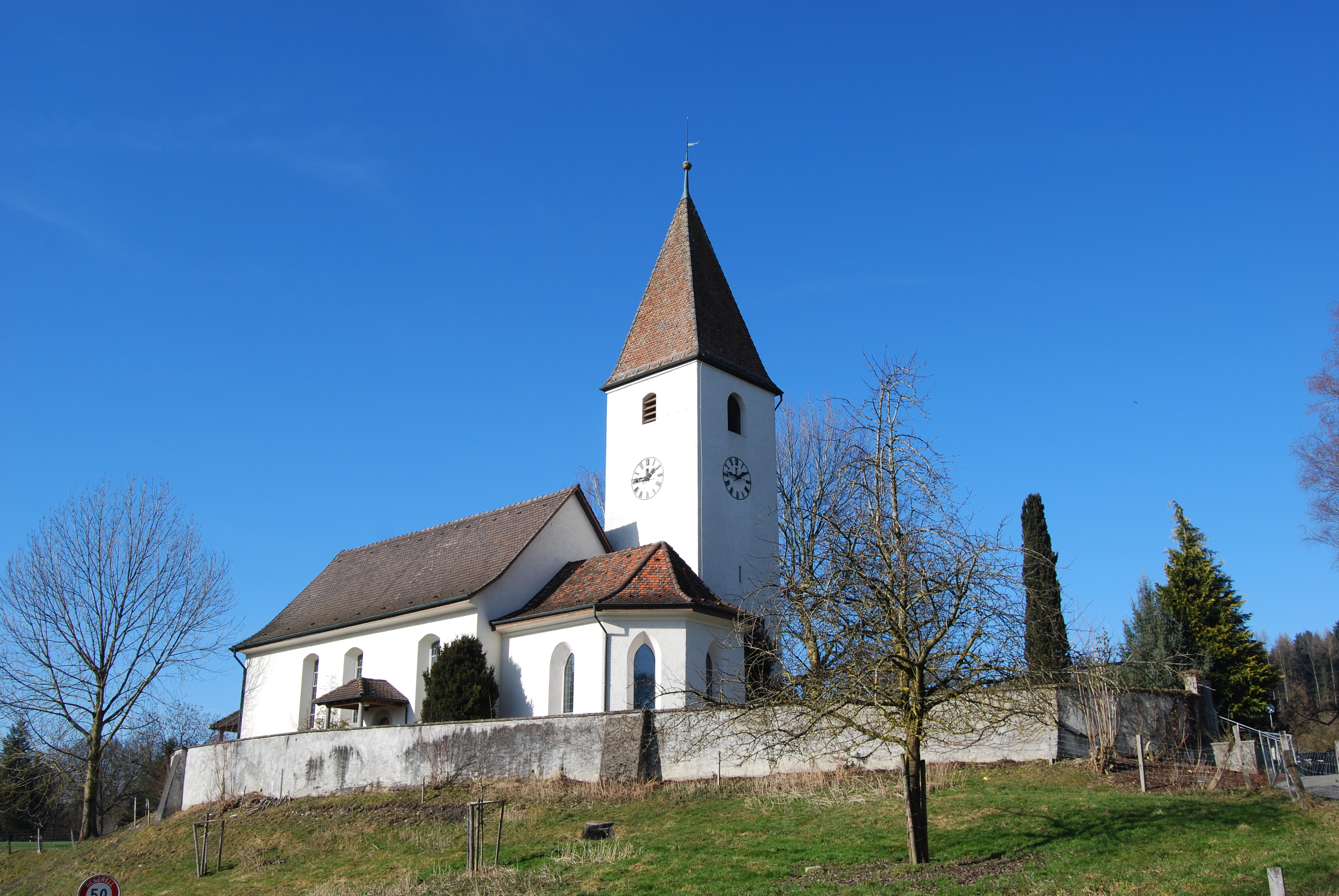
- Reformed church
- Location of Lipperswil
- Location within Switzerland Location within Canton of Thurgau
- Coordinates: 47.6162°N 9.05346°E
- Country: Switzerland
- Canton: Thurgau
- District: Kreuzlingen
- Municipality: Wäldi

Population (1990)
  - Total: 258
- Time zone: UTC+01:00 (CET)
  - Summer (DST): UTC+02:00 (CEST)
- ISO 3166 code: CH-TG
- Website

Lipperswil is a former Ortsgemeinde (local commune) in the canton of Thurgau, Switzerland, which has been part of the municipality of Wäldi in the district of Kreuzlingen since 1995. From 1803 to 1805 it belonged to the Munizipalgemeinde (municipal commune) of Müllheim, and then until 1994 to that of Wäldi. Lipperswil, with Hattenhausen and Hefenhausen, lies on the southern slope of the Seerücken, north of the motorway.

== History ==
Lipperswil is first mentioned in 1252 as Luimprechtswilær. In 1284 the barons of Bürglen sold Lipperswil, together with the right of patronage of its church (Kirchensatz), to the canons of St. John's in Constance, who held the low court until 1798. Hattenhausen and Hefenhausen together formed a court, which the owners of the castles of Salenstein and Hard administered in turn until 1798. The church, formerly a daughter church of Wigoltingen, adopted the Reformation in 1529. Besides Raperswilen, the pastor of Lipperswil served Wäldi after 1723 and also Sonterswil from 1859. In 1812 the Ortsgemeinden of Hattenhausen-Hefenhausen and Lipperswil were united to form the Ortsgemeinde of Lipperswil.

In the 19th century fruit growing and livestock and dairy farming replaced arable farming; viticulture continued into the 20th century. The mill, recorded in 1301, burned down in 1895. In the 19th century a weaving mill and a shoemaker's workshop provided work, and around 1900 an embroidery works, a sawmill and a cheese dairy. Today the village is shaped by the Conny-Land leisure park of the Gasser circus family and by the golf course opened in 1999.

Lipperswil had 307 inhabitants in 1850, 293 in 1900, 247 in 1950 and 258 in 1990.

== Bibliography ==
- Hinweisinventar alter Bauten und Ortsbilder im Kanton Thurgau, manuscript, 1995 (State Archives of Thurgau)
- Neue Zürcher Zeitung, 7 July 2004
- Regine Abegg, Peter Erni and Alfons Raimann, Rund um Kreuzlingen, 2014, pp. 392–401 (Die Kunstdenkmäler des Kantons Thurgau, 8)
