= Raperswilen =

- Municipality
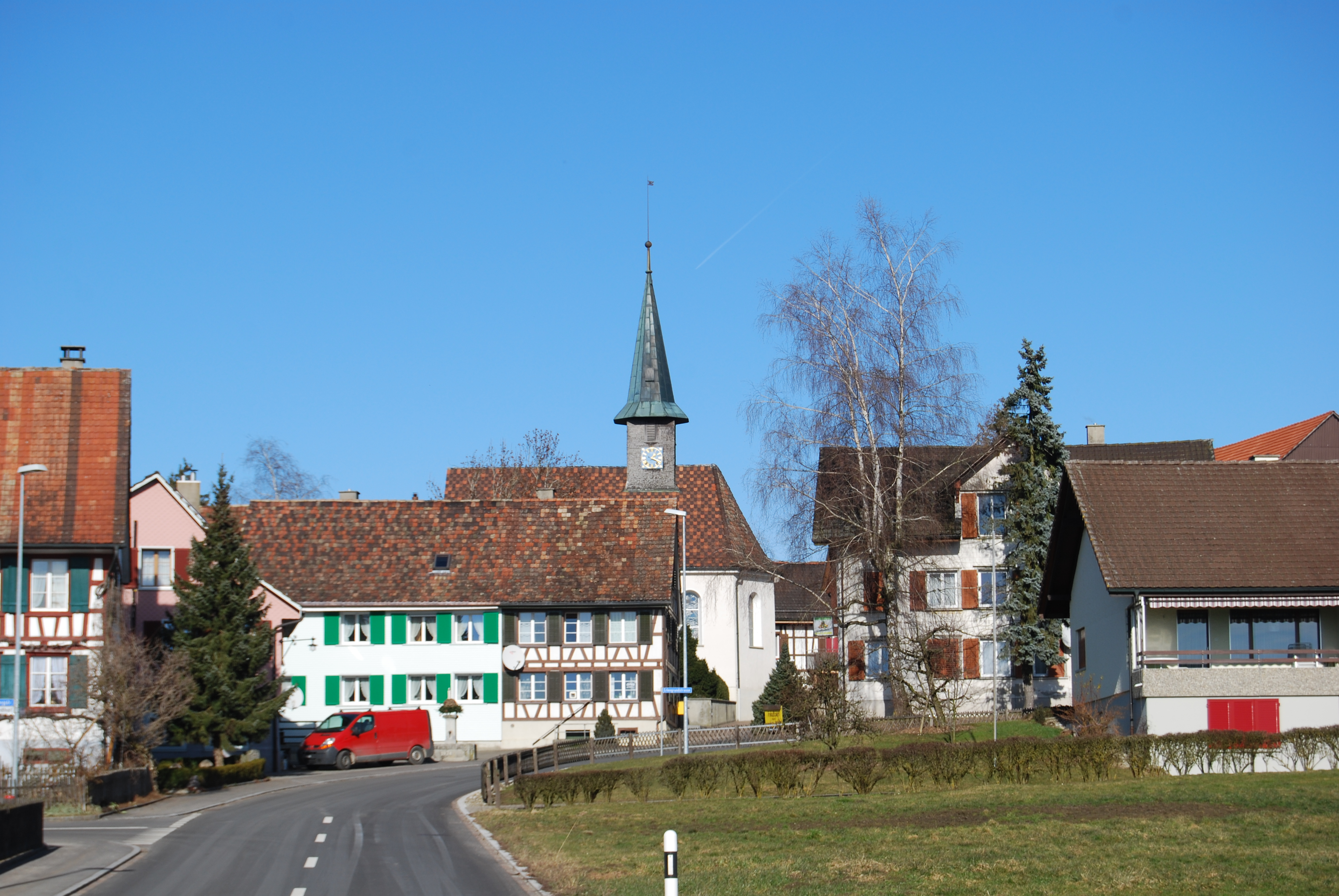

- Coat of arms
- Location of Raperswilen
- Location within Switzerland Location within Canton of Thurgau
- Coordinates: 47°38′N 9°10′E
- Country: Switzerland
- Canton: Thurgau
- District: Kreuzlingen

Area
  - Total: 7.67 km^{2} (2.96 sq mi)
- Elevation: 582 m (1,909 ft)

Population (December 2007)
  - Total: 397
  - Density: 51.8/km^{2} (134/sq mi)
- Time zone: UTC+01:00 (CET)
  - Summer (DST): UTC+02:00 (CEST)
- Postal code: 8558
- SFOS number: 4846
- ISO 3166 code: CH-TG
- Localities: Büren; Fischbach; Helsighausen; Müllberg
- Surrounded by: Berlingen; Ermatingen; Homburg; Salenstein; Steckborn; Wäldi; Wigoltingen
- Website: raperswilen.ch

Raperswilen is a municipality in Kreuzlingen District in the canton of Thurgau in Switzerland.

== History ==
Prehistorically, two fortifications existed within the borders of Raperswilen. Risi was a Bronze Age fort while Schanz was probably from the Iron Age. The modern village of Raperswilen is first mentioned in 1227 as Raperswilar. Büren and Müllberg hamlets belonged to the court of Klingenberg, while a part of Fischbach, Helsighausen and Raperwilen belonged to the court of Fruthwilen. Four houses in Fischbach belonged to the court of Hattenhausen and another six homes were directly under the Swiss Confederation Vogt in Thurgau. Raperswilen and Helsighausen are first mentioned together in 1616.

In 1529 the chapel in Raperswilen was deconsecrated and around 1560, it was used by the local Protestants for meetings. Starting in 1562 the pastor of Wigoltingen held services in the chapel. From 1661 until 1798, this duty was shared with the pastor of Lipperswil. The new church of Raperswilen was built in 1766 but still belonged to the Wigoltingen parish.

The English noble George Treherne built Müllberg Castle in 1854–66. In 1905 it was converted into a fresh air health spa (German: Luftkuranstalt). However, it burned down in 1914.

The economy of the municipality was dominated by orchards and agriculture, and later by livestock, dairy farming and forestry. Raperswilen has some wood processing companies, some light auto industry and a mica sand pit. Just over half the population commuted away from the municipality for work in 2000. In 2005 agriculture provided 43% of the jobs in the municipality.

== Geography ==
Raperswilen has an area, as of 2009, of 7.67 square kilometers (2.96 sq mi). Of this area, 5.18 km^{2} (2.00 sq mi) or 67.5% is used for agricultural purposes, while 2.1 km^{2} (0.81 sq mi) or 27.4% is forested. Of the rest of the land, 0.39 km^{2} (0.15 sq mi) or 5.1% is settled (buildings or roads).

Of the built up area, industrial buildings made up 2.9% of the total area while housing and buildings made up 0.4% and transportation infrastructure made up 0.7%. Out of the forested land, all of the forested land area is covered with heavy forests. Of the agricultural land, 64.3% is used for growing crops, while 3.3% is used for orchards or vine crops.

The municipality is located in Kreuzlingen District. It is located in the Seerücken hills. It consists of the village of Raperswilen and the hamlets of Büren, Fischbach, Helsighausen, Müllberg and Sonnenberg.

== Demographics ==
Raperswilen has a population (as of December 2020) of 416 As of 2008, 4.5% of the population are foreign nationals. Over the last 10 years (1997–2007) the population has changed at a rate of -13.6%. Most of the population (as of 2000) speaks German(97.9%), with French being second most common ( 0.7%) and Portuguese being third ( 0.5%).

As of 2008, the gender distribution of the population was 48.1% male and 51.9% female. The population was made up of 182 Swiss men (45.4% of the population), and 11 (2.7%) non-Swiss men. There were 201 Swiss women (50.1%), and 7 (1.7%) non-Swiss women. In 2008 there was 1 live birth to Swiss citizens and in same time span there were 4 deaths of Swiss citizens. Ignoring immigration and emigration, the population of Swiss citizens decreased by 3 while the foreign population remained the same. There was 1 Swiss woman who emigrated from Switzerland to another country and 2 non-Swiss men who emigrated from Switzerland to another country. The total Swiss population change in 2008 (from all sources) was an increase of 5 and the non-Swiss population change was a decrease of 3 people. This represents a population growth rate of 0.5%.

The age distribution, as of 2009, in Raperswilen is; 45 children or 11.2% of the population are between 0 and 9 years old and 51 teenagers or 12.7% are between 10 and 19. Of the adult population, 43 people or 10.7% of the population are between 20 and 29 years old. 46 people or 11.4% are between 30 and 39, 68 people or 16.9% are between 40 and 49, and 64 people or 15.9% are between 50 and 59. The senior population distribution is 43 people or 10.7% of the population are between 60 and 69 years old, 24 people or 6.0% are between 70 and 79, there are 17 people or 4.2% who are between 80 and 89, and there is 1 person who is 90 or older.

As of 2000, there were 146 private households in the municipality, and an average of 2.8 persons per household. In 2000 there were 64 single family homes (or 85.3% of the total) out of a total of 75 inhabited buildings. There were 8 two family buildings (10.7%), 2 three family buildings (2.7%) and 1 multi-family buildings (or 1.3%). There were 98 (or 23.0%) persons who were part of a couple without children, and 256 (or 60.1%) who were part of a couple with children. There were 28 (or 6.6%) people who lived in single parent home, while there are 3 persons who were adult children living with one or both parents, 2 who lived in a household made up of unrelated persons, and 10 who are either institutionalized or live in another type of collective housing. The vacancy rate for the municipality, in 2008, was 1.23%. As of 2007, the construction rate of new housing units was 2.5 new units per 1000 residents.

In 2000 there were 156 apartments in the municipality. The most common apartment size was the 4 room apartment of which there were 44. There were 3 single room apartments and 44 apartments with six or more rooms.

In the 2007 federal election the most popular party was the SVP which received 67.75% of the vote. The next three most popular parties were the FDP (7.99%), the CVP (7.4%) and the Green Party (7%). In the federal election, a total of 169 votes were cast, and the voter turnout was 56.9%.

The historical population is given in the following table:

year	population
1850	446
1900	430
1950	402
1980	287
1990	354
2000	426

== Economy ==
As of 2007, Raperswilen had an unemployment rate of 0.86%. As of 2005, there were 63 people employed in the primary economic sector and about 26 businesses involved in this sector. 51 people are employed in the secondary sector and there are 8 businesses in this sector. 32 people are employed in the tertiary sector, with 10 businesses in this sector.

In 2000 there were 304 workers who lived in the municipality. Of these, 120 or about 39.5% of the residents worked outside Raperswilen while 29 people commuted into the municipality for work. There were a total of 213 jobs (of at least 6 hours per week) in the municipality. Of the working population, 5% used public transportation to get to work, and 46.2% used a private car.

== Religion ==
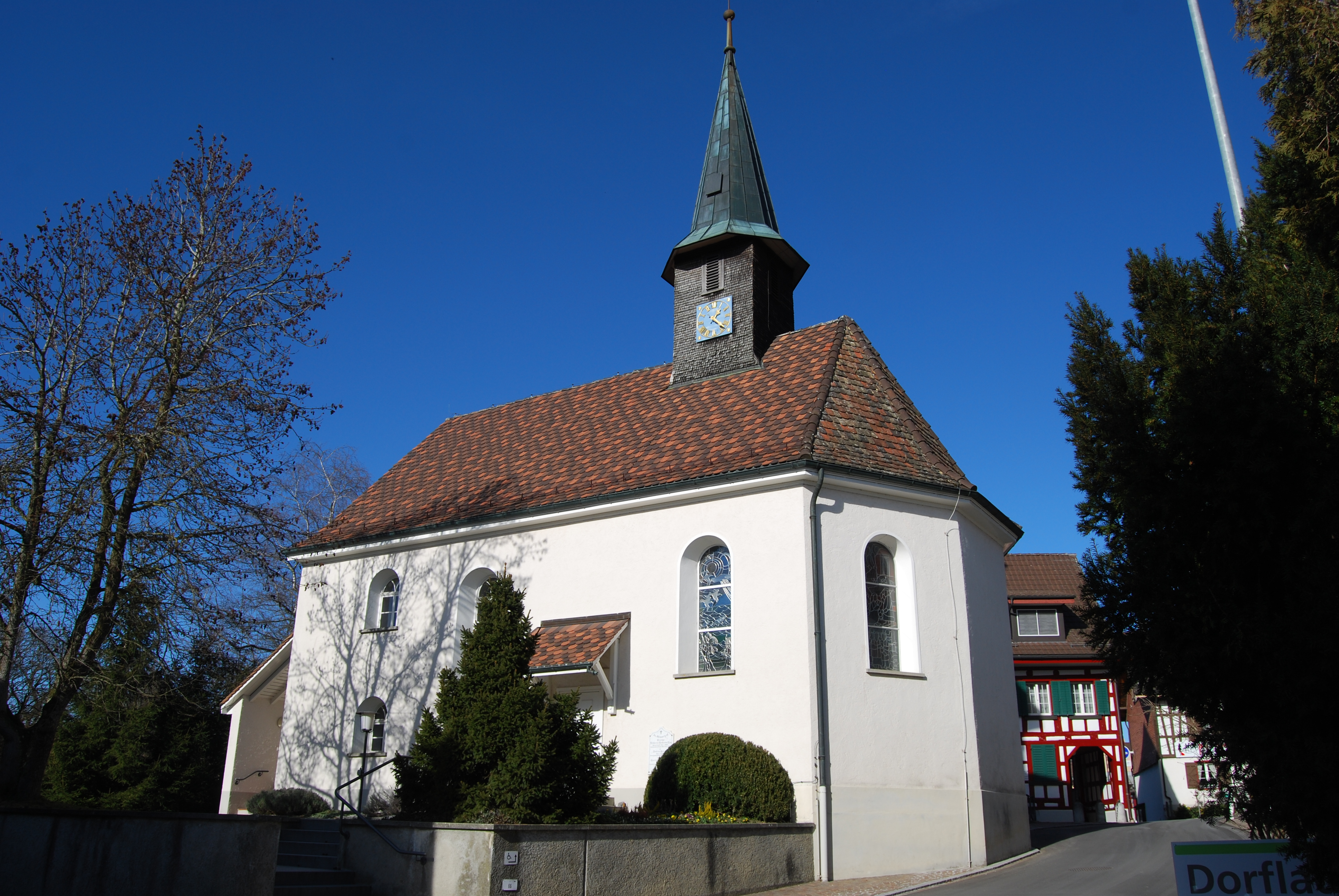
Raperswilen church

From the 2000 census, 74 or 17.4% were Roman Catholic, while 300 or 70.4% belonged to the Swiss Reformed Church. Of the rest of the population, there is 1 individual who belongs to the Orthodox Church, and there are 13 individuals (or about 3.05% of the population) who belong to another Christian church. There were 2 (or about 0.47% of the population) who are Islamic. There are 1 individuals (or about 0.23% of the population) who belong to another church (not listed on the census), 21 (or about 4.93% of the population) belong to no church, are agnostic or atheist, and 14 individuals (or about 3.29% of the population) did not answer the question.

== Education ==
In Raperswilen about 69.3% of the population (between age 25–64) have completed either non-mandatory upper secondary education or additional higher education (either university or a Fachhochschule).
