= Mülheim (disambiguation) =

Mülheim is a city in North Rhine Westphalia, Germany.

Mülheim can also refer to:

- Mülheim, Cologne, a formerly independent town, that is now part of Cologne, Germany
- Mülheim an der Mosel, a municipality in Rhineland-Palatinate, Germany
- Mülheim-Kärlich, a municipality in Rhineland-Palatinate, Germany
- MV RMS Mulheim, cargo ship wrecked off Cornwall, 2003

== See also ==
- Mühlheim
- Müllheim im Markgräflerland, Germany
- Müllheim, Switzerland
