= Marvin Pfründer =

Swiss footballer (born 1994)

Personal information
- Full name: Marvin Pfründer
- Date of birth: 28 January 1994 (age 32)
- Place of birth: Märstetten, Switzerland
- Height: 1.86 m (6 ft 1 in)
- Position: Right back

Senior career*
Years	Team	Apps	(Gls)
2011–2013	Sampdoria	33	(0)
2013–2015	Grasshopper II	32	(0)
2015–2016	FC Köniz	27	(2)
2016–2018	FC Vaduz	13	(0)
2018–2019	FC Köniz	19	(1)
- * Club domestic league appearances and goals as of 20:00, 7 August 2019 (UTC)

Marvin Pfründer (born 28 January 1994) is a Swiss footballer who most recently played for FC Köniz.

== Career ==
Pfründer returned to FC Köniz in the summer 2018 for the second time. He left the club at the end of the season again.

== Honours ==
FC Vaduz

- Liechtenstein Football Cup: 2016-17
