= Mühlheim =

Mühlheim may refer to several places in Germany and Austria:

- Mühlheim am Main, in Hesse, Germany
- Mühlheim an der Donau, in Baden-Württemberg, Germany
- Mühlheim am Inn, in Upper Austria, Austria

== See also ==
- Mülheim (disambiguation)
- Müllheim im Markgräflerland, in Baden-Württemberg, Germany
- Müllheim, Switzerland, the Canton of Thurgau, Switzerland
