= Märstetten =

- Municipality
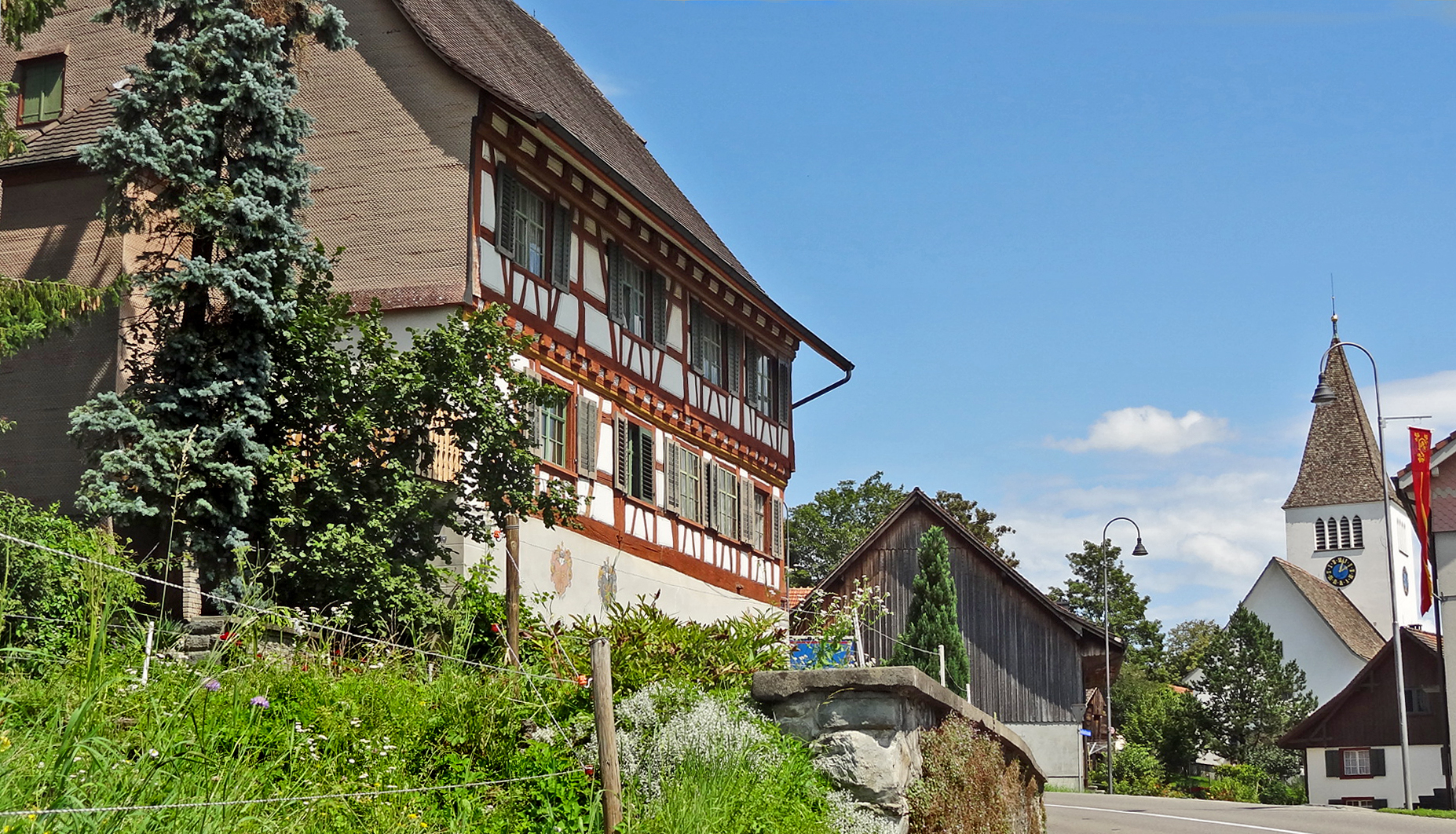

- Coat of arms
- Location of Märstetten
- Location within Switzerland Location within Canton of Thurgau
- Coordinates: 47°36′N 9°4′E
- Country: Switzerland
- Canton: Thurgau
- District: Weinfelden

Area
  - Total: 9.97 km^{2} (3.85 sq mi)
- Elevation: 425 m (1,394 ft)

Population (31.03.2026)
  - Total: 3,084
  - Density: 309/km^{2} (801/sq mi)
- Time zone: UTC+01:00 (CET)
  - Summer (DST): UTC+02:00 (CEST)
- Postal code: 8560
- SFOS number: 4941
- ISO 3166 code: CH-TG
- Surrounded by: Amlikon-Bissegg, Kemmental, Weinfelden, Wigoltingen
- Website: www.maerstetten.ch

Märstetten is a municipality in the district of Weinfelden in the canton of Thurgau in Switzerland.

== History ==
Scattered finds from the Neolithic era, Roman ruins and a series of grave from the Early Middle Ages show that there was a continuous settlement in the area. In the High Middle Ages the Baron of Märstetten had a castle located above the church. The modern municipality of Märstetten is first mentioned in 1155 as Marsteten when the Cathedral of Constance granted it as a fief to the Freiherr von Klingen. The court of Märstetten included the village as well as Illhart and Wigoltingen. In 1724 a portion of Ruberbaum and some other farms were added to the court. In 1395 the court was acquired by Wilhelm von Enne, followed by the Muntprat family in 1419. This was followed by the Breitenlandenberg family in 1441, the Brümsi family in 1559, and Leonhart Zollikofer in 1585. The court remained with Leonhart's family until 1798. The appellate court for Märstetten was the Lord of Altenklingen, then after, 1460 the Governor of Thurgau and later the federal Tagsatzung.

The village was responsible to pay tithes to the Cathedral of Constance. In 1613, the Cathedral canon, Salomon Buchhorner, had a new manor house (German: Kehlhof) which administered the villages of Boltshausen, Illhart, Sonterswil, Märstetten, and Ottoberg.

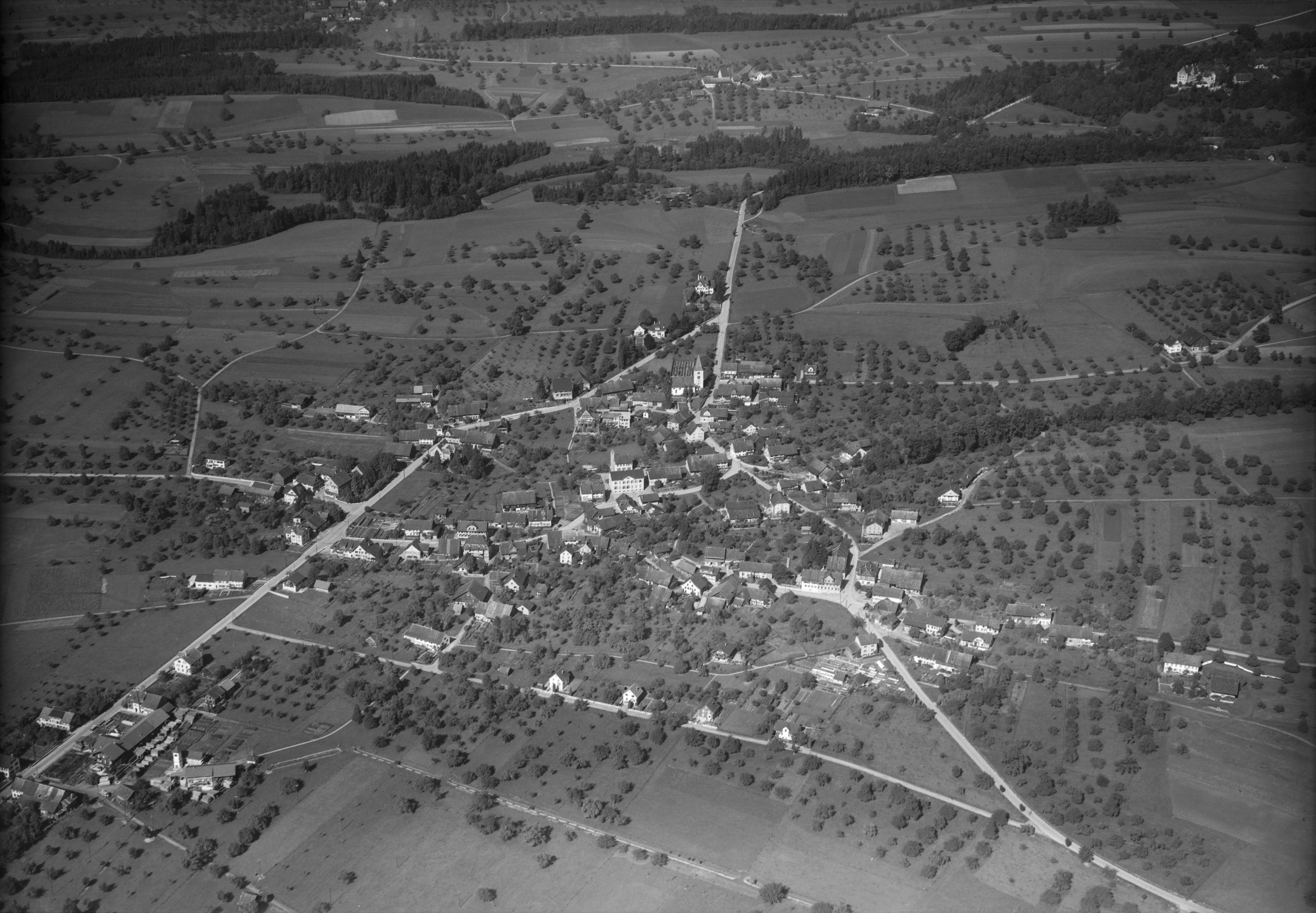
Aerial view (1949)

The church of St. Jakob, which was under the pilgrimage church of Einsiedeln, was originally the personal church of the Baron. After 1155 it belonged to the lands of the Cathedral of Constance. Between 1242 and 1487, the church was a branch of Wigoltingen. Without the consent of the governing church, St. Jakob's broke away from the parish in 1465. In 1482 Pope Sixtus IV issued a papal bull which granted the village the right to hire a lay priest. The Protestant Reformation prevailed in the village in 1529, though the Mass was permitted between 1594 and 1795. Until 1798 the parish included the so-called inner municipality of Märstetten, the outer municipality of Ottoberg and scattered farm houses.

Starting in 1860, the citizens and residents gathered on St. Hilary's day (13 January) for the municipal, local and school community meeting, as well as the so-called Hilärimahl meal.

== Geography ==
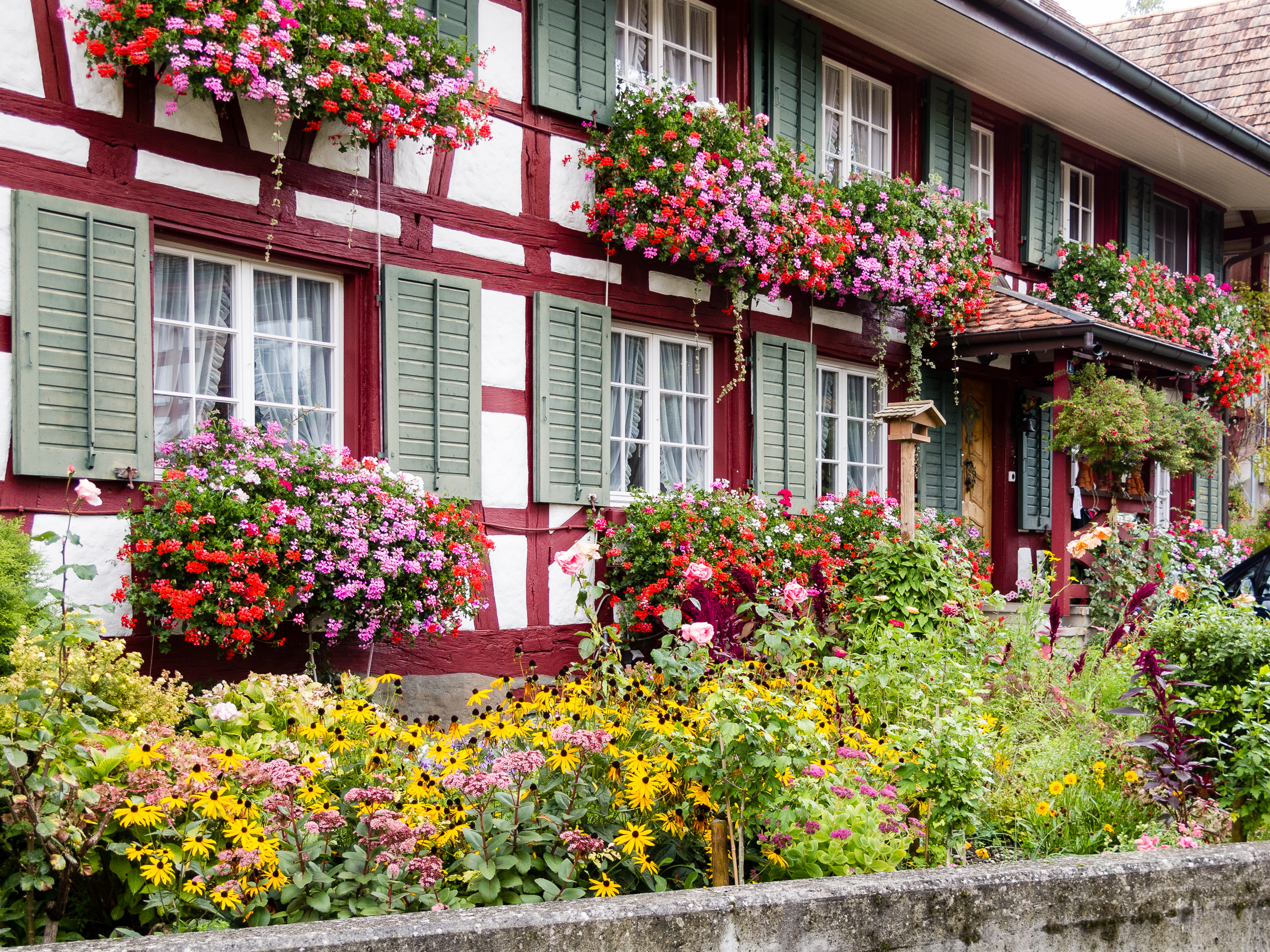
Farm house in Ottoberg

Märstetten has an area, as of 2009, of 9.97 square kilometers (3.85 sq mi). Of this area, 6.73 km^{2} (2.60 sq mi) or 67.5% is used for agricultural purposes, while 1.98 km^{2} (0.76 sq mi) or 19.9% is forested. Of the rest of the land, 1.18 km^{2} (0.46 sq mi) or 11.8% is settled (buildings or roads), 0.05 km^{2} (12 acres) or 0.5% is either rivers or lakes.

Of the built up area, industrial buildings made up 6.1% of the total area while housing and buildings made up 1.2% and transportation infrastructure made up 0.8%. while parks, green belts and sports fields made up 3.7%. Out of the forested land, 17.9% of the total land area is heavily forested and 2.0% is covered with orchards or small clusters of trees. Of the agricultural land, 62.2% is used for growing crops, while 5.3% is used for orchards or vine crops. Of the water in the municipality, 0.3% is in lakes and 0.2% is in rivers and streams.

The municipality is located in the Weinfelden district, on the western foot of the Ottenberg. It is at the intersection of the Zürich-Romanshorn and Wil-Constance roads. It consists of the haufendorf village (an irregular, unplanned and quite closely packed village, built around a central square) of Märstetten and the hamlets of Boltshausen, Altenburg, Dattenhub and Ruberbaum as well as the former Ortsgemeinde of Ottoberg.

== Demographics ==
Märstetten has a population (as of December 2020) of 2,896. As of 2008, 10.6% of the population are foreign nationals. Over the last 10 years (1997–2007) the population has changed at a rate of 9.9%. Most of the population (as of 2000) speaks German (94.8%), with Albanian being second most common ( 1.6%) and Italian being third ( 0.8%).

As of 2008, the gender distribution of the population was 49.4% male and 50.6% female. The population was made up of 1,057 Swiss men (43.5% of the population), and 144 (5.9%) non-Swiss men. There were 1,116 Swiss women (45.9%), and 114 (4.7%) non-Swiss women.

In 2008 there were 14 live births to Swiss citizens and 4 births to non-Swiss citizens, and in same time span there were 11 deaths of Swiss citizens. Ignoring immigration and emigration, the population of Swiss citizens increased by 3 while the foreign population increased by 4. There were 1 Swiss woman who emigrated from Switzerland to another country, 1 non-Swiss man who emigrated from Switzerland to another country and 5 non-Swiss women who emigrated from Switzerland to another country. The total Swiss population change in 2008 (from all sources) was an increase of 23 and the non-Swiss population change was an increase of 2 people. This represents a population growth rate of 1.0%.

The age distribution, as of 2009, in Märstetten is; 269 children or 11.0% of the population are between 0 and 9 years old and 385 teenagers or 15.7% are between 10 and 19. Of the adult population, 290 people or 11.8% of the population are between 20 and 29 years old. 326 people or 13.3% are between 30 and 39, 448 people or 18.3% are between 40 and 49, and 323 people or 13.2% are between 50 and 59. The senior population distribution is 220 people or 9.0% of the population are between 60 and 69 years old, 124 people or 5.1% are between 70 and 79, there are 54 people or 2.2% who are between 80 and 89, and there are 15 people or 0.6% who are 90 and older.

As of 2000, there were 862 private households in the municipality, and an average of 2.6 persons per household. In 2000 there were 400 single family homes (or 84.7% of the total) out of a total of 472 inhabited buildings. There were 27 two family buildings (5.7%), 7 three family buildings (1.5%) and 38 multi-family buildings (or 8.1%). There were 553 (or 24.8%) persons who were part of a couple without children, and 1,283 (or 57.4%) who were part of a couple with children. There were 93 (or 4.2%) people who lived in single parent home, while there are 15 persons who were adult children living with one or both parents, 14 persons who lived in a household made up of relatives, 16 who lived in a household made up of unrelated persons, and 28 who are either institutionalized or live in another type of collective housing.

The vacancy rate for the municipality, in 2008, was 1.41%. As of 2007, the construction rate of new housing units was 4.2 new units per 1000 residents. In 2000 there were 926 apartments in the municipality. The most common apartment size was the 4 room apartment of which there were 249. There were 10 single room apartments and 213 apartments with six or more rooms. As of 2000 the average price to rent an average apartment in Märstetten was 1111.11 Swiss francs (CHF) per month (US$890, £500, €710 approx. exchange rate from 2000). The average rate for a one-room apartment was 434.00 CHF (US$350, £200, €280), a two-room apartment was about 681.89 CHF (US$550, £310, €440), a three-room apartment was about 906.80 CHF (US$730, £410, €580) and a six or more room apartment cost an average of 1679.33 CHF (US$1340, £760, €1070). The average apartment price in Märstetten was 99.6% of the national average of 1116 CHF.

In the 2007 federal election the most popular party was the SVP which received 38.62% of the vote. The next three most popular parties were the FDP (18.31%), the CVP (12.21%) and the SP (11.97%). In the federal election, a total of 875 votes were cast, and the voter turnout was 53.8%.

The historical population is given in the following table:

year	population
1850	1,009
1900	1,030
1950	1,251
1970	1,295
1990	1,865
2000	2,234

== Heritage sites of national significance ==
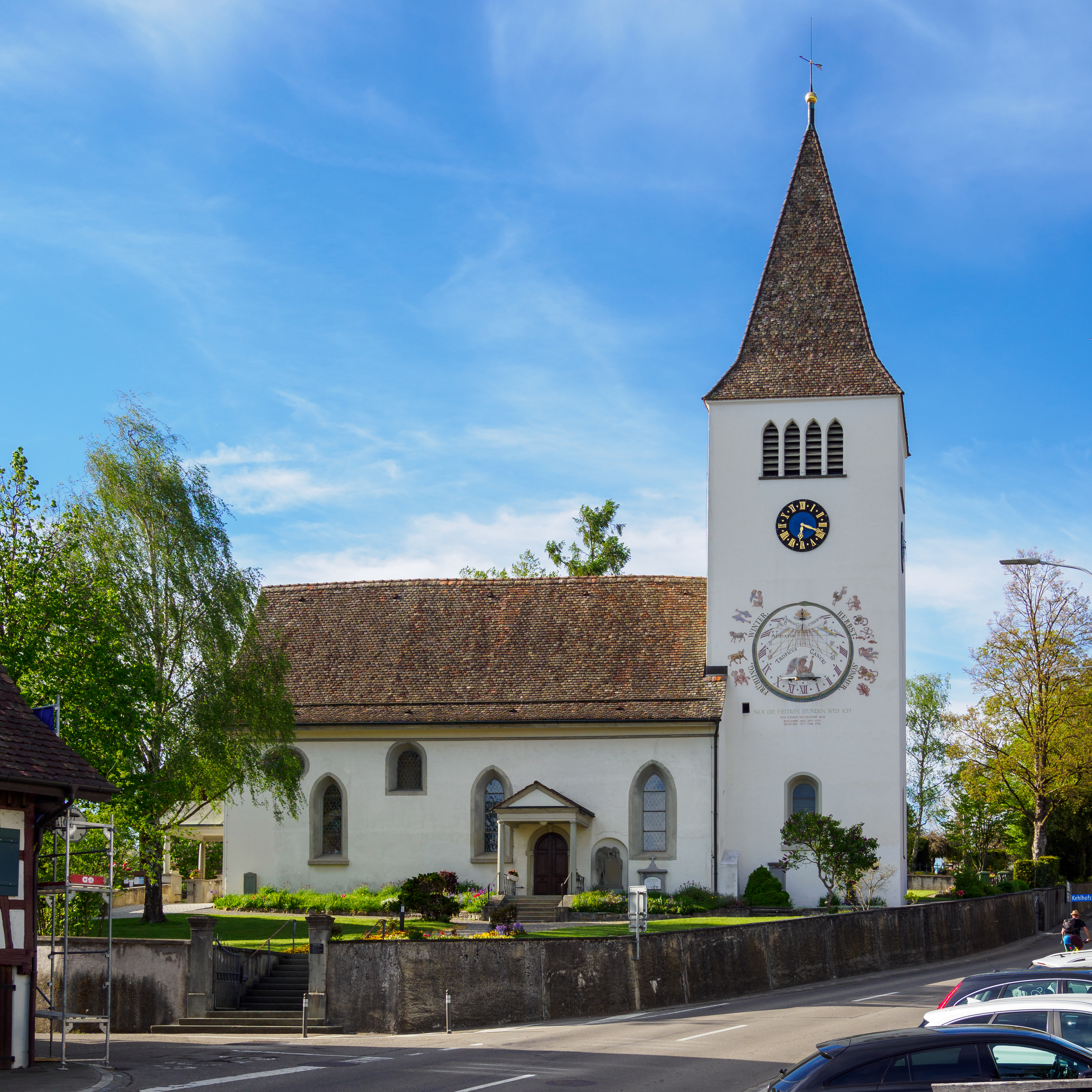
Church of St. Jacob

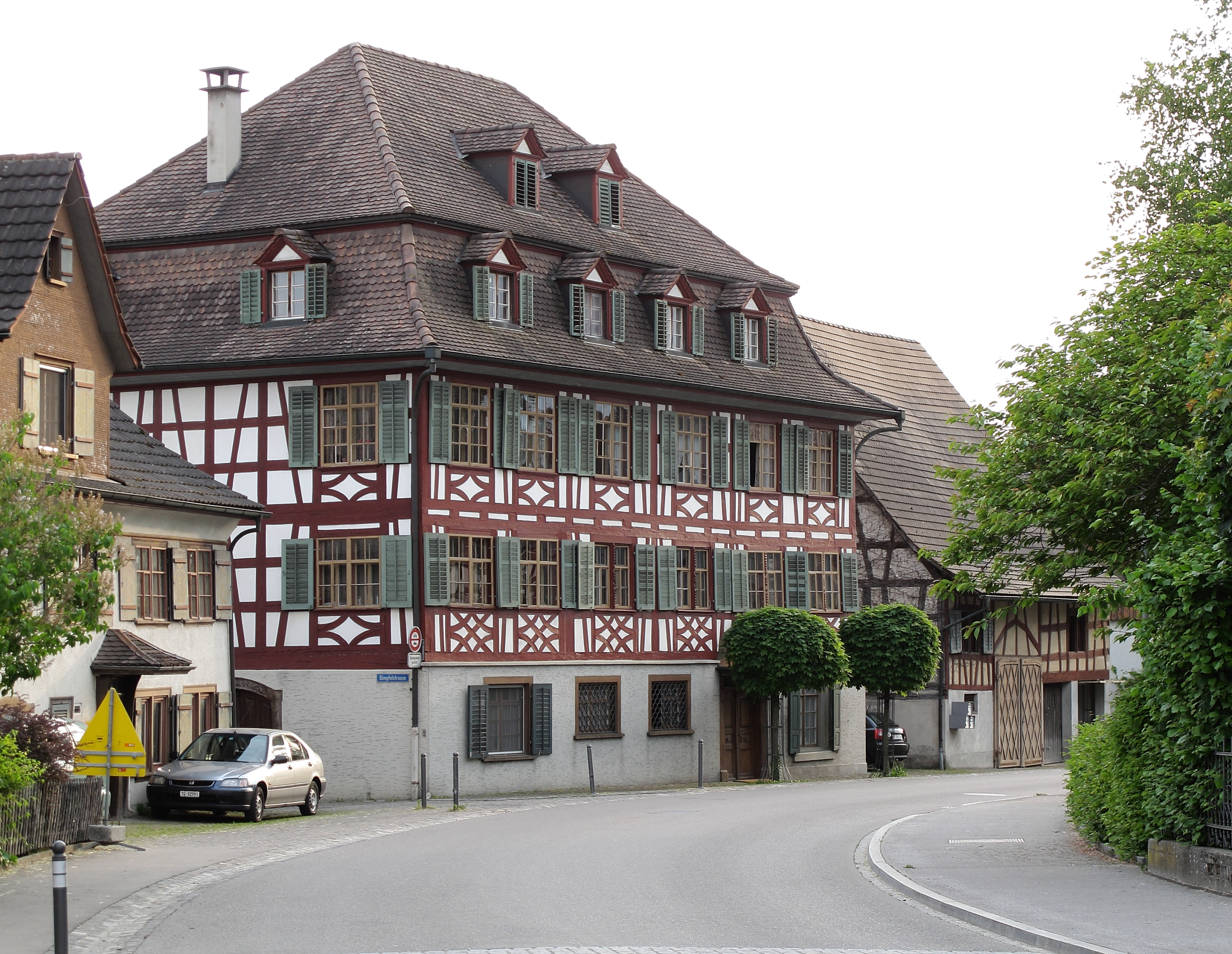
The old Lion

The Hohes Haus and the Church of St. Jakob are listed as Swiss heritage sites of national significance. The villages of Märstetten and Ottoberg, the hamlet of Boltshausen and the Ottenberg Südhang area are all listed as part of the Inventory of Swiss Heritage Sites.

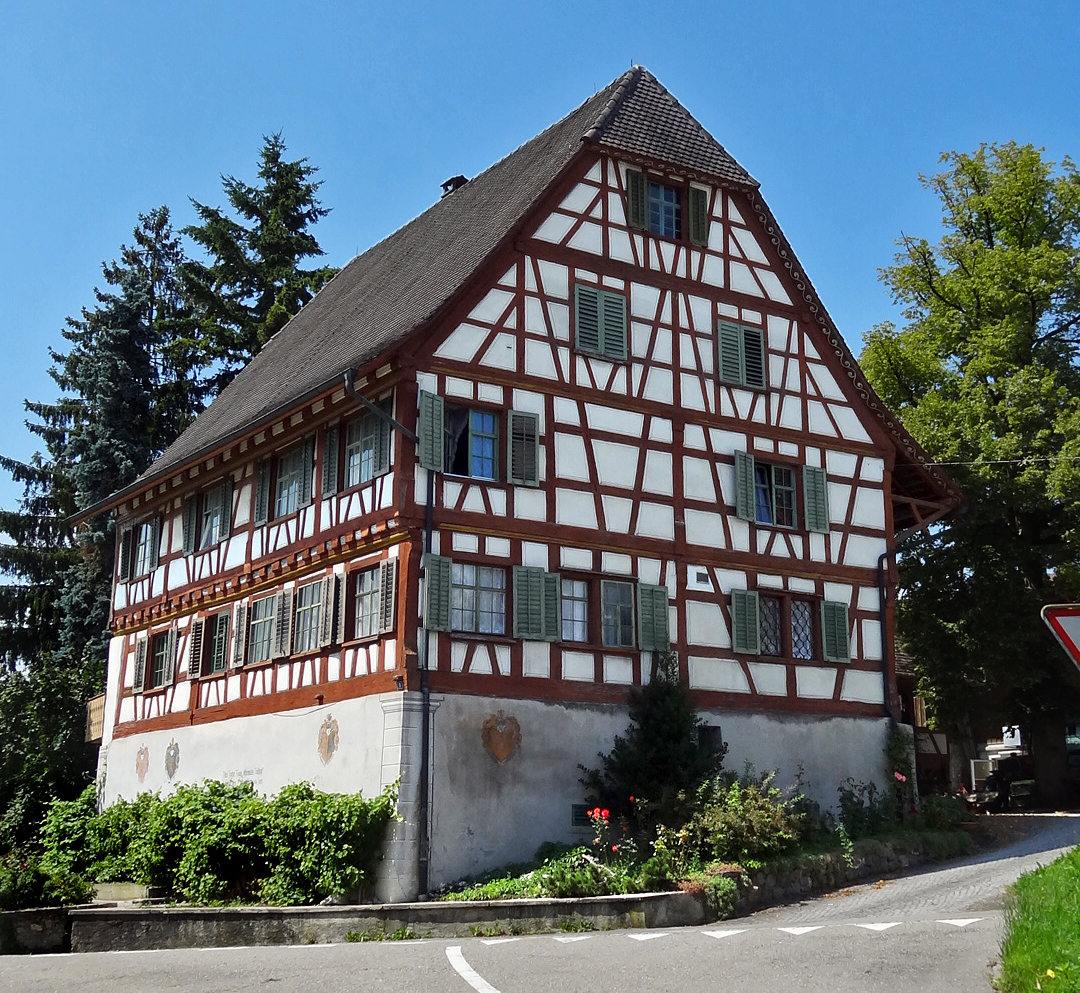
The Hohes Haus

The Hohes Haus is a half-timbered building which was built in 1613 by Salomon Buchhorner, from the Cathedral of Constance, as a tithe barn. A court room was added in 1620. The walls are decorated with late Renaissance paneling and carvings. The building was restored in 1972.

The Church of St. Jakob was first mentioned in 1155 as chapel under the administration of the Cathedral of Constance. The combined bell tower and choir was probably built in the 13th or 14th century. In 1465 the nave was extended toward the west and the tower was raised. The sacristy was added in 1489, bringing the church to its current appearance. In the same year it was raised to a parish church and the center of a local parish. The baptismal font was added in 1590. The pulpit was built in 1790. The sundial was painted in 1808 by Conrad Boltshauser and restored in 1954. During a renovation in 1975, two frescos were discovered. The Weihnachtsgeschichte or Christmas Story was painted in the 15th century, while the Last Judgement is from around 1460–70. The church is shared between the Reformed and Roman Catholic residents, with Reformed services at 9:30 and Catholic Mass at 11:15. For Catholics the church is a chapel under the parish of Weinfelden.

== Economy ==
As of 2007, Märstetten had an unemployment rate of 1.46%. As of 2005, there were 124 people employed in the primary economic sector and about 48 businesses involved in this sector. 307 people are employed in the secondary sector and there are 36 businesses in this sector. 450 people are employed in the tertiary sector, with 70 businesses in this sector. In 2000 there were 1,587 workers who lived in the municipality. Of these, 856 or about 53.9% of the residents worked outside Märstetten while 417 people commuted into the municipality for work. There were a total of 1,148 jobs (of at least 6 hours per week) in the municipality. Of the working population, 9.5% used public transportation to get to work, and 56.2% used a private car.

== Religion ==
From the 2000 census, 573 or 25.6% were Roman Catholic, while 1,247 or 55.8% belonged to the Swiss Reformed Church. Of the rest of the population, there was 1 Old Catholic who belonged to the Christian Catholic Church of Switzerland there are 9 individuals (or about 0.40% of the population) who belong to the Orthodox Church, and there are 78 individuals (or about 3.49% of the population) who belong to another Christian church. There were 78 (or about 3.49% of the population) who are Islamic. There are 6 individuals (or about 0.27% of the population) who belong to another church (not listed on the census), 155 (or about 6.94% of the population) belong to no church, are agnostic or atheist, and 87 individuals (or about 3.89% of the population) did not answer the question.

== Education ==
In Märstetten about 75.1% of the population (between age 25–64) have completed either non-mandatory upper secondary education or additional higher education (either university or a Fachhochschule).

Märstetten is home to the Märstetten primary school district. In the 2008/2009 school year there were 190 students. There were 42 children in the kindergarten, and the average class size was 21 kindergartners. Of the children in kindergarten, 17 or 40.5% were female, 9 or 21.4% were not Swiss citizens and 4 or 9.5% did not speak German natively. The lower and upper primary levels begin at about age 5-6 and last for 6 years. There were 59 children in who were at the lower primary level and 89 children in the upper primary level. The average class size in the primary school was 18.5 students. At the lower primary level, there were 29 children or 49.2% of the total population who were female, 8 or 13.6% were not Swiss citizens and 8 or 13.6% did not speak German natively. In the upper primary level, 38 or 42.7% students were female, 10 or 11.2% were not Swiss citizens and 5 or 5.6% did not speak German natively.

== Transport ==
Märstetten railway station is a stop of the Zürich S-Bahn on services S24 and S30.
