= Wäldi =

- Municipality
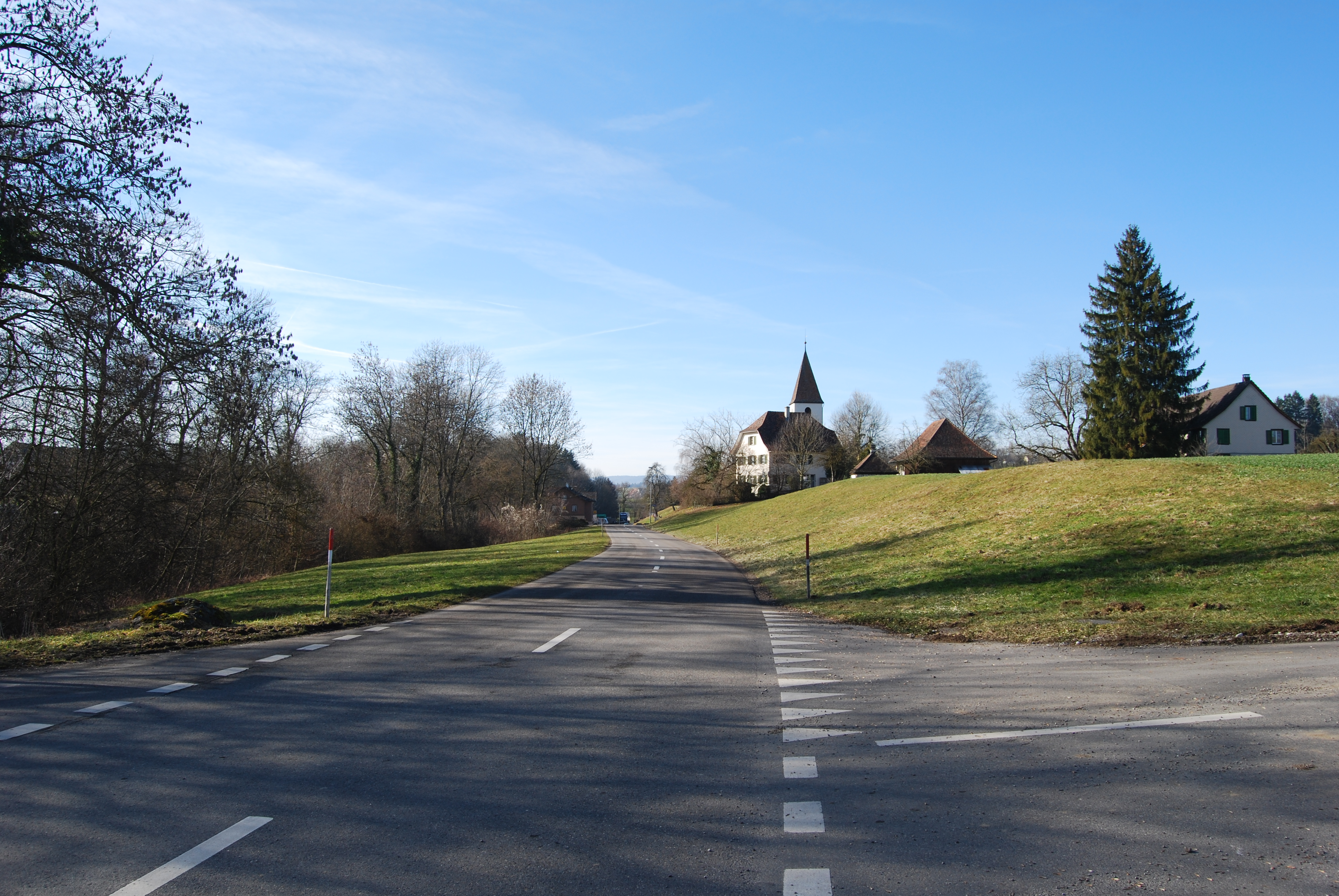

- Coat of arms
- Location of Wäldi
- Location within Switzerland Location within Canton of Thurgau
- Coordinates: 47°38′N 9°5′E
- Country: Switzerland
- Canton: Thurgau
- District: Kreuzlingen

Area
  - Total: 12.23 km^{2} (4.72 sq mi)
- Elevation: 610 m (2,000 ft)

Population (December 2007)
  - Total: 960
  - Density: 78/km^{2} (200/sq mi)
- Time zone: UTC+01:00 (CET)
  - Summer (DST): UTC+02:00 (CEST)
- Postal code: 8564
- SFOS number: 4701
- ISO 3166 code: CH-TG
- Surrounded by: Ermatingen, Kemmental, Raperswilen, Tägerwilen, Wigoltingen
- Website: www.waeldi.ch

Wäldi is a municipality in the district of Kreuzlingen in the canton of Thurgau in Switzerland.

== Geography ==
Wäldi has an area, as of 2009, of 12.23 square kilometers (4.72 sq mi). Of this area, 9.13 km^{2} (3.53 sq mi) or 74.7% is used for agricultural purposes, while 2.05 km^{2} (0.79 sq mi) or 16.8% is forested. Of the rest of the land, 1.03 km^{2} (0.40 sq mi) or 8.4% is settled (buildings or roads), 0.01 km^{2} (2.5 acres) or 0.1% is either rivers or lakes.

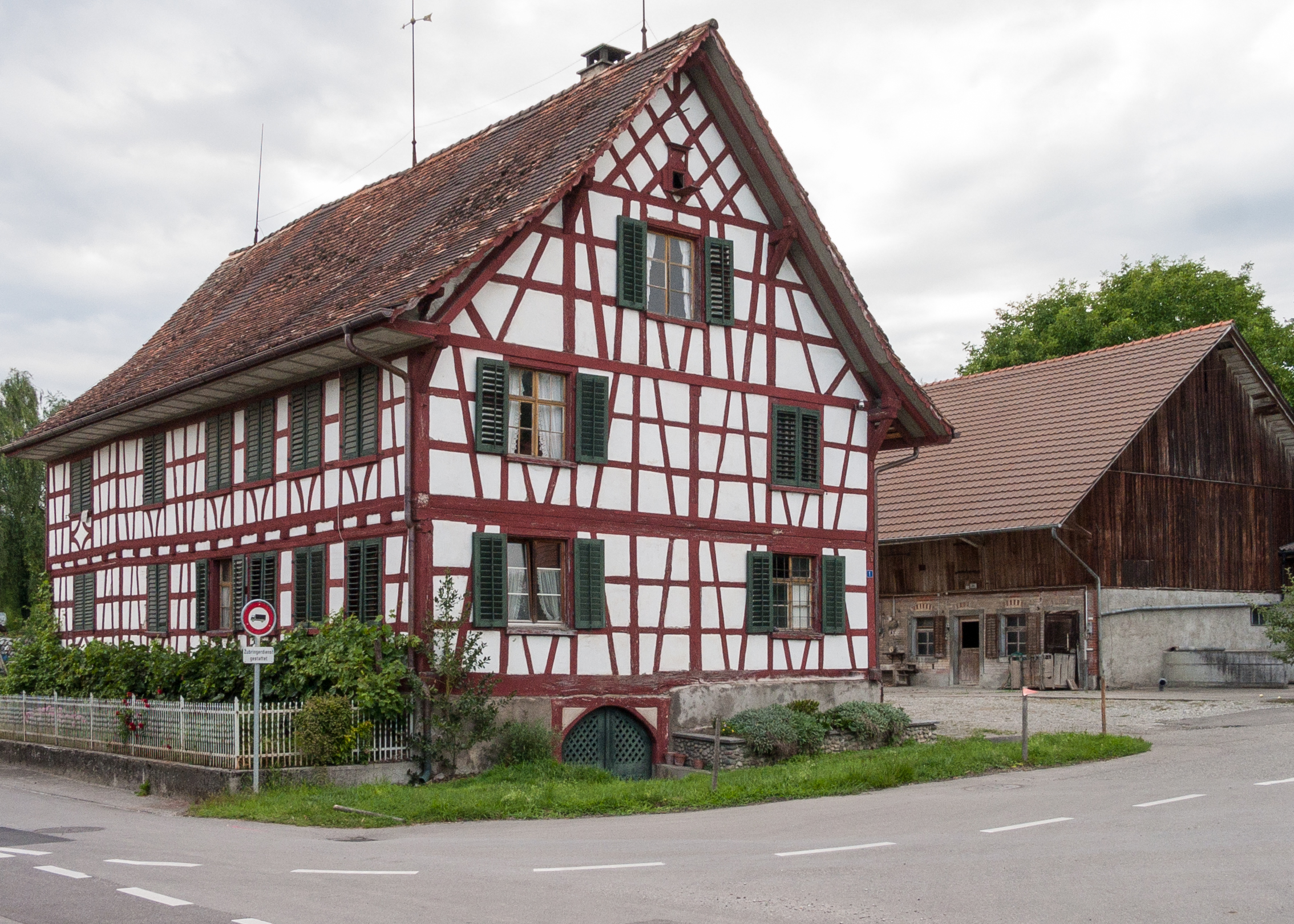
Timber framed farm house in the village of Sonterswil

Of the built up area, industrial buildings made up 2.5% of the total area while housing and buildings made up 0.3% and transportation infrastructure made up 0.2%. while parks, green belts and sports fields made up 4.9%. Out of the forested land, 15.4% of the total land area is heavily forested and 1.4% is covered with orchards or small clusters of trees. Of the agricultural land, 72.3% is used for growing crops, while 2.4% is used for orchards or vine crops. All the water in the municipality is flowing water.

In 1995, Engwilen, Lipperswil and Sonterswil merged into Wäldi.

== Demographics ==
Wäldi has a population (as of December 2020) of 1,055. As of 2008, 7.7% of the population are foreign nationals. Over the last 10 years (1997–2007) the population has changed at a rate of 6.1%. Most of the population (as of 2000) speaks German (90.7%), with Polish being second most common ( 1.4%) and French being third ( 1.2%).

As of 2008, the gender distribution of the population was 52.5% male and 47.5% female. The population was made up of 444 Swiss men (47.6% of the population), and 45 (4.8%) non-Swiss men. There were 416 Swiss women (44.6%), and 27 (2.9%) non-Swiss women.

In 2008 there were 3 live births to Swiss citizens and births to non-Swiss citizens, and in same time span there were 4 deaths of Swiss citizens and 1 non-Swiss citizen death. Ignoring immigration and emigration, the population of Swiss citizens decreased by 1 while the foreign population decreased by 1. There were 2 Swiss women who emigrated from Switzerland to another country, 15 non-Swiss men who emigrated from Switzerland to another country and 2 non-Swiss women who emigrated from Switzerland to another country. The total Swiss population change in 2008 (from all sources) was a decrease of 6 and the non-Swiss population change was an increase of 13 people. This represents a population growth rate of 0.8%.

The age distribution, as of 2009, in Wäldi is; 71 children or 7.1% of the population are between 0 and 9 years old and 151 teenagers or 15.1% are between 10 and 19. Of the adult population, 128 people or 12.8% of the population are between 20 and 29 years old. 132 people or 13.2% are between 30 and 39, 180 people or 18.0% are between 40 and 49, and 167 people or 16.7% are between 50 and 59. The senior population distribution is 76 people or 7.6% of the population are between 60 and 69 years old, 55 people or 5.5% are between 70 and 79, there are 31 people or 3.1% who are between 80 and 89, and there are 7 people or 0.7% who are 90 and older.

As of 2000, there were 366 private households in the municipality, and an average of 2.5 persons per household. In 2000 there were 155 single family homes (or 88.1% of the total) out of a total of 176 inhabited buildings. There were 14 two family buildings (8.0%), 6 three family buildings (3.4%) and 1 multi-family buildings (or .6%). There were 193 (or 19.9%) persons who were part of a couple without children, and 545 (or 56.2%) who were part of a couple with children. There were 37 (or 3.8%) people who lived in single parent home, while there are 13 persons who were adult children living with one or both parents, 8 persons who lived in a household made up of relatives, 6 who lived in a household made up of unrelated persons, and 52 who are either institutionalized or live in another type of collective housing.

The vacancy rate for the municipality, in 2008, was 1.85%. As of 2007, the construction rate of new housing units was 3.2 new units per 1000 residents. In 2000 there were 347 apartments in the municipality. The most common apartment size was the 5 room apartment of which there were 111. There were 9 single room apartments and 99 apartments with six or more rooms. As of 2000 the average price to rent an average apartment in Wäldi was 1211.01 Swiss francs (CHF) per month (US$970, £540, €780 approx. exchange rate from 2000). The average rate for a one-room apartment was 300.00 CHF (US$240, £140, €190), a two-room apartment was about 780.00 CHF (US$620, £350, €500), a three-room apartment was about 899.27 CHF (US$720, £400, €580) and a six or more room apartment cost an average of 1660.00 CHF (US$1330, £750, €1060). The average apartment price in Wäldi was 108.5% of the national average of 1116 CHF.

In the 2007 federal election the most popular party was the SVP which received 63.57% of the vote. The next three most popular parties were the Green Party (10.65%), the FDP (9.57%) and the CVP (5.42%). In the federal election, a total of 360 votes were cast, and the voter turnout was 52.9%.

The historical population is given in the following table:

year	population
1950	818
1960	830
1980	704
1990	789
2000	970

== Economy ==
As of 2007, Wäldi had an unemployment rate of 1.37%. As of 2005, there were 123 people employed in the primary economic sector and about 50 businesses involved in this sector. 105 people are employed in the secondary sector and there are 18 businesses in this sector. 240 people are employed in the tertiary sector, with 30 businesses in this sector.

In 2000 there were 626 workers who lived in the municipality. Of these, 267 or about 42.7% of the residents worked outside Wäldi while 160 people commuted into the municipality for work. There were a total of 519 jobs (of at least 6 hours per week) in the municipality. Of the working population, 4.5% used public transportation to get to work, and 47.7% used a private car.

== Religion ==
From the 2000 census, 155 or 16.0% were Roman Catholic, while 586 or 60.4% belonged to the Swiss Reformed Church. Of the rest of the population, and there are 32 individuals (or about 3.30% of the population) who belong to another Christian church. There were 6 (or about 0.62% of the population) who are Islamic. There are 4 individuals (or about 0.41% of the population) who belong to another church (not listed on the census), 80 (or about 8.25% of the population) belong to no church, are agnostic or atheist, and 107 individuals (or about 11.03% of the population) did not answer the question.

== Education ==
In Wäldi about 66.6% of the population (between age 25–64) have completed either non-mandatory upper secondary education or additional higher education (either university or a Fachhochschule).
