= George Treherne =

Canadian ice hockey player

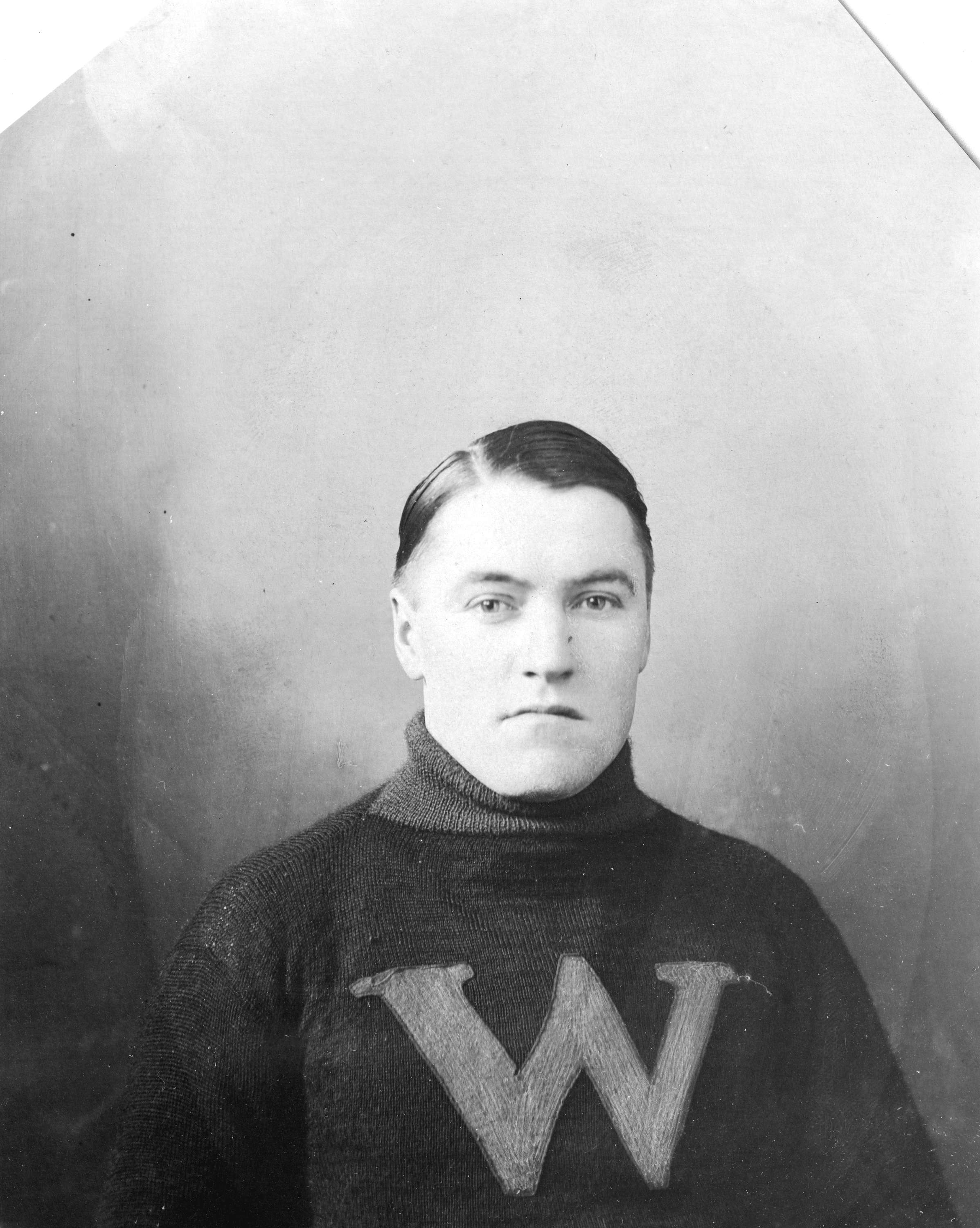
- George Treherne in 1912 with the New Westminster Royals.
- Born: July 15, 1884 Brandon, Manitoba, Canada
- Died: August 15, 1964 (aged 80) San Francisco County, California, USA
- Position: Centre
- Played for: New Westminster Royals
- Playing career: 1905–1916

George Arthur "Ike" Treherne (July 15, 1884 – August 15, 1964) was a Canadian professional ice hockey center. Treherne played professionally with the New Westminster Royals in the Pacific Coast Hockey Association in 1912 and 1913.

== Statistics ==
| | | | Regular season | | | | | Playoffs |
| Season | Team | League | GP | G | A | Pts | PIM | GP | G | A | Pts | PIM |
|---|---|---|---|---|---|---|---|---|---|---|---|---|
| 1912 | New Westminster Royals | PCHA | 4 | 3 | 0 | 3 | 5 | — | — | — | — | — |
| 1912–13 | New Westminster Royals | PCHA | 1 | 0 | 1 | 1 | 0 | — | — | — | — | — |
| PCHA totals | | | 5 | 3 | 1 | 4 | 5 | — | — | — | — | — |
