= Homburg, Switzerland =

Homburg
- Municipality
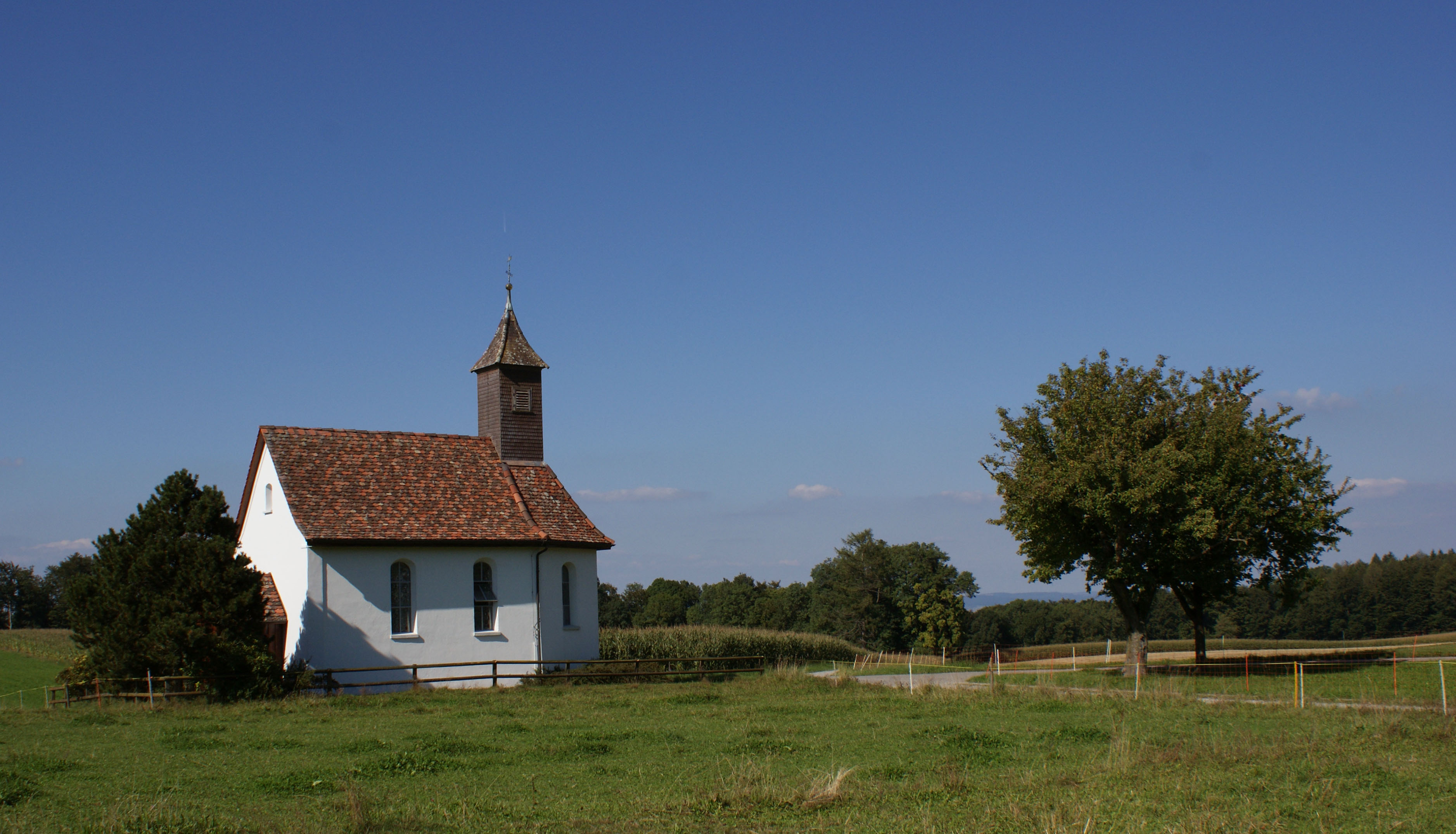
- Chapel of St.Antonius, Salen-Reutenen

- Coat of arms
- Location of Homburg
- Location within Switzerland Location within Canton of Thurgau
- Coordinates: 47°38′N 9°1′E
- Country: Switzerland
- Canton: Thurgau
- District: Frauenfeld

Area
  - Total: 24.15 km^{2} (9.32 sq mi)
- Elevation: 591 m (1,939 ft)

Population (December 2007)
  - Total: 1,433
  - Density: 59.34/km^{2} (153.7/sq mi)
- Time zone: UTC+01:00 (CET)
  - Summer (DST): UTC+02:00 (CEST)
- Postal code: 8508
- SFOS number: 4816
- ISO 3166 code: CH-TG
- Surrounded by: Herdern, Mammern, Müllheim, Pfyn, Raperswilen, Steckborn, Wigoltingen
- Website: homburg.ch

Homburg (Swiss Standard German pronunciation: [ˈhɔmbʊrɡ]) is a municipality in Frauenfeld District in the canton of Thurgau in Switzerland.

== History ==
Homburg is first mentioned in 899 as Hohenperc. In 1243 it was mentioned as de Honburch. From the Middle Ages until 1798 it was part of the lands of Klingenberg Castle. Between 1651 and 1798, Muri Abbey held the Herrschaft rights and they granted the low court to their governor who lived at the castle. The parish of Homburg covered the same land as the Herrschaft. After the Protestant Reformation of 1528, in 1532 the old faith was restored. Both faiths used the same church until the 1555/56 when the Reformed worship was ended. In the 19th century livestock, dairy farming and fruit production began to replace agriculture. The dairy cooperative building was built in 1866–67. Despite the a small industry base, Herzog Küchen AG, and the construction of some houses Homburg has remained a farming village.

== Geography ==
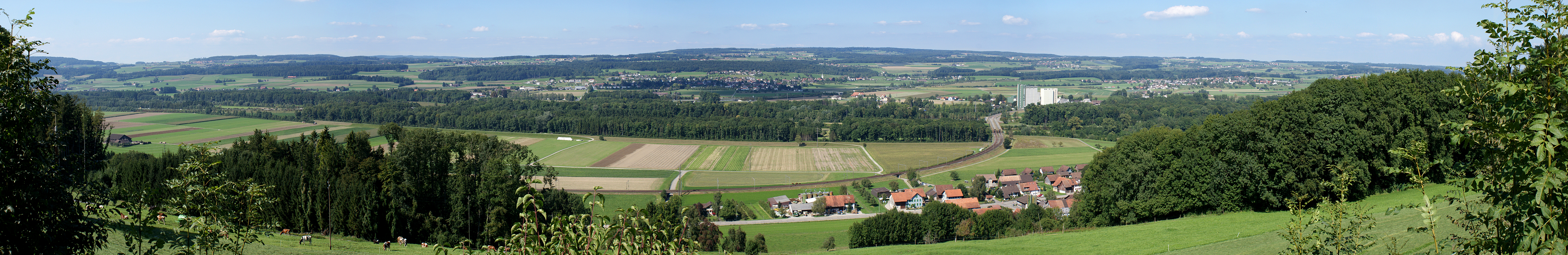
Panoramic of the Seerücken hills, with Homburg in the background

Homburg has an area, as of 2009, of 24.15 square kilometers (9.32 sq mi). Of this area, 16.88 km^{2} (6.52 sq mi) or 69.9% is used for agricultural purposes, while 5.81 km^{2} (2.24 sq mi) or 24.1% is forested. Of the rest of the land, 1.36 km^{2} (0.53 sq mi) or 5.6% is settled (buildings or roads), 0.03 km^{2} (7.4 acres) or 0.1% is either rivers or lakes and 0.02 km^{2} (4.9 acres) or 0.1% is unproductive land.

Of the built up area, industrial buildings made up 3.0% of the total area while housing and buildings made up 0.2% and transportation infrastructure made up 0.3%. while parks, green belts and sports fields made up 2.2%. Out of the forested land, all of the forested land area is covered with heavy forests. Of the agricultural land, 65.1% is used for growing crops, while 4.8% is used for orchards or vine crops. All the water in the municipality is flowing water. Of the unproductive areas, and .

The municipality is located in Frauenfeld District, on the southern slope of the Seerücken hills and north of Müllheim. From 1870 until 1998 the village of Homburg, the hamlet of Hörstetten and Klingenberg Castle formed the municipality of Homburg. After 1999 it merged with the Ortsgemeinde of Gündelhart-Hörhausen and Salen-Reutenen to form the political municipality of Homburg.

== Demographics ==
Homburg has a population (as of December 2020) of 1,543 As of 2008, 4.2% of the population are foreign nationals. Over the last 10 years (1997–2007) the population has changed at a rate of 72.2%. Most of the population (as of 2000) speaks German (97.9%), with Albanian being second most common (0.8%) and Portuguese being third (0.3%).

As of 2008, the gender distribution of the population was 50.5% male and 49.5% female. The population was made up of 692 Swiss men (48.2% of the population), and 33 (2.3%) non-Swiss men. There were 684 Swiss women (47.6%), and 28 (1.9%) non-Swiss women. In 2008 there were 13 live births to Swiss citizens and in same time span there were 10 deaths of Swiss citizens. Ignoring immigration and emigration, the population of Swiss citizens increased by 3 while the foreign population remained the same. There were 2 Swiss men who emigrated from Switzerland to another country, 2 Swiss women who emigrated from Switzerland to another country, 7 non-Swiss men who emigrated from Switzerland to another country and 6 non-Swiss women who emigrated from Switzerland to another country. The total Swiss population change in 2008 (from all sources) was an increase of 4 and the non-Swiss population change was a decrease of 3 people. This represents a population growth rate of 0.1%.

The age distribution, as of 2009, in Homburg is; 148 children or 10.1% of the population are between 0 and 9 years old and 214 teenagers or 14.6% are between 10 and 19. Of the adult population, 171 people or 11.7% of the population are between 20 and 29 years old. 169 people or 11.6% are between 30 and 39, 237 people or 16.2% are between 40 and 49, and 217 people or 14.8% are between 50 and 59. The senior population distribution is 167 people or 11.4% of the population are between 60 and 69 years old, 80 people or 5.5% are between 70 and 79, there are 57 people or 3.9% who are between 80 and 89, and there are 3 people or 0.2% who are 90 and older.

As of 2000, there were 500 private households in the municipality, and an average of 2.8 persons per household. In 2000 there were 244 single family homes (or 88.4% of the total) out of a total of 276 inhabited buildings. There were 19 two family buildings (6.9%), 4 three family buildings (1.4%) and 9 multi-family buildings (or 3.3%). There were 279 (or 19.5%) persons who were part of a couple without children, and 946 (or 66.1%) who were part of a couple with children. There were 48 (or 3.4%) people who lived in single parent home, while there are 13 persons who were adult children living with one or both parents, 10 persons who lived in a household made up of relatives, 8 who lived in a household made up of unrelated persons, and 21 who are either institutionalized or live in another type of collective housing.

The vacancy rate for the municipality, in 2008, was 0.71%. As of 2007, the construction rate of new housing units was 5.6 new units per 1000 residents. In 2000 there were 529 apartments in the municipality. The most common apartment size was the 6-room apartment of which there were 183. There were 8 single room apartments and 183 apartments with six or more rooms. As of 2000 the average price to rent an average apartment in Homburg was 1110.18 Swiss francs (CHF) per month (US$890, £500, €710 approx. exchange rate from 2000). The average rate for a one-room apartment was 1000.00 CHF (US$800, £450, €640), a two-room apartment was about 673.20 CHF (US$540, £300, €430), a three-room apartment was about 1012.27 CHF (US$810, £460, €650) and a six or more room apartment cost an average of 1236.00 CHF (US$990, £560, €790). The average apartment price in Homburg was 99.5% of the national average of 1116 CHF.

In the 2007 federal election the most popular party was the SVP which received 57.28% of the vote. The next three most popular parties were the CVP (13.68%), the FDP (11.45%) and the SP (4.55%). In the federal election, a total of 548 votes were cast, and the voter turnout was 51.1%.

The historical population is given in the following table:

year	population
1850	1,203
1860	1,253
1870	1,217
1880	1,114
1890	1,065
1900	991
1950	1,291
1960	1,278
1980	1,071
1990	1,248
2000	1,432

== Sights ==
The hamlet of Gündelhart is designated as part of the Inventory of Swiss Heritage Sites.

== Economy ==
As of 2007, Homburg had an unemployment rate of 1.02%. As of 2005, there were 248 people employed in the primary economic sector and about 98 businesses involved in this sector. 278 people are employed in the secondary sector and there are 28 businesses in this sector. 148 people are employed in the tertiary sector, with 31 businesses in this sector. In 2000 there were 1,011 workers who lived in the municipality. Of these, 443 or about 43.8% of the residents worked outside Homburg while 247 people commuted into the municipality for work. There were a total of 815 jobs (of at least 6 hours per week) in the municipality. Of the working population, 4.3% used public transportation to get to work, and 50.7% used a private car.

== Religion ==
From the 2000 census, 588 or 41.1% were Roman Catholic, while 654 or 45.7% belonged to the Swiss Reformed Church. Of the rest of the population, there is 1 individual who belongs to the Orthodox Church, and there are 63 individuals (or about 4.40% of the population) who belong to another Christian church. There were 2 individuals (or about 0.14% of the population) who were Jewish, and 14 (or about 0.98% of the population) who are Islamic. 70 (or about 4.89% of the population) belong to no church, are agnostic or atheist, and 40 individuals (or about 2.79% of the population) did not answer the question.

== Education ==
The entire Swiss population is generally well educated. In Homburg about 77.8% of the population (between age 25–64) have completed either non-mandatory upper secondary education or additional higher education (either university or a Fachhochschule).

Homburg is home to the Homburg-Hörstetten primary school district. In the primary school district there are 88 students who are in kindergarten or the primary level. There are 16 children in the kindergarten, and the average class size is 16 kindergartners. Of the children in kindergarten, 11 or 68.8% are female, 1 or 6.3% are not Swiss citizens. The lower and upper primary levels begin at about age 5-6 and lasts for 6 years. There are 28 children in who are at the lower primary level and 44 children in the upper primary level. The average class size in the primary school is 24 students. At the lower primary level, there are 16 children or 57.1% of the total population who are female, 5 or 17.9% are not Swiss citizens. In the upper primary level, there are 23 or 52.3% who are female, 1 or 2.3% are not Swiss citizens.

== Climate ==
Climate data for Salen-Reutenen, elevation 719 m (2,359 ft), (1991–2020) (Homburg since 1999)
Month	Jan	Feb	Mar	Apr	May	Jun	Jul	Aug	Sep	Oct	Nov	Dec	Year
Mean daily maximum °C (°F)	1.6 (34.9)	3.2 (37.8)	7.9 (46.2)	12.4 (54.3)	16.6 (61.9)	20.3 (68.5)	22.0 (71.6)	21.6 (70.9)	17.0 (62.6)	11.9 (53.4)	5.9 (42.6)	2.5 (36.5)	11.9 (53.4)
Daily mean °C (°F)	−0.2 (31.6)	0.6 (33.1)	4.4 (39.9)	8.4 (47.1)	12.5 (54.5)	16.1 (61.0)	17.8 (64.0)	17.5 (63.5)	13.2 (55.8)	9.0 (48.2)	3.9 (39.0)	0.6 (33.1)	8.7 (47.7)
Mean daily minimum °C (°F)	−2.0 (28.4)	−1.8 (28.8)	1.3 (34.3)	4.5 (40.1)	8.5 (47.3)	12.1 (53.8)	13.9 (57.0)	13.7 (56.7)	10.1 (50.2)	6.6 (43.9)	2.0 (35.6)	−1.1 (30.0)	5.7 (42.3)
Average precipitation mm (inches)	38.3 (1.51)	36.5 (1.44)	48.7 (1.92)	63.3 (2.49)	98.3 (3.87)	99.0 (3.90)	103.8 (4.09)	106.3 (4.19)	79.8 (3.14)	71.2 (2.80)	54.8 (2.16)	53.0 (2.09)	853.0 (33.58)
Average snowfall cm (inches)	23.2 (9.1)	28.5 (11.2)	18.9 (7.4)	7.8 (3.1)	0.0 (0.0)	0.0 (0.0)	0.0 (0.0)	0.0 (0.0)	0.0 (0.0)	1.5 (0.6)	13.1 (5.2)	23.5 (9.3)	116.5 (45.9)
Average precipitation days (≥ 1.0 mm)	8.5	8.1	9.2	9.4	11.2	11.2	12.0	11.3	9.6	10.0	9.6	10.4	120.5
Average snowy days (≥ 1.0 cm)	7.0	7.2	4.8	2.3	0.0	0.0	0.0	0.0	0.0	0.3	3.1	6.5	31.2
Average relative humidity (%)	87	82	76	71	73	73	72	75	81	87	89	89	80
Source 1: NOAA
Source 2: MeteoSwiss (snow 1981–2010)
