= Bischofshöri =

Medieval territory near Constance

The Bischofshöri was a territory on the northern edge of the Thurgau, within a radius of about 7 km south of the episcopal see of Constance. First mentioned in 854, it can be recognized as a once contiguous area of land owing dues and as part of the original endowment of the episcopal church of Constance. The most important service fiefs of the church of Constance lay there.

== History ==
The Bischofshöri is first mentioned in 854 in a diploma of Louis the German. In Frederick Barbarossa's privilege of 1155 for the episcopal church of Constance it is called a pagellus. This "small gau" (Kleingau), which lay within a radius of about 7 km south of the episcopal see of Constance, can be recognized as a once contiguous area of land owing dues (Zinsland) and as part of the original endowment (Ausstattungsgut) of the episcopal church.

Here, on the northern edge of the Thurgau, between Constance and Berg and between Gottlieben and Münsterlingen, lay the most important service fiefs (Dienstlehen) of the church of Constance. The whole district also seems to have belonged originally to the parish of St. Stephan in Constance.

== Bibliography ==
- H. Maurer, "Die Bischofshöri", in Freiburger Diözesan-Archiv 100, 1980, pp. 9–25
- P. Egger-Perler, "Namensschichten und Besiedlungschronologie zwischen Konstanz und St. Gallen", in Thurgauische Beiträge zur Geschichte 128, 1991, especially pp. 124–128, 153–154
