= Wigoltingen =

- Municipality
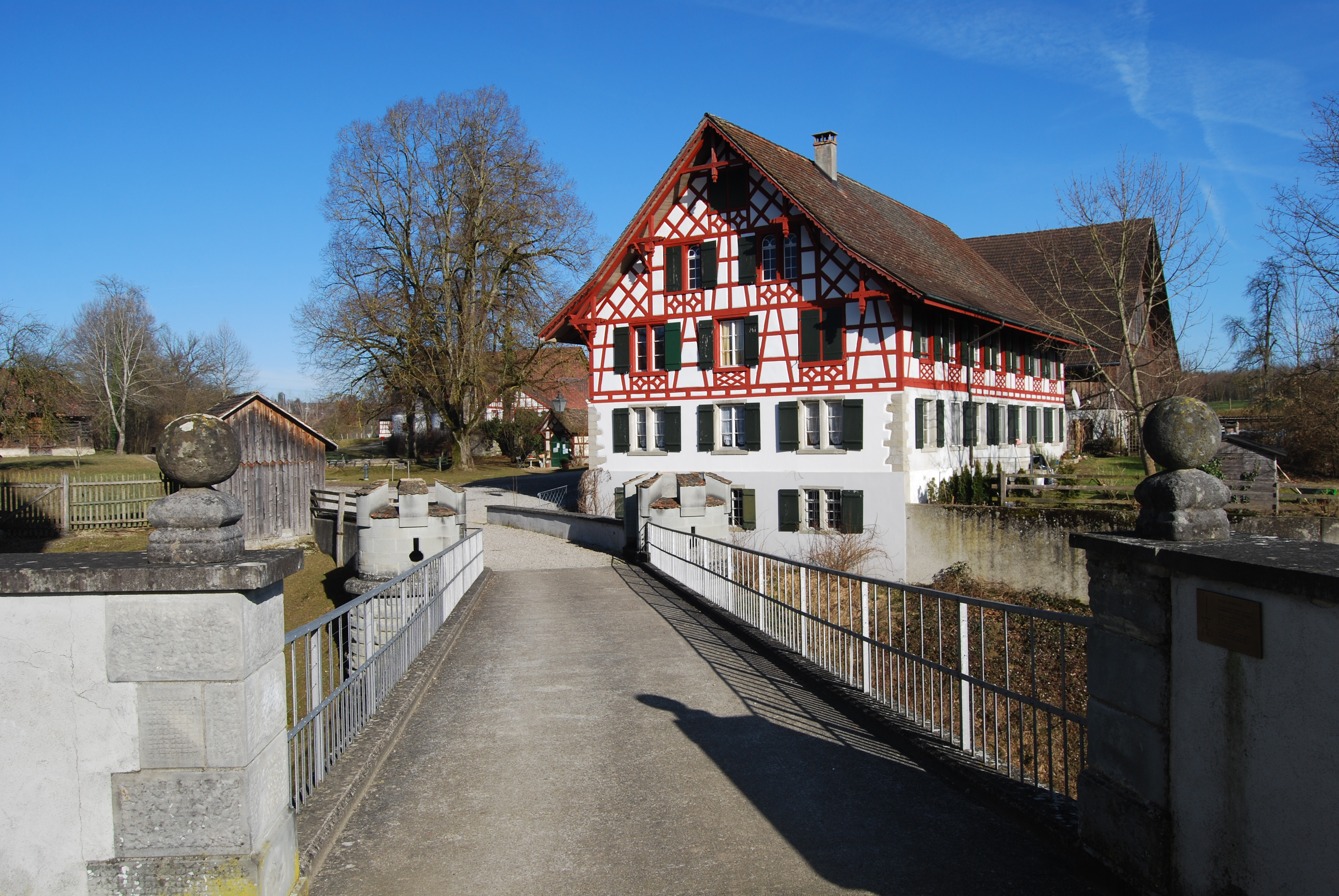
- Altenklingen

- Coat of arms
- Location of Wigoltingen
- Location within Switzerland Location within Canton of Thurgau
- Coordinates: 47°36′N 9°1′E
- Country: Switzerland
- Canton: Thurgau
- District: Weinfelden

Area
  - Total: 17.15 km^{2} (6.62 sq mi)
- Elevation: 431 m (1,414 ft)

Population (December 2007)
  - Total: 2,126
  - Density: 124.0/km^{2} (321.1/sq mi)
- Time zone: UTC+01:00 (CET)
  - Summer (DST): UTC+02:00 (CEST)
- Postal code: 8556
- SFOS number: 4951
- ISO 3166 code: CH-TG
- Surrounded by: Amlikon-Bissegg, Homburg, Hüttlingen, Kemmental, Märstetten, Müllheim, Raperswilen, Wäldi
- Website: www.wigoltingen.ch

Wigoltingen is a municipality in the district of Weinfelden in the canton of Thurgau in Switzerland.

== Geography ==
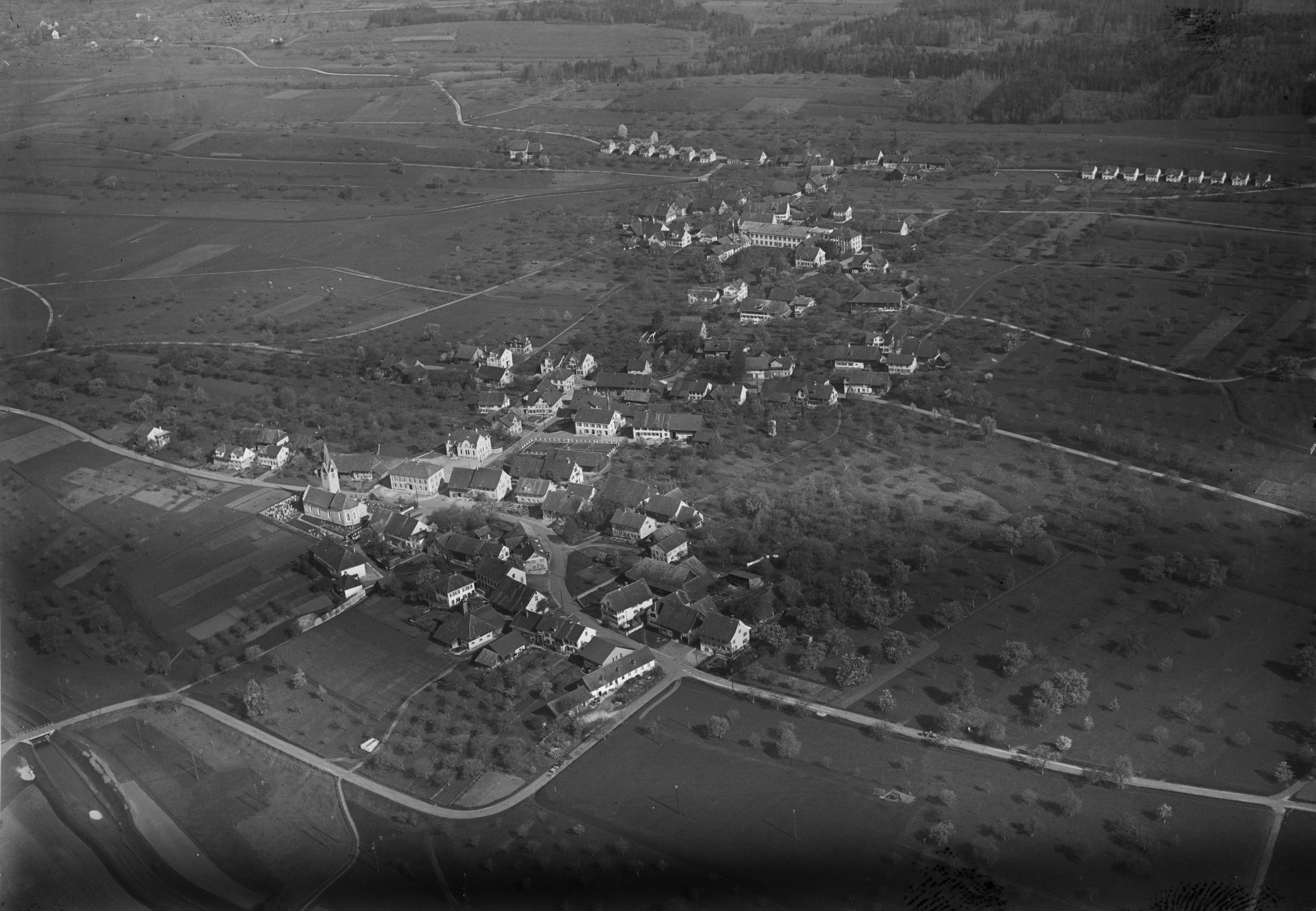
Aerial view from 400 m by Walter Mittelholzer (1924)

Wigoltingen has an area, as of 2009, of 17.15 square kilometers (6.62 sq mi). Of this area, 12.93 km^{2} (4.99 sq mi) or 75.4% is used for agricultural purposes, while 2.15 km^{2} (0.83 sq mi) or 12.5% is forested. Of the rest of the land, 1.9 km^{2} (0.73 sq mi) or 11.1% is settled (buildings or roads), 0.21 km^{2} (0.081 sq mi) or 1.2% is either rivers or lakes and 0.01 km^{2} (2.5 acres) or 0.1% is unproductive land.

Of the built up area, industrial buildings made up 4.0% of the total area while housing and buildings made up 0.4% and transportation infrastructure made up 0.5%. while parks, green belts and sports fields made up 6.2%. Out of the forested land, 11.0% of the total land area is heavily forested and 1.5% is covered with orchards or small clusters of trees. Of the agricultural land, 71.7% is used for growing crops, while 3.7% is used for orchards or vine crops. Of the water in the municipality, 0.3% is in lakes and 0.9% is in rivers and streams.

In 1995 Engwang and Illhart merged with Wigoltingen.

== Demographics ==
Wigoltingen has a population (as of December 2020) of 2,558. As of 2008, 10.6% of the population are foreign nationals. Over the last 10 years (1997–2007) the population has changed at a rate of -1.4%. Most of the population (as of 2000) speaks German (94.4%), with Italian being second most common ( 1.8%) and Portuguese being third ( 1.4%).

As of 2008, the gender distribution of the population was 50.7% male and 49.3% female. The population was made up of 934 Swiss men (44.5% of the population), and 131 (6.2%) non-Swiss men. There were 942 Swiss women (44.9%), and 92 (4.4%) non-Swiss women.

In 2008 there were 8 live births to Swiss citizens and 2 births to non-Swiss citizens, and in same time span there were 21 deaths of Swiss citizens and 2 non-Swiss citizen deaths. Ignoring immigration and emigration, the population of Swiss citizens decreased by 13 while the foreign population remained the same. There were 1 Swiss woman who emigrated from Switzerland to another country, 2 non-Swiss men who emigrated from Switzerland to another country and 4 non-Swiss women who emigrated from Switzerland to another country. The total Swiss population change in 2008 (from all sources) was a decrease of 22 and the non-Swiss population change was an increase of 10 people. This represents a population growth rate of -0.6%.

The age distribution, as of 2009, in Wigoltingen is; 195 children or 9.2% of the population are between 0 and 9 years old and 282 teenagers or 13.3% are between 10 and 19. Of the adult population, 254 people or 12.0% of the population are between 20 and 29 years old. 236 people or 11.1% are between 30 and 39, 367 people or 17.3% are between 40 and 49, and 369 people or 17.4% are between 50 and 59. The senior population distribution is 203 people or 9.6% of the population are between 60 and 69 years old, 137 people or 6.5% are between 70 and 79, there are 71 people or 3.3% who are between 80 and 89, and there are 9 people or 0.4% who are 90 and older.

As of 2000, there were 752 private households in the municipality, and an average of 2.7 persons per household. In 2000 there were 350 single family homes (or 82.4% of the total) out of a total of 425 inhabited buildings. There were 43 two family buildings (10.1%), 13 three family buildings (3.1%) and 19 multi-family buildings (or 4.5%). There were 417 (or 20.5%) persons who were part of a couple without children, and 1,305 (or 64.1%) who were part of a couple with children. There were 52 (or 2.6%) people who lived in single parent home, while there are 14 persons who were adult children living with one or both parents, 10 who lived in a household made up of unrelated persons, and 36 who are either institutionalized or live in another type of collective housing.

The vacancy rate for the municipality, in 2008, was 0.47%. As of 2007, the construction rate of new housing units was 3.8 new units per 1000 residents. In 2000 there were 791 apartments in the municipality. The most common apartment size was the 6 room apartment of which there were 227. There were 20 single room apartments and 227 apartments with six or more rooms. As of 2000 the average price to rent an average apartment in Wigoltingen was 1053.12 Swiss francs (CHF) per month (US$840, £470, €670 approx. exchange rate from 2000). The average rate for a one-room apartment was 600.80 CHF (US$480, £270, €380), a two-room apartment was about 891.06 CHF (US$710, £400, €570), a three-room apartment was about 870.59 CHF (US$700, £390, €560) and a six or more room apartment cost an average of 1469.60 CHF (US$1180, £660, €940). The average apartment price in Wigoltingen was 94.4% of the national average of 1116 CHF.

In the 2007 federal election the most popular party was the SVP which received 42.64% of the vote. The next three most popular parties were the FDP (22.52%), the CVP (10.4%) and the Green Party (8.94%). In the federal election, a total of 769 votes were cast, and the voter turnout was 51.3%.

The historical population is given in the following table:

year	population
1950	1,694
1960	1,741
1980	1,645
1990	1,868
2000	2,036

== Heritage sites of national significance ==
The Altenklingen Castle is listed as Swiss a heritage site of national significance. The hamlet of Engwang and Altenklingen Castle are both part of the Inventory of Swiss Heritage Sites.

== Gallery ==
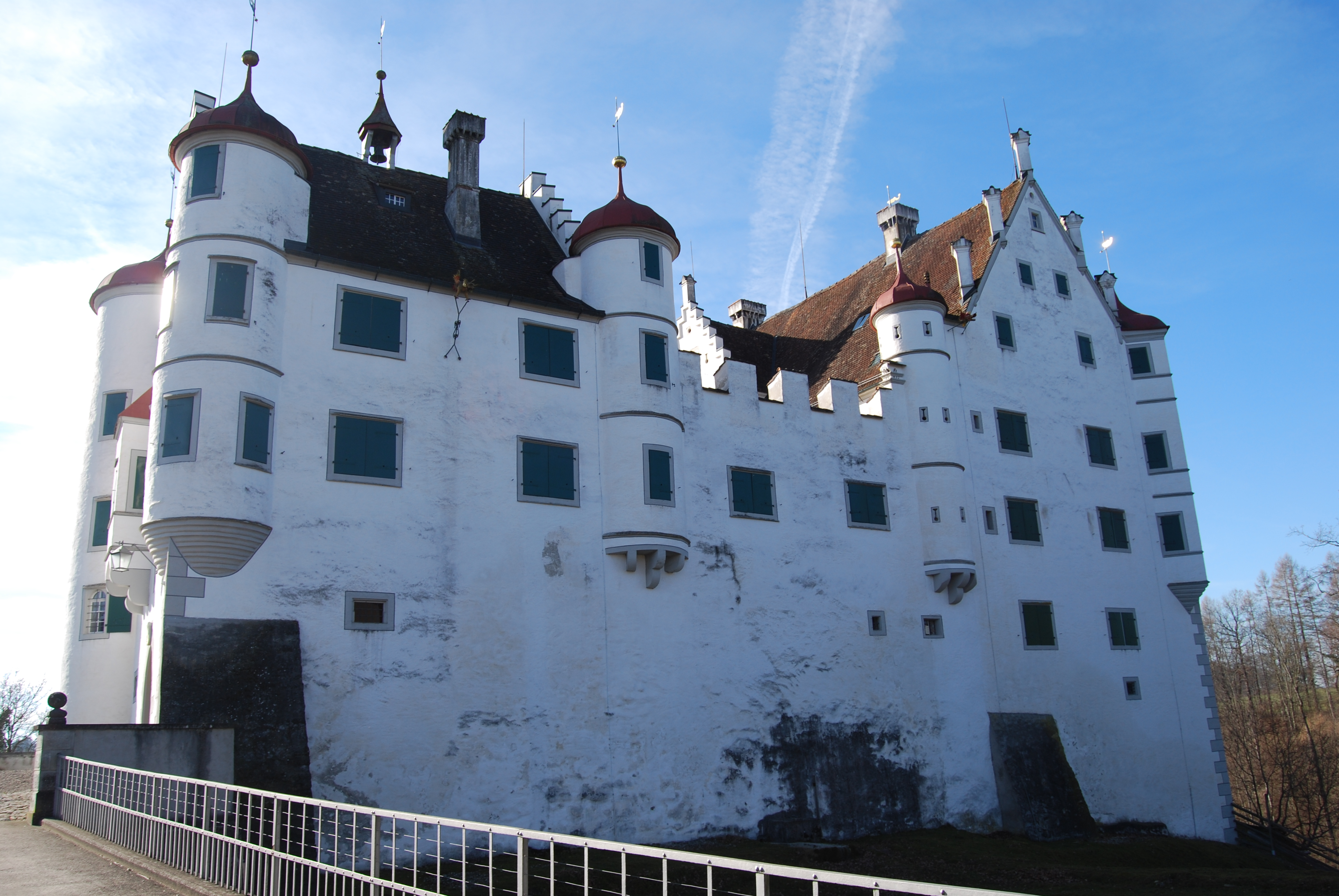
Altklingen Castle

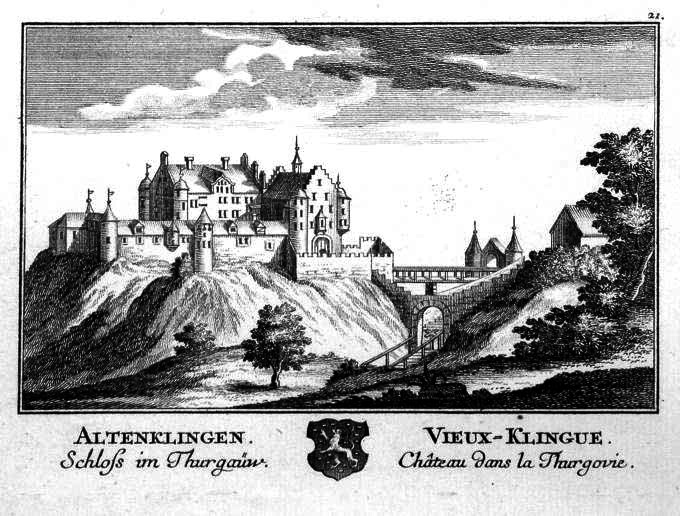
Altklingen Castle in 1754

== Economy ==
As of 2007, Wigoltingen had an unemployment rate of 1.43%. As of 2005, there were 202 people employed in the primary economic sector and about 74 businesses involved in this sector. 365 people are employed in the secondary sector and there are 26 businesses in this sector. 257 people are employed in the tertiary sector, with 46 businesses in this sector. In 2000 there were 1,418 workers who lived in the municipality. Of these, 650 or about 45.8% of the residents worked outside Wigoltingen while 337 people commuted into the municipality for work. There were a total of 1,105 jobs (of at least 6 hours per week) in the municipality. Of the working population, 7.3% used public transportation to get to work, and 47.3% used a private car.

== Religion ==
From the 2000 census, 506 or 24.9% were Roman Catholic, while 1,190 or 58.4% belonged to the Swiss Reformed Church. Of the rest of the population, there was 1 Old Catholic who belonged to the Christian Catholic Church of Switzerland there are 10 individuals (or about 0.49% of the population) who belong to the Orthodox Church, and there are 98 individuals (or about 4.81% of the population) who belong to another Christian church. There were 25 (or about 1.23% of the population) who are Islamic. There are 9 individuals (or about 0.44% of the population) who belong to another church (not listed on the census), 133 (or about 6.53% of the population) belong to no church, are agnostic or atheist, and 64 individuals (or about 3.14% of the population) did not answer the question.

== Education ==
In Wigoltingen about 74.4% of the population (between age 25-64) have completed either non-mandatory upper secondary education or additional higher education (either university or a Fachhochschule).

Wigoltingen is home to the Wigoltingen primary and secondary school district. In the 2008/2009 school year there were 343 students at either the primary or secondary levels. There were 61 children in the kindergarten, and the average class size was 20.33 kindergartners. Of the children in kindergarten, 20 or 32.8% were female, 9 or 14.8% were not Swiss citizens and 7 or 11.5% did not speak German natively. The lower and upper primary levels begin at about age 5-6 and last for 6 years. There were 100 children in who were at the lower primary level and 115 children in the upper primary level. The average class size in the primary school was 19.55 students. At the lower primary level, there were 51 children or 51.0% of the total population who were female, 7 or 7.0% were not Swiss citizens and 10 or 10.0% did not speak German natively. In the upper primary level, there were 45 or 39.1% who were female, 8 or 7.0% were not Swiss citizens and 6 or 5.2% did not speak German natively. At the secondary level, students are divided according to performance.

The secondary level begins at about age 12 and usually lasts 3 years. There were 64 teenagers who were in the advanced school, of which 36 or 56.3% were female, 2 or 3.1% were not Swiss citizens. There were 64 teenagers who were in the standard school, of which 32 or 50.0% were female, 6 or 9.4% were not Swiss citizens and 5 or 7.8% did not speak German natively. The average class size for all classes at the secondary level was 21.33 students.

== Transport ==
Müllheim-Wigoltingen railway station is a stop of the Zürich S-Bahn services S8 and S30.
