= Müllheim, Switzerland =

Müllheim
- Municipality
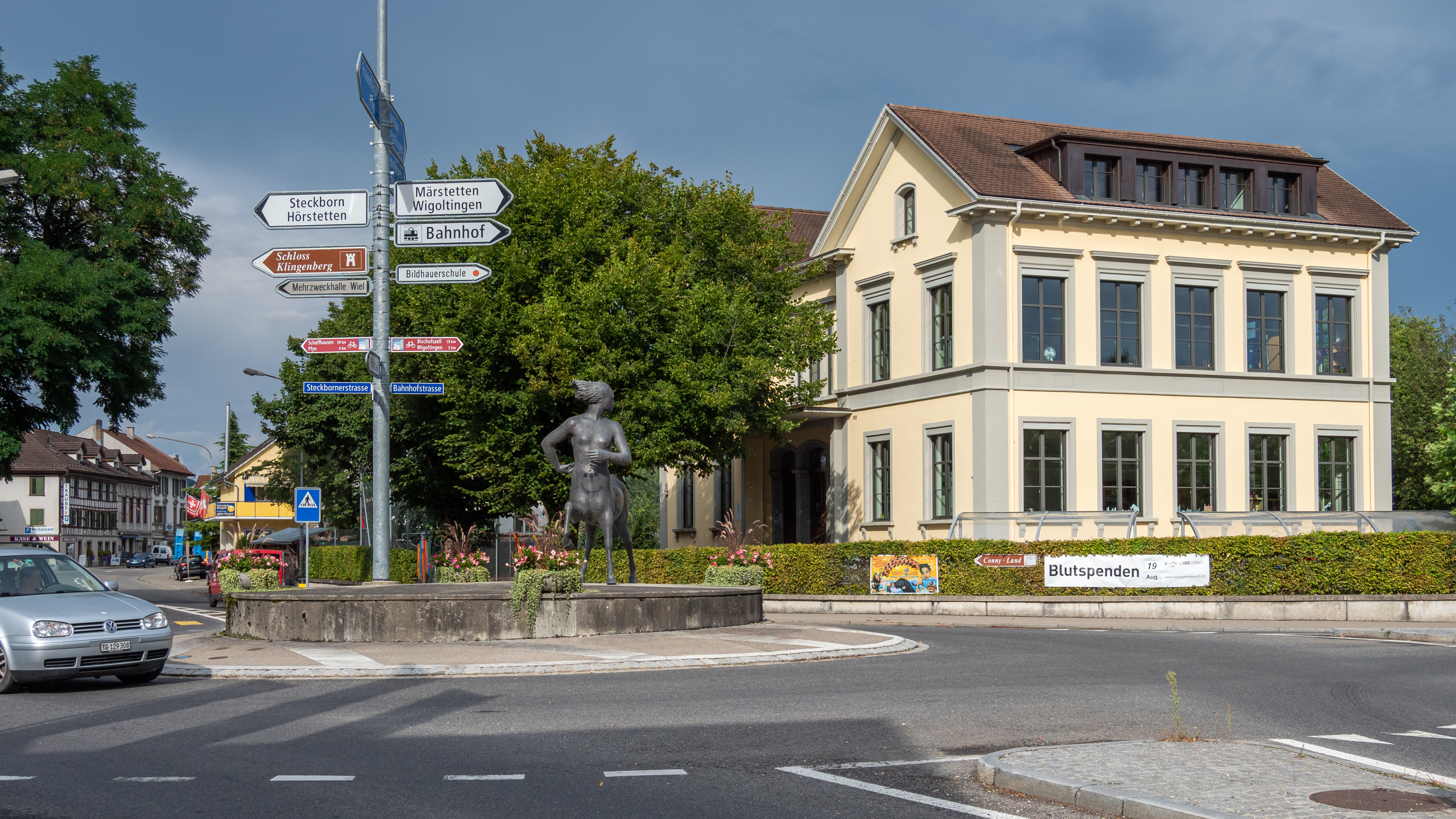

- Coat of arms
- Location of Müllheim
- Location within Switzerland Location within Canton of Thurgau
- Coordinates: 47°36′N 9°0′E
- Country: Switzerland
- Canton: Thurgau
- District: Frauenfeld

Area
  - Total: 8.73 km^{2} (3.37 sq mi)
- Elevation: 413 m (1,355 ft)

Population (January 2011)
  - Total: 2,676
  - Density: 307/km^{2} (794/sq mi)
- Time zone: UTC+01:00 (CET)
  - Summer (DST): UTC+02:00 (CEST)
- Postal code: 8555
- SFOS number: 4831
- ISO 3166 code: CH-TG
- Surrounded by: Amlikon-Bissegg, Homburg, Hüttlingen, Pfyn, Wigoltingen
- Website: muellheim.ch

Müllheim (German pronunciation: [ˈmʏlhaɪm]) is a municipality in Frauenfeld District in the canton of Thurgau in Switzerland.

== History ==
Müllheim is first mentioned in 1254 as Mulhain. In the 13th and 14th Centuries the Ministerialis (unfree knights in the service of a feudal overlord) family of Müllheim was mentioned. Initially the Counts of Kyburg owned the bailiwick of Müllheim. When that line died out, the Habsburgs took over. Reichenau Abbey bought the rights over the village in 1460. The abbey and its successors (between 1540 and 1798 the Bishop of Constance) were the judicial rulers and landlords of the village. The municipality had the right to impose fines and light corporal punishment

Aerial view (1968)

The village church was probably first built, as part of Pfyn parish, around 1340. It belonged to the Langenhart parish (now a hamlet within northeast Müllheim) until 1483 and then to Hüttlingen. In 1528 the Protestant Reformation entered the village and many of the villagers converted. In 1540 the rights to appoint the village priest went to the Bishop of Constance. In 1804 those rights went to the Canton Thurgau, and in 1830 to the local parish. In 1607 the Catholic Mass was once again allowed in the village. The church of St. Verena was then used by both denominations, until the construction of the Catholic Church in 1967. In the course of the 20th Century, the portion of the inhabitants who follow the Swiss Reformed Church has increased. By the turn of the 21st Century it was about half of the population.

The economy of Müllheim was characterized by wine, fruit, flax and hemp production as well as forestry and dairy farming and cheese making. The municipality had several handicraft businesses and restaurants, as well as two annual fairs. The train station Müllheim-Wigoltingen opened in 1855. This train station encouraged the construction in 1857 of a canvas factory in Grüneck. In 1979 this became the weaving factory of Grüneta AG, which went bankrupt in 2004. The Utilis Müllheim tool factory was founded in 1870 and employed 40 staff in 2000. Other businesses in the municipality included an embroidery factory in 1900, a wood turning plant that was open between 1909–16 and a machine shop from 1906 to 1909. Since 1954, a local company manufactures steel furniture, another has recycled industrial waste since 1991.

== Geography ==
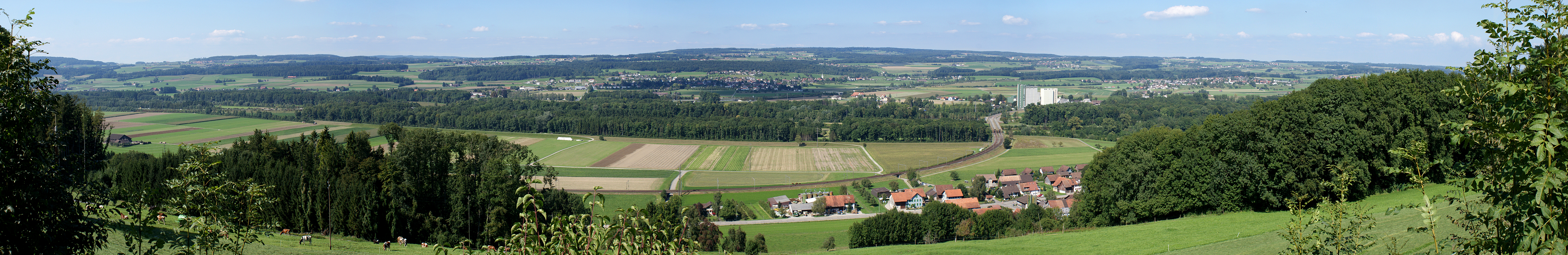
Thur valley with Seerücken hills. Müllheim is in the middle of the picture.

Müllheim has an area, as of 2017, of 8.74 square kilometers (3.37 sq mi). Of this area, 4.35 km^{2} (1.68 sq mi) or 49.8% is used for agricultural purposes, while 2.56 km^{2} (0.99 sq mi) or 29.3% is forested. Of the rest of the land, 1.64 km^{2} (0.63 sq mi) or 18.8% is settled (buildings or roads), 0.18 km^{2} (0.069 sq mi) or 2.1% is either rivers or lakes.

Of the built up area, industrial buildings made up 1.6% of the total area while housing and buildings made up 8.8% and transportation infrastructure made up 7.1%. Power and water infrastructure as well as other special developed areas made up 0.7% of the area, while parks, green belts and sports fields made up 0.6%. Out of the forested land, 27.9% of the total land area is heavily forested and 1.4% is covered with orchards or small clusters of trees. Of the agricultural land, 34.3% is used for growing crops and 12.6% is pastures, while 2.9% is used for orchards or vine crops. All the water in the municipality is flowing water.

The municipality is located in Frauenfeld District, on the southern edge of the Seerücken hills. It consists of the village of Müllheim and the hamlets of Maltbach, Grüneck and Langenhart.

== Demographics ==
Müllheim has a population (as of December 2020) of 3,002 As of 2008, 13.5% of the population are foreign nationals. Over the last 10 years (1997–2007) the population has changed at a rate of 11%. Most of the population (as of 2000) speaks German(89.3%), with Albanian being second most common ( 3.0%) and Italian being third ( 2.5%).

As of 2008, the gender distribution of the population was 50.0% male and 50.0% female. The population was made up of 1,107 Swiss men (43.0% of the population), and 181 (7.0%) non-Swiss men. There were 1,123 Swiss women (43.6%), and 166 (6.4%) non-Swiss women. In 2008 there were 21 live births to Swiss citizens and 4 births to non-Swiss citizens, and in same time span there were 11 deaths of Swiss citizens and 2 non-Swiss citizen deaths. Ignoring immigration and emigration, the population of Swiss citizens increased by 10 while the foreign population increased by 2. There was 1 Swiss man, 2 Swiss women who emigrated from Switzerland to another country, 6 non-Swiss men who emigrated from Switzerland to another country and 14 non-Swiss women who emigrated from Switzerland to another country. The total Swiss population change in 2008 (from all sources) was an increase of 41 and the non-Swiss population change was an increase of 35 people. This represents a population growth rate of 3.0%.

The age distribution, as of 2009, in Müllheim is; 285 children or 10.8% of the population are between 0 and 9 years old and 387 teenagers or 14.7% are between 10 and 19. Of the adult population, 297 people or 11.3% of the population are between 20 and 29 years old. 330 people or 12.6% are between 30 and 39, 492 people or 18.7% are between 40 and 49, and 370 people or 14.1% are between 50 and 59. The senior population distribution is 242 people or 9.2% of the population are between 60 and 69 years old, 138 people or 5.2% are between 70 and 79, there are 77 people or 2.9% who are between 80 and 89, and there are 11 people or 0.4% who are 90 and older.

As of 2000, there were 906 private households in the municipality, and an average of 2.6 persons per household. In 2000 there were 371 single family homes (or 79.1% of the total) out of a total of 469 inhabited buildings. There were 56 two family buildings (11.9%), 9 three family buildings (1.9%) and 33 multi-family buildings (or 7.0%). There were 497 (or 20.7%) persons who were part of a couple without children, and 1,458 (or 60.8%) who were part of a couple with children. There were 126 (or 5.3%) people who lived in single parent home, while there are 8 persons who were adult children living with one or both parents, 12 persons who lived in a household made up of relatives, 14 who lived in a household made up of unrelated persons, and 32 who are either institutionalized or live in another type of collective housing. The vacancy rate for the municipality, in 2008, was 2.54%. As of 2007, the construction rate of new housing units was 3.6 new units per 1000 residents.

In 2000 there were 955 apartments in the municipality. The most common apartment size was the 4 room apartment of which there were 280. There were 29 single room apartments and 173 apartments with six or more rooms. As of 2000 the average price to rent an average apartment in Müllheim was 1135.57 Swiss francs (CHF) per month (US$910, £510, €730 approx. exchange rate from 2000). The average rate for a one-room apartment was 507.33 CHF (US$410, £230, €320), a two-room apartment was about 759.46 CHF (US$610, £340, €490), a three-room apartment was about 960.07 CHF (US$770, £430, €610) and a six or more room apartment cost an average of 1838.64 CHF (US$1470, £830, €1180). The average apartment price in Müllheim was 101.8% of the national average of 1116 CHF.

In the 2007 federal election the most popular party was the SVP which received 44.35% of the vote. The next three most popular parties were the CVP (17.7%), the FDP (12.51%) and the SP (10.51%). In the federal election, a total of 730 votes were cast, and the voter turnout was 43.8%.

The historical population is given in the following table:

year	population
1850	873
1860	1,144
1870	904
1880	1,281
1890	1,385
1900	1,464
1950	1,541
1960	1,511
1980	1,541
1990	1,888
2000	2,398

== Sights ==
The region of Grüneck is designated as part of the Inventory of Swiss Heritage Sites.

== Economy ==
As of 2007, Müllheim had an unemployment rate of 1.63%. As of 2005, there were 75 people employed in the primary economic sector and about 29 businesses involved in this sector. 316 people are employed in the secondary sector and there are 30 businesses in this sector. 402 people are employed in the tertiary sector, with 76 businesses in this sector.

In 2000 there were 1,705 workers who lived in the municipality. Of these, 931 or about 54.6% of the residents worked outside Müllheim while 401 people commuted into the municipality for work. There were a total of 1,175 jobs (of at least 6 hours per week) in the municipality. Of the working population, 8.6% used public transportation to get to work, and 56.4% used a private car.

== Religion ==
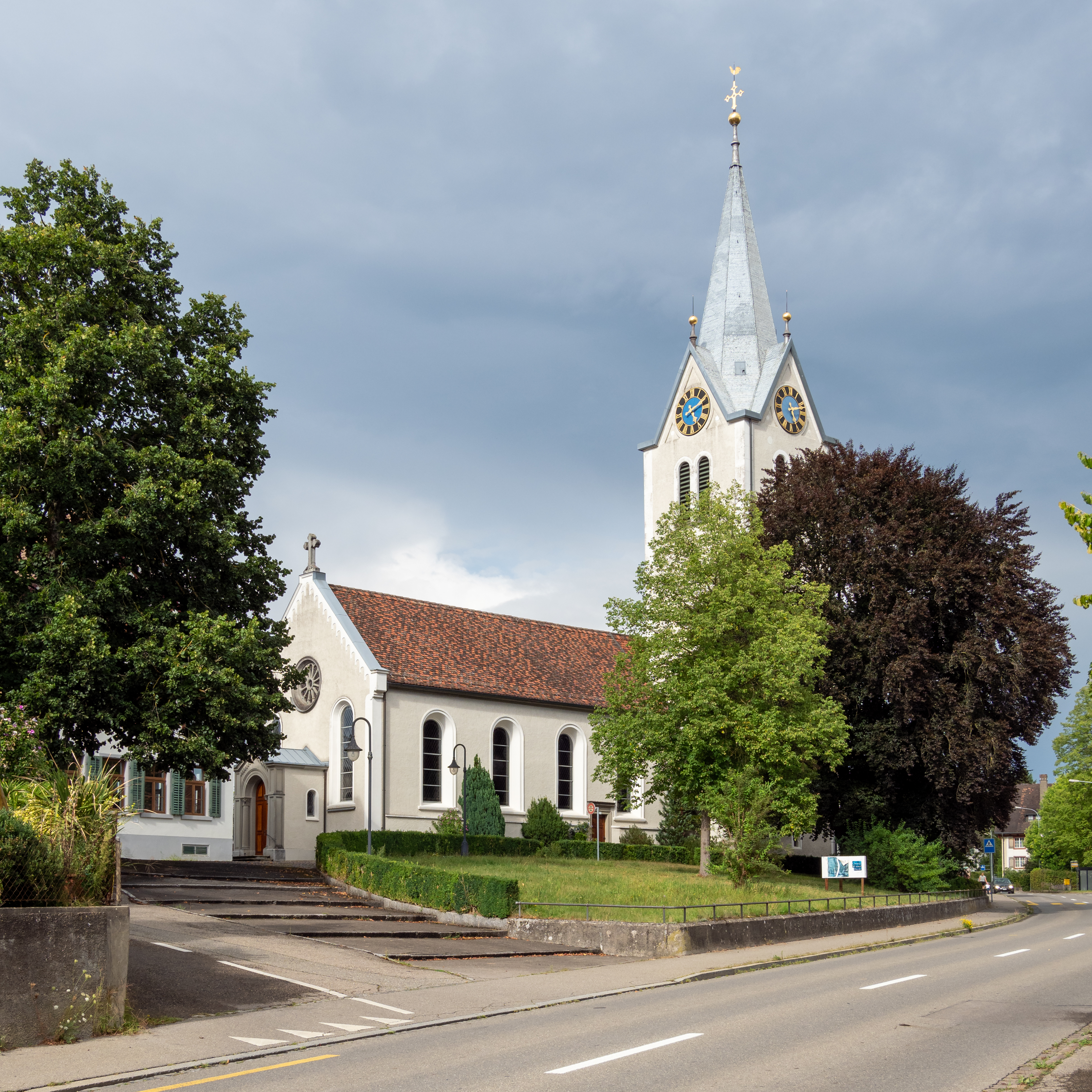
St Verena's Reformed Church in Müllheim

From the 2000 census, 709 or 29.6% were Roman Catholic, while 1,134 or 47.3% belonged to the Swiss Reformed Church. Of the rest of the population, there were 4 individuals (or about 0.17% of the population) who belonged to the Christian Catholic faith there are 34 individuals (or about 1.42% of the population) who belong to the Orthodox Church, and there are 66 individuals (or about 2.75% of the population) who belong to another Christian church. There were 2 individuals (or about 0.08% of the population) who were Jewish, and 152 (or about 6.34% of the population) who are Islamic. There are 13 individuals (or about 0.54% of the population) who belong to another church (not listed on the census), 186 (or about 7.76% of the population) belong to no church, are agnostic or atheist, and 98 individuals (or about 4.09% of the population) did not answer the question.

== Education ==
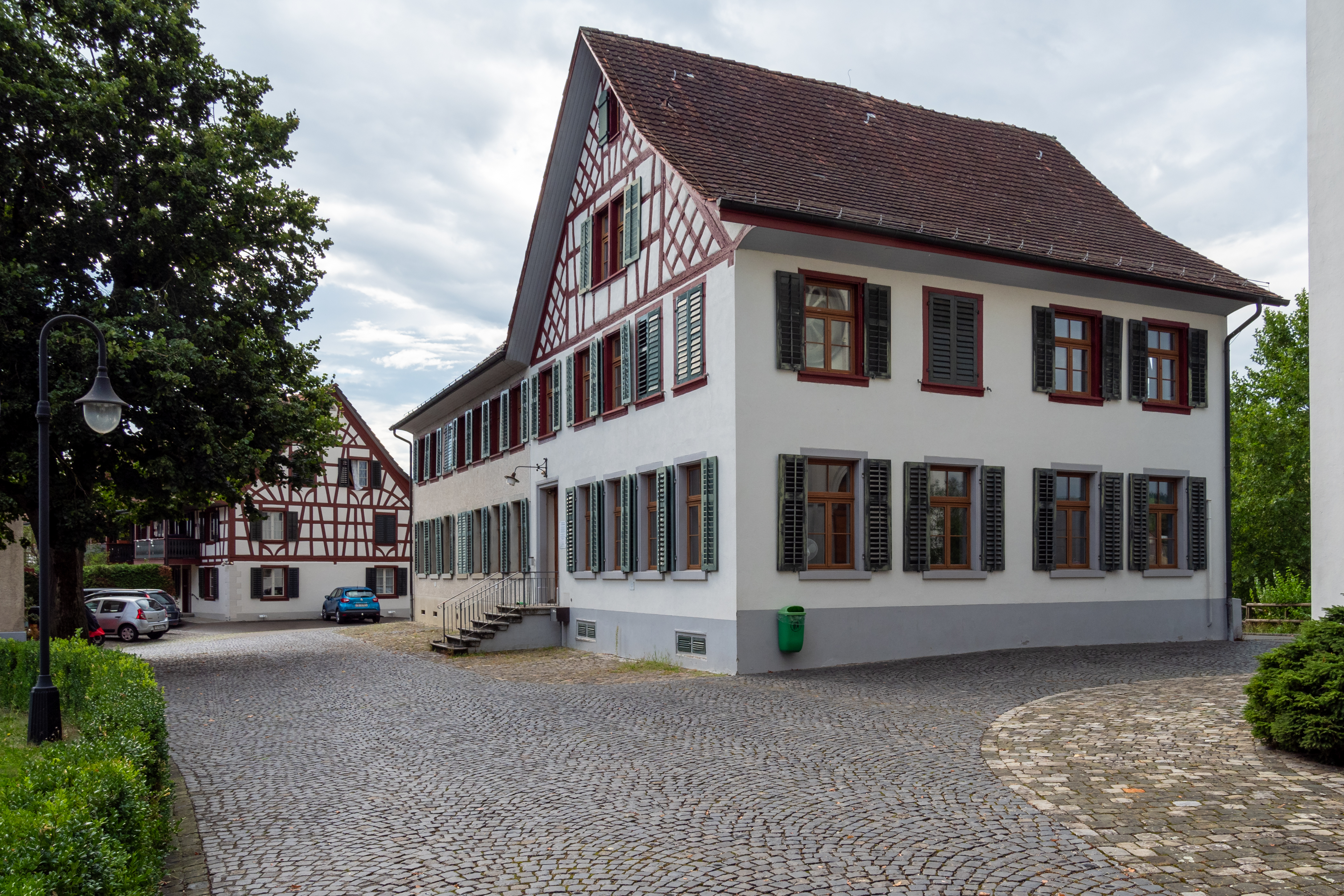
Upper schoolhouse

In Müllheim about 72% of the population (between age 25–64) have completed either non-mandatory upper secondary education or additional higher education (either university or a Fachhochschule).

Müllheim is home to the Müllheim primary school district. It is also home to the Müllheim secondary school district. In the primary school district there are 256 students. There are 55 children in the kindergarten, and the average class size is 18.33 kindergartners. Of the children in kindergarten, 26 or 47.3% are female, 9 or 16.4% are not Swiss citizens and 8 or 14.5% do not speak German natively. The lower and upper primary levels begin at about age 5-6 and lasts for 6 years. There are 101 children in who are at the lower primary level and 100 children in the upper primary level. The average class size in the primary school is 20.67 students. At the lower primary level, there are 43 children or 42.6% of the total population who are female, 16 or 15.8% are not Swiss citizens and 15 or 14.9% do not speak German natively. In the upper primary level, there are 56 or 56.0% who are female, 9 or 9.0% are not Swiss citizens and 10 or 10.0% do not speak German natively.

In the secondary school district there are 194 students. At the secondary level, students are divided according to performance. The secondary level begins at about age 12 and usually lasts 3 years. There are 111 teenagers who are in the advanced school, of which 62 or 55.9% are female, 11 or 9.9% are not Swiss citizens and 7 or 6.3% do not speak German natively. There are 74 teenagers who are in the standard school, of which 31 or 41.9% are female, 10 or 13.5% are not Swiss citizens and 10 or 13.5% do not speak German natively. Finally, there are 9 teenagers who are in special or remedial classes, of which 7 or 77.8% are female, 3 or 33.3% are not Swiss citizens and 3 or 33.3% do not speak German natively. The average class size for all classes at the secondary level is 18.5 students.

== Transport ==
Müllheim-Wigoltingen railway station is a stop of the Zürich S-Bahn services S8 and S30.
