= Seerücken =

Mountain in Switzerland

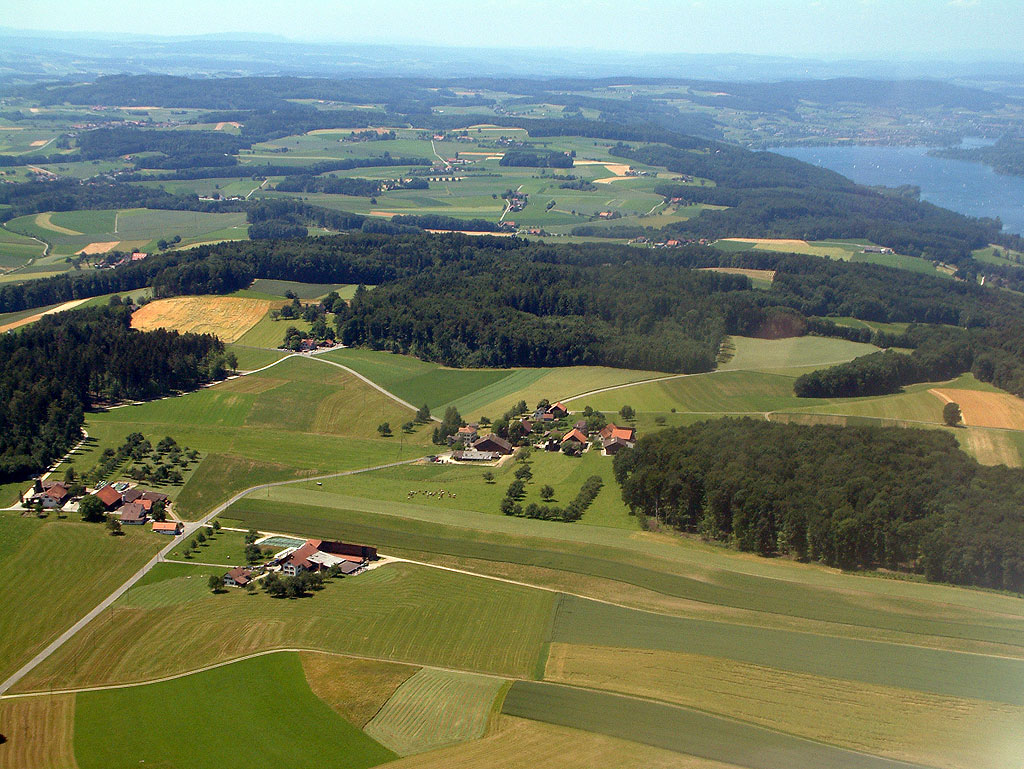
- Aerial view of the 700 metre-high plateau near the top

Highest point
- Elevation: 721 m (2,365 ft)
- Prominence: 268 m (879 ft)
- Isolation: 16.1 km (10.0 mi)
- Coordinates: 47°38′56″N 09°02′00″E

Geography
- Location within Switzerland
- Location: Thurgau, Switzerland

The Seerücken is a hill range of the northern Swiss Plateau, located in the canton of Thurgau. On its north side it overlooks the Untersee branch of Lake Constance.

The summit area of the Seerücken consists of a 700-metre-high plateau, where are the hamlets of Reutenen and Salen. The culminating point (721 m) is located at Büürer Holz, south of Reutenen.

== See also ==
- List of most isolated mountains of Switzerland
