= Matzingen railway station =

Train station in Switzerland

Matzingen
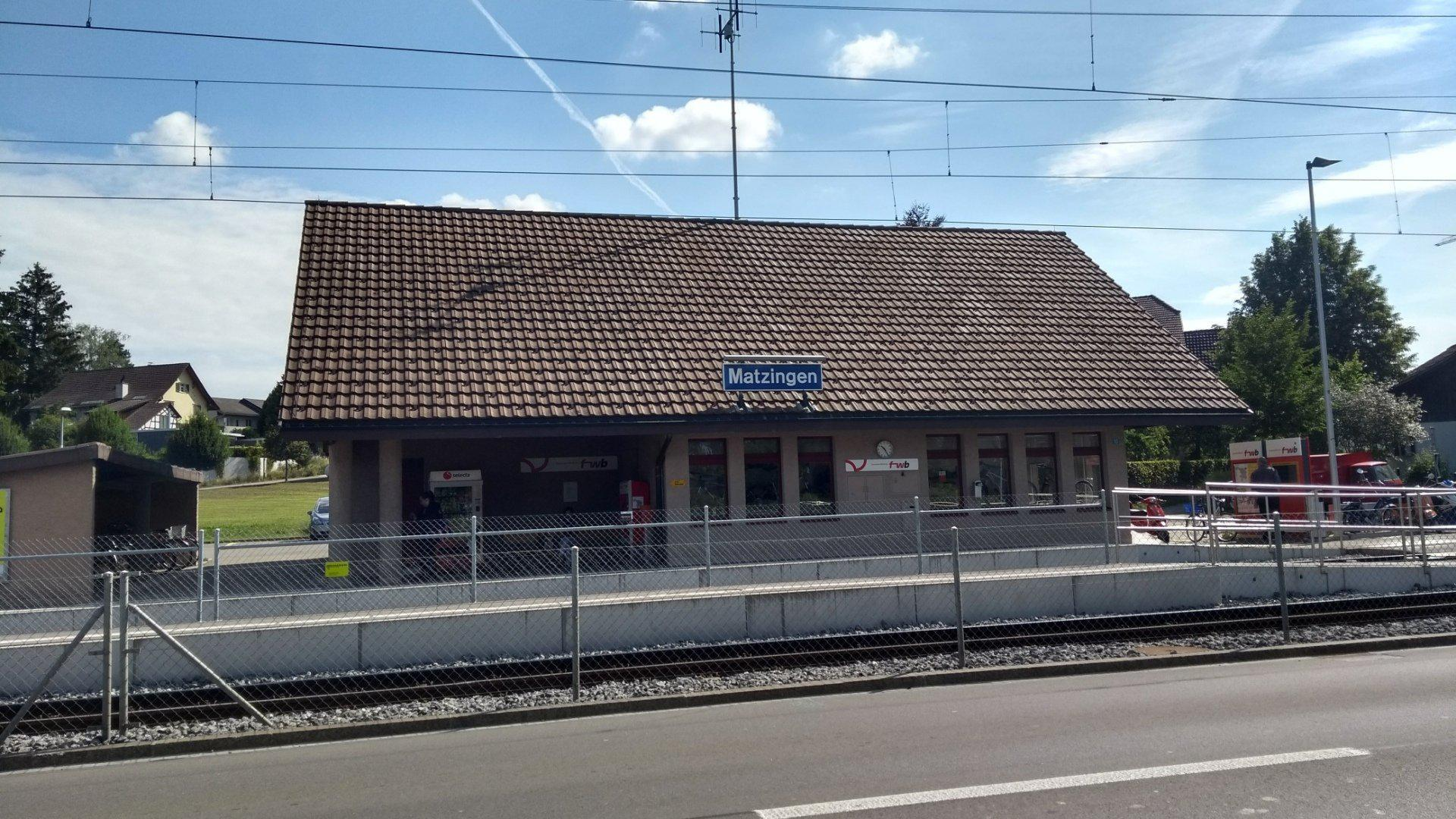
- The station building in 2018

General information
- Location: Matzingen, Thurgau; Switzerland
- Coordinates: 47°31′12″N 8°55′59″E
- Elevation: 451 m (1,480 ft)
- Owner: Appenzell Railways
- Line: Frauenfeld–Wil line
- Distance: 11.5 km (7.1 mi) from Wil
- Platforms: 1 island platform; 1 side platform
- Tracks: 2
- Train operators: Appenzell Railways

Other information
- Fare zone: 918 (Tarifverbund Ostwind)

Services
Preceding station	St. Gallen S-Bahn	Following station
Weberei Matzingen towards Frauenfeld	S15	Jakobstal towards Wil
Weberei Matzingen towards Frauenfeld	SN15 Limited service	Jakobstal towards Wil
Location
- Location within Switzerland Location within Canton of Thurgau

Matzingen railway station (German: Bahnhof Matzingen) is a railway station in the municipality of Matzingen, in the Swiss canton of Thurgau. It is located on the 1,000 mm (3 ft 3 3/8 in) Frauenfeld–Wil line of Appenzell Railways.

== Services ==
There is a digital ticket machine at the Station, offering connections from the S15 to Frauenfeld and further.

As of the December 2020 timetable change, the following services stop at Matzingen:

- St. Gallen S-Bahn S15: half-hourly service between Frauenfeld and Wil.

During weekends, the station is served by a nighttime S-Bahn services of St. Gallen S-Bahn (SN15), offered by the Ostwind tariff network:

- St. Gallen S-Bahn SN15: hourly service to Frauenfeld and to Wil.

== Regulations ==
It is asked not to smoke underneath the roof of the station, as well as not to dispose cigarettes into the trash bin.

== See also ==
- Rail transport in Switzerland
