= Weberei Matzingen railway station =

Train station in Switzerland

Weberei Matzingen
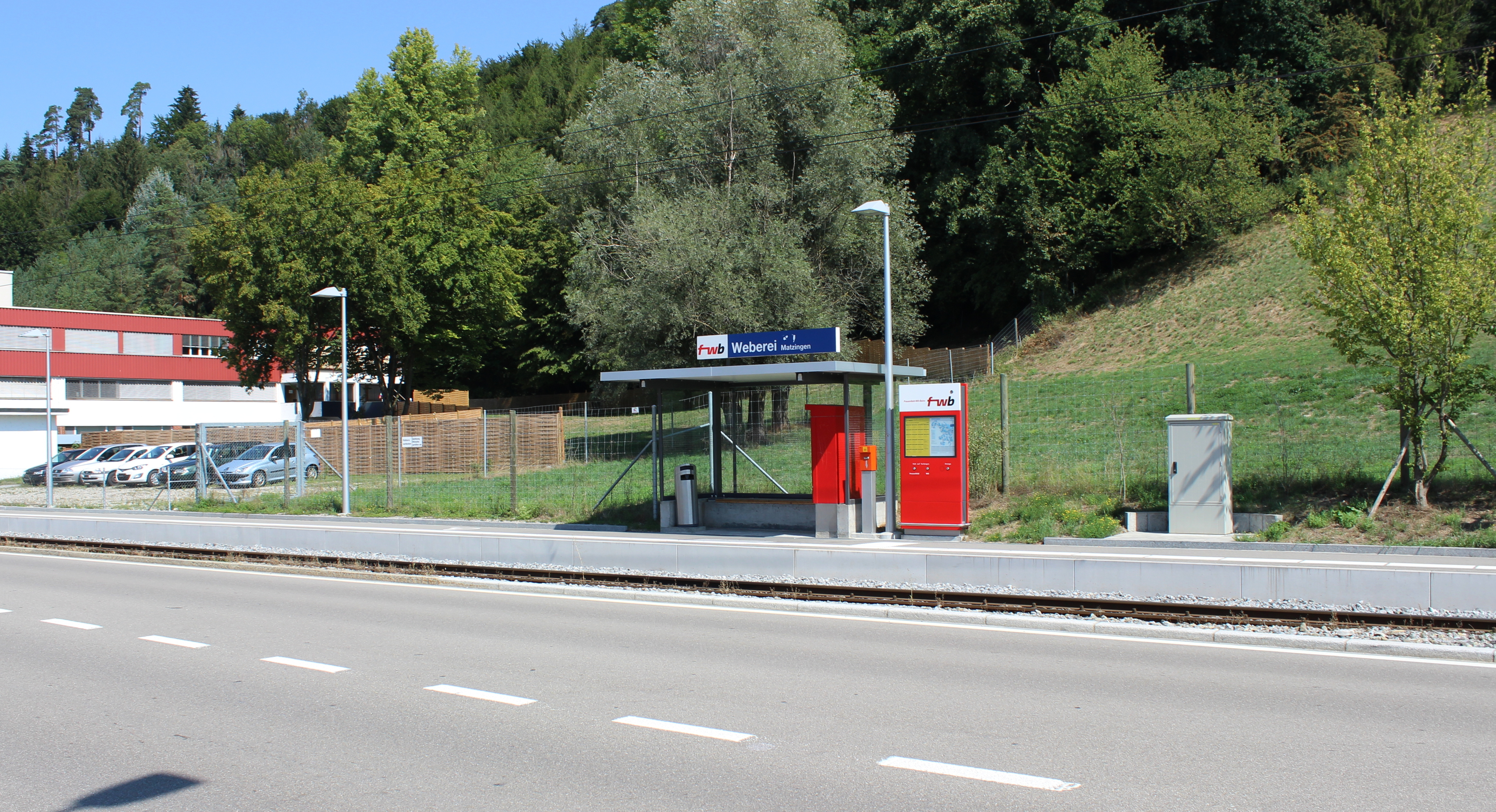
- The station in 2018

General information
- Location: Matzingen, Thurgau; Switzerland
- Coordinates: 47°31′37″N 8°55′19″E
- Elevation: 443 m (1,453 ft)
- Owner: Appenzell Railways
- Line: Frauenfeld–Wil line
- Distance: 12.6 km (7.8 mi) from Wil
- Platforms: 1 side platform
- Tracks: 1
- Train operators: Appenzell Railways

Other information
- Fare zone: 918 (Tarifverbund Ostwind)

Services
Preceding station	St. Gallen S-Bahn	Following station
Lüdem towards Frauenfeld	S15	Matzingen towards Wil
Lüdem towards Frauenfeld	SN15 Limited service	Matzingen towards Wil
Location
- Location within Switzerland Location within Canton of Thurgau

Weberei Matzingen railway station (German: Bahnhof Weberei Matzingen) is a railway station in the municipality of Matzingen, in the Swiss canton of Thurgau. It is located on the 1,000 mm (3 ft 3 3/8 in) Frauenfeld–Wil line of Appenzell Railways, and is served as a request stop by local trains only.

== Services ==
As of the December 2020 timetable change, the following services stop at Weberei Matzingen:

- St. Gallen S-Bahn S15: half-hourly service between Frauenfeld and Wil.

During weekends, the station is served by a nighttime S-Bahn services of St. Gallen S-Bahn (SN15), offered by the Ostwind tariff network:

- St. Gallen S-Bahn SN15: hourly service to Frauenfeld and to Wil.

== See also ==
- Rail transport in Switzerland
