= Rosental railway station =

Train station in Switzerland

Rosental
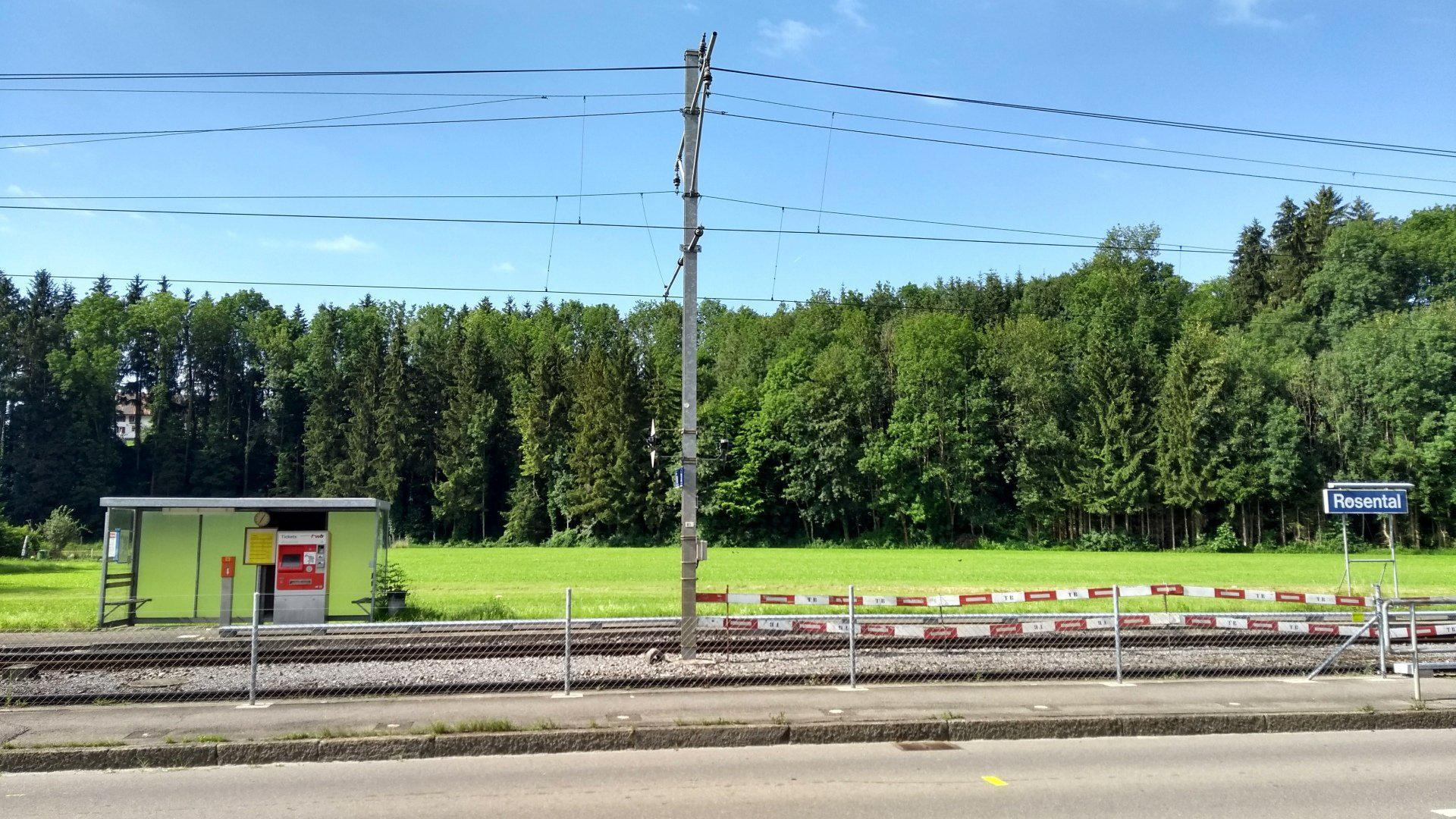
- The station in 2018

General information
- Location: Wängi, Thurgau; Switzerland
- Coordinates: 47°29′31″N 8°58′30″E
- Elevation: 487 m (1,598 ft)
- Owner: Appenzell Railways
- Line: Frauenfeld–Wil line
- Distance: 6.5 km (4.0 mi) from Wil
- Platforms: 2 side platforms
- Tracks: 2
- Train operators: Appenzell Railways

Other information
- Fare zone: 917 (Tarifverbund Ostwind)

Services
Preceding station	St. Gallen S-Bahn	Following station
Wängi towards Frauenfeld	S15	Münchwilen Pflegeheim towards Wil
Wängi towards Frauenfeld	SN15 Limited service	Münchwilen Pflegeheim towards Wil
Location
- Location within Switzerland Location within Canton of Thurgau

Rosental railway station (German: Bahnhof Rosental) is a railway station in the municipality of Wängi, in the Swiss canton of Thurgau. It is located on the 1,000 mm (3 ft 3 3/8 in) Frauenfeld–Wil line of Appenzell Railways, and is served as a request stop by local trains only.

== Services ==
As of the December 2020 timetable change, the following services stop at Rosental:

- St. Gallen S-Bahn S15: half-hourly service between Frauenfeld and Wil.

During weekends, the station is served by a nighttime S-Bahn services of St. Gallen S-Bahn (SN15), offered by the Ostwind tariff network:

- St. Gallen S-Bahn SN15: hourly service to Frauenfeld and to Wil.

== See also ==
- Rail transport in Switzerland
