= Frauenfeld Marktplatz railway station =

Train station in Switzerland

Frauenfeld Marktplatz
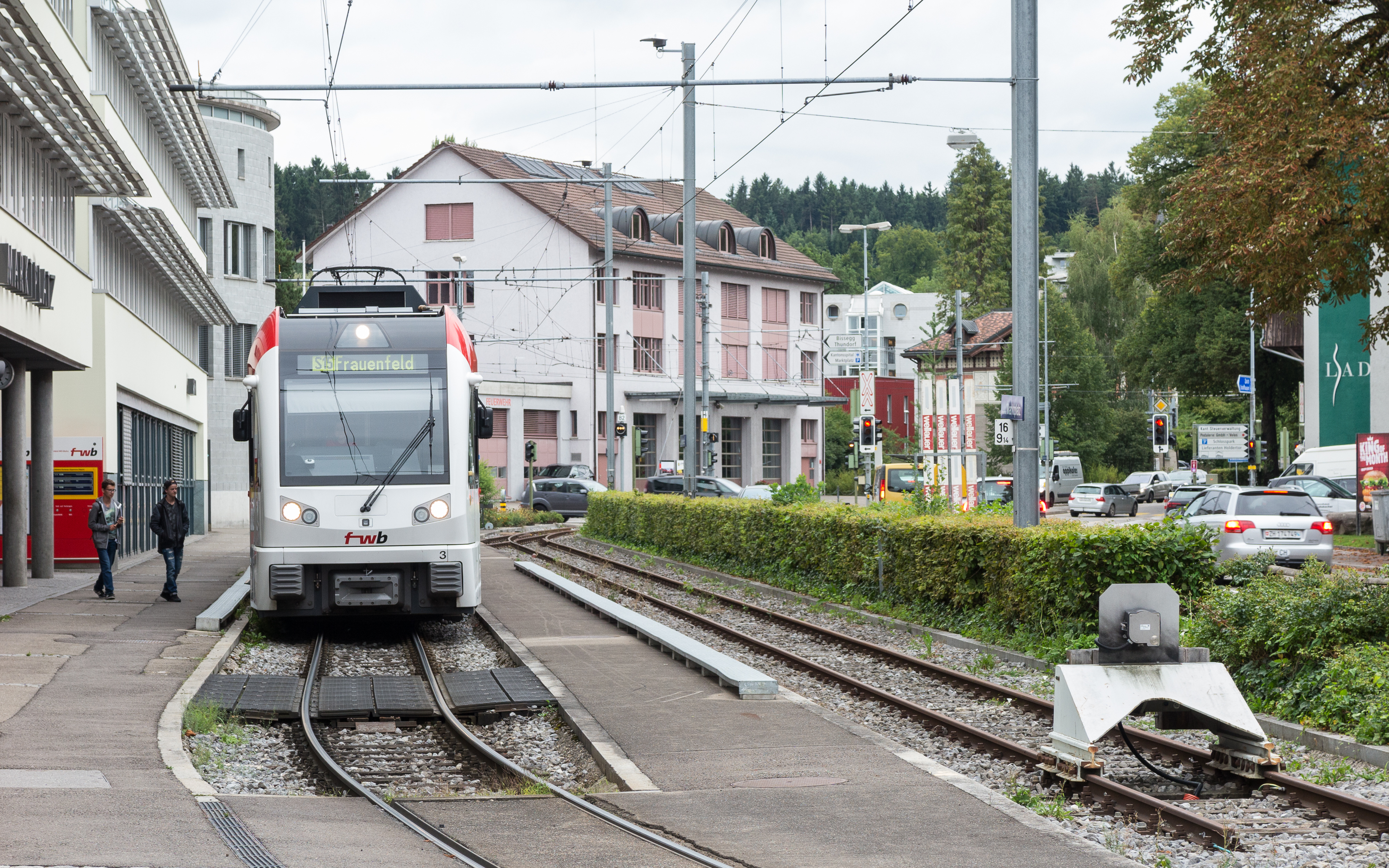
- An S15 service at the station in 2017

General information
- Location: Frauenfeld, Thurgau; Switzerland
- Coordinates: 47°33′14″N 8°53′56″E
- Elevation: 417 m (1,368 ft)
- Owner: Appenzell Railways
- Line: Frauenfeld–Wil line
- Distance: 16.9 km (10.5 mi) from Wil
- Platforms: 1 island platform; 1 side platform
- Tracks: 2
- Train operators: Appenzell Railways
- Connections: Stadtbus Frauenfeld and PostAuto buses

Other information
- Fare zone: 921 (Tarifverbund Ostwind)

History
- Former names: Frauenfeld Stadt

Services
Preceding station	St. Gallen S-Bahn	Following station
Frauenfeld Terminus	S15	Lüdem towards Wil
Frauenfeld Terminus	SN15 Limited service	Lüdem towards Wil
Location
- Location within Switzerland Location within Canton of Thurgau

Frauenfeld Marktplatz railway station (German: Bahnhof Frauenfeld Marktplatz) is a railway station in the municipality of Frauenfeld, in the Swiss canton of Thurgau. It is located on the 1,000 mm (3 ft 3 3/8 in) Frauenfeld–Wil line of Appenzell Railways.

== Services ==
As of the December 2020 timetable change, the following services stop at Frauenfeld Marktplatz:

- St. Gallen S-Bahn S15: half-hourly service between Frauenfeld and Wil.

During weekends, Frauenfeld Marktplatz station is served by a nighttime S-Bahn services of St. Gallen S-Bahn (SN15), offered by the Ostwind tariff network.

- St. Gallen S-Bahn SN15: hourly service to Frauenfeld and to Wil.

== See also ==
- Rail transport in Switzerland
