= Murg (Thur) =

River in Switzerland

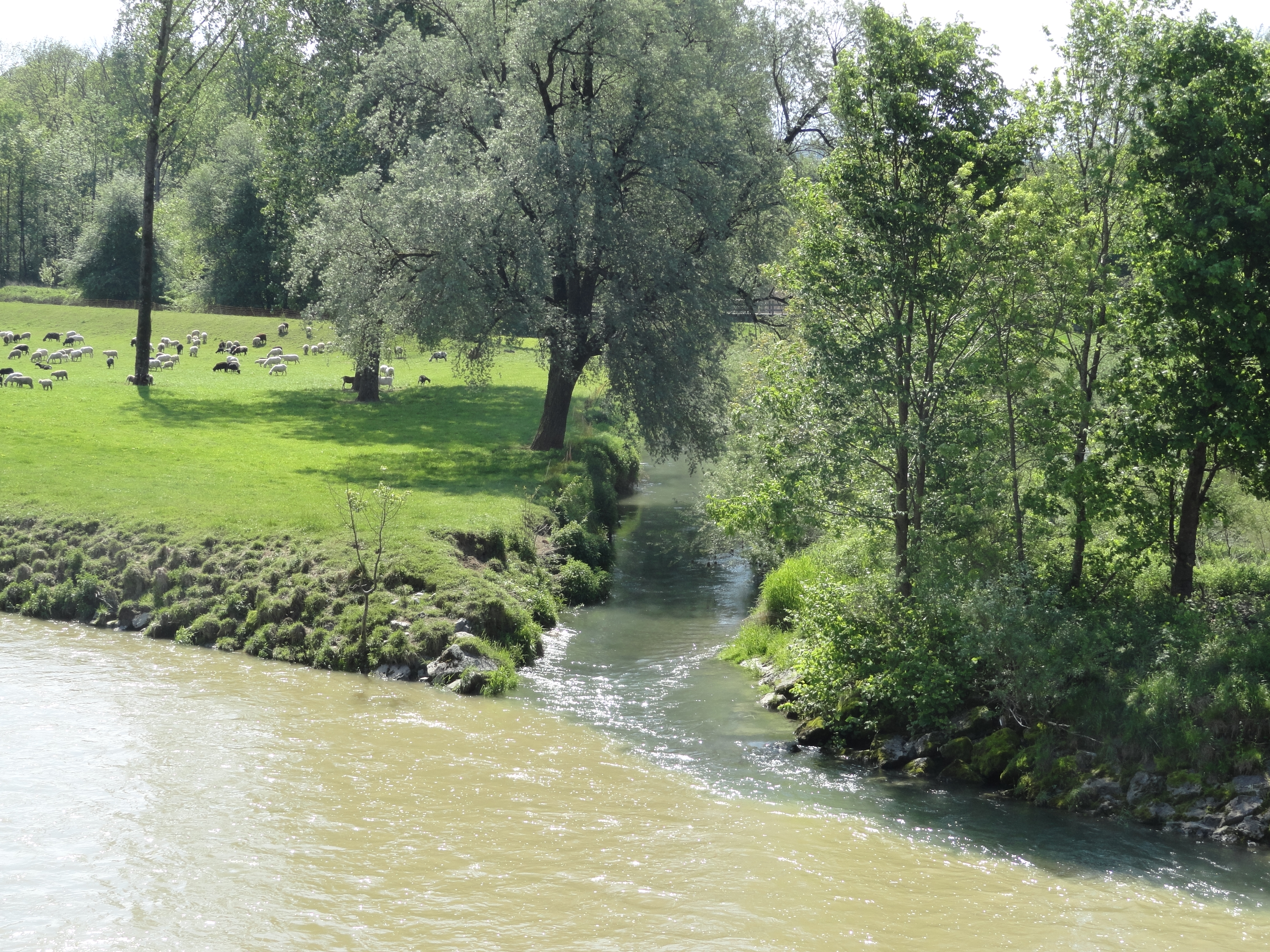
- Confluence of the Murg with the Thur

Location
- Country: Switzerland

Physical characteristics
- Source: Canton of St. Gallen
- Mouth: Thur
  - coordinates: 47.5795°N 8.8845°E
- Length: 34.1 km (21.2 mi)

Basin features
- Progression: Thur→ Rhine→ North Sea

The Murg (Swiss Standard German pronunciation: [mʊrɡ]) is a 34.1 kilometres (21.2 mi) long tributary of the Thur in Switzerland. It rises in the canton of St. Gallen, flows through the canton of Thurgau, and joins the Thur near Warth.

Along its route, the river flows through the communities of Mosnang, Fischingen, Sirnach, Münchwilen, Wängi, Stettfurt, Matzingen and Frauenfeld. Between Münchwilen and Frauenfeld the river is closely followed by the Frauenfeld–Wil railway line.

== See also ==
- List of rivers of Switzerland
