= Münchwilen railway station =

Train station in Switzerland

Münchwilen
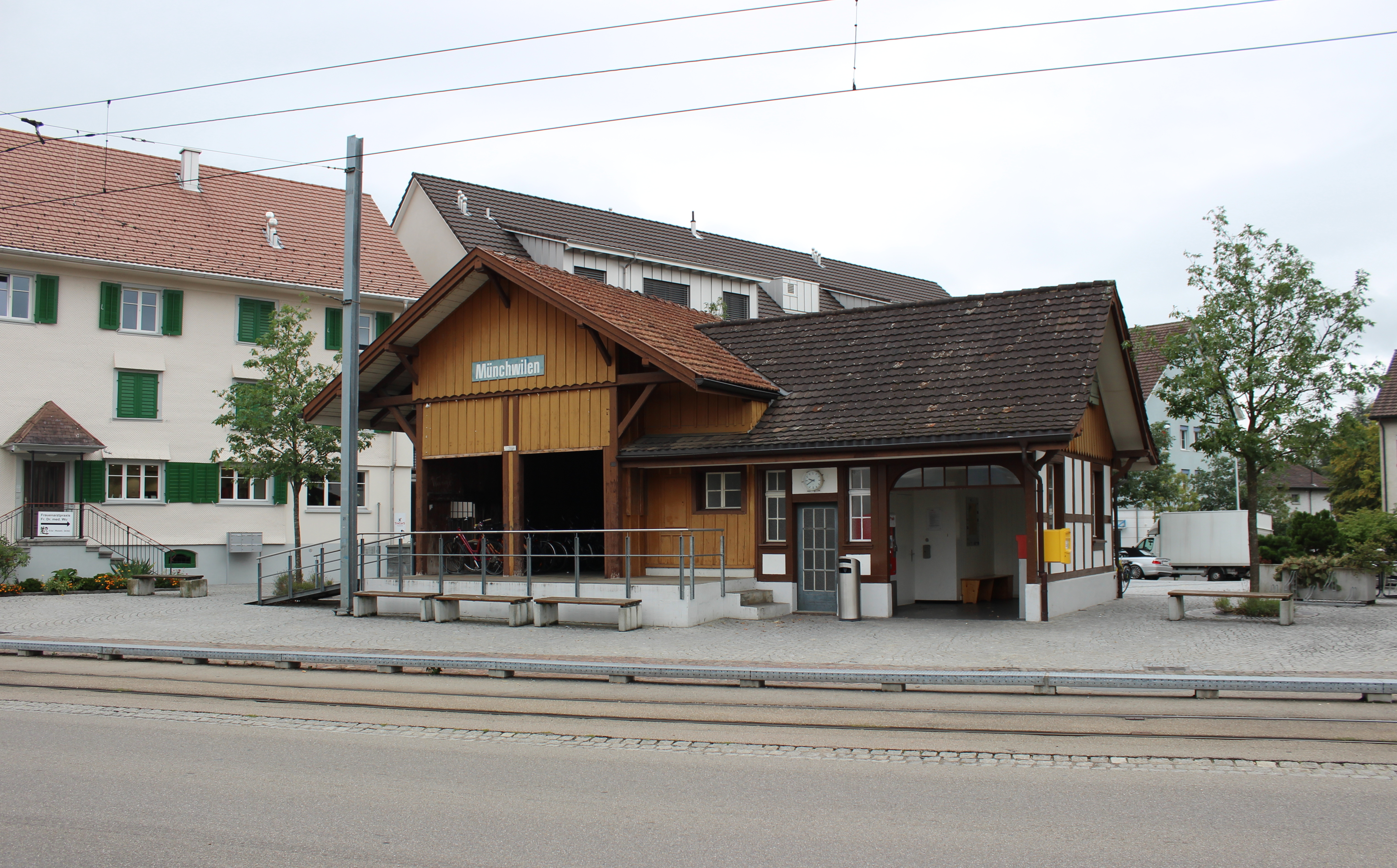
- The station in 2018

General information
- Location: Münchwilen, Thurgau; Switzerland
- Coordinates: 47°28′37″N 8°59′56″E
- Elevation: 518 m (1,699 ft)
- Owner: Appenzell Railways
- Line: Frauenfeld–Wil line
- Distance: 3.9 km (2.4 mi) from Wil
- Platforms: Street-level boarding
- Tracks: 1
- Train operators: Appenzell Railways
- Connections: PostBus buses

Other information
- Fare zone: 915 (Tarifverbund Ostwind)

Services
| Preceding station | St. Gallen S-Bahn | Following station |
|---|---|---|
| Münchwilen Pflegeheim towards Frauenfeld | S15 | Wil Terminus |
| Münchwilen Pflegeheim towards Frauenfeld | SN15 Limited service | Wil Terminus |
Location
- Location within Switzerland Location within Canton of Thurgau

Münchwilen railway station (German: Bahnhof Münchwilen), also known as Münchwilen TG, is a railway station in the municipality of Münchwilen, in the Swiss canton of Thurgau. It is located on the 1,000 mm (3 ft 3 3/8 in) Frauenfeld–Wil line of Appenzell Railways.

== Services ==
As of the December 2020 timetable change, the following services stop at Münchwilen:

- St. Gallen S-Bahn S15: half-hourly service between Frauenfeld and Wil.

During weekends, the station is served by a nighttime S-Bahn services of St. Gallen S-Bahn (SN15), offered by the Ostwind tariff network:

- St. Gallen S-Bahn SN15: hourly service to Frauenfeld and to Wil.

== See also ==
- Rail transport in Switzerland
