= Wängi railway station =

Train station in Switzerland

Wängi
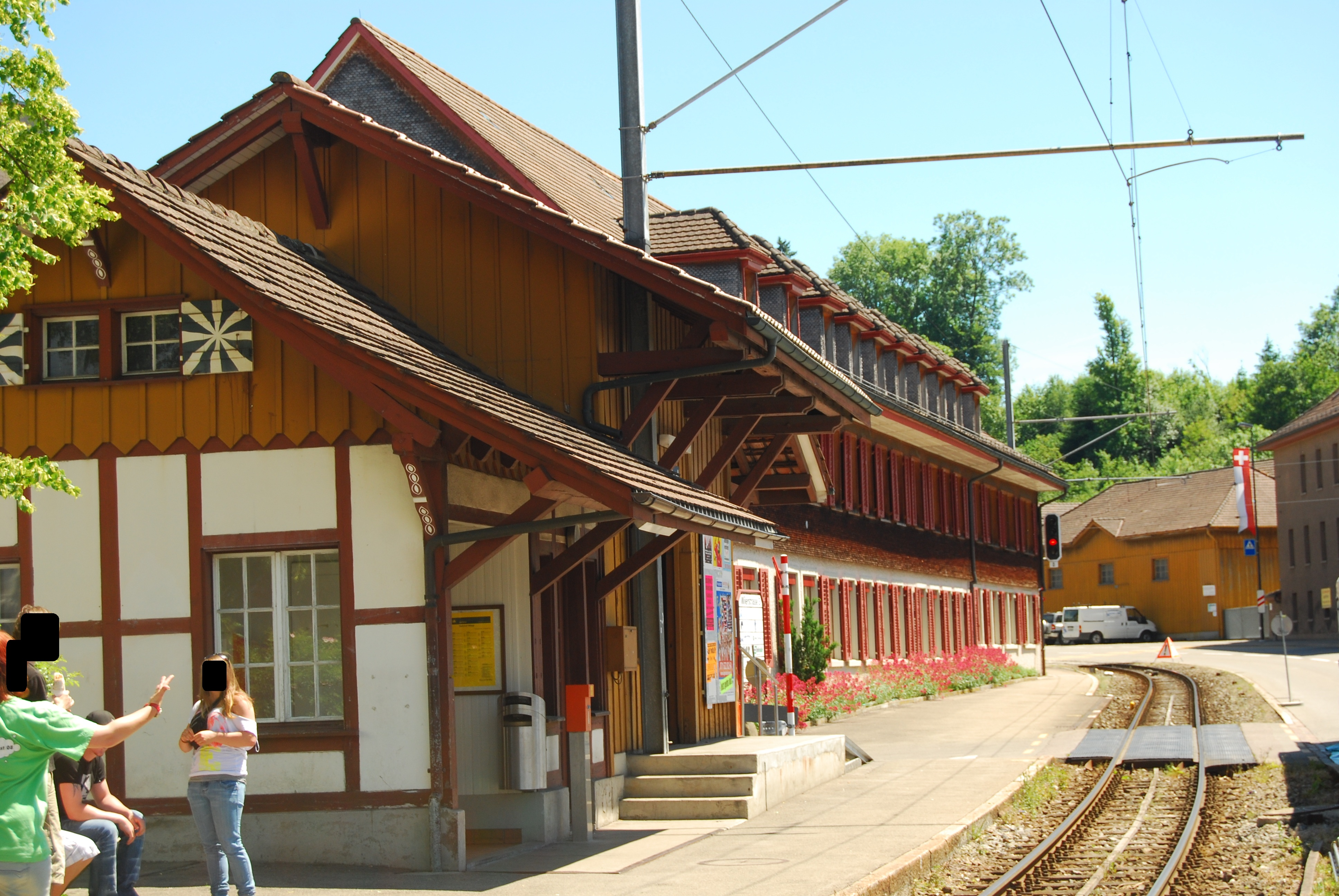
- The station building in 2011

General information
- Location: Wängi, Thurgau; Switzerland
- Coordinates: 47°29′47″N 8°57′12″E
- Elevation: 474 m (1,555 ft)
- Owner: Appenzell Railways
- Line: Frauenfeld–Wil line
- Distance: 8.3 km (5.2 mi) from Wil
- Platforms: 1 side platform
- Tracks: 1
- Train operators: Appenzell Railways

Other information
- Fare zone: 917 (Tarifverbund Ostwind)

Services
Preceding station	St. Gallen S-Bahn	Following station
Wiesengrund towards Frauenfeld	S15	Rosental towards Wil
Wiesengrund towards Frauenfeld	SN15 Limited service	Rosental towards Wil
Location
- Location within Switzerland Location within Canton of Thurgau

Wängi railway station (German: Bahnhof Wängi) is a railway station in the municipality of Wängi, in the Swiss canton of Thurgau. It is located on the 1,000 mm (3 ft 3 3/8 in) Frauenfeld–Wil line of Appenzell Railways.

== Services ==
As of the December 2020 timetable change, the following services stop at Wängi:

- St. Gallen S-Bahn S15: half-hourly service between Frauenfeld and Wil.

During weekends, the station is served by a nighttime S-Bahn services of St. Gallen S-Bahn (SN15), offered by the Ostwind tariff network:

- St. Gallen S-Bahn SN15: hourly service to Frauenfeld and to Wil.

== See also ==
- Rail transport in Switzerland
