= Matzingen =

- Municipality
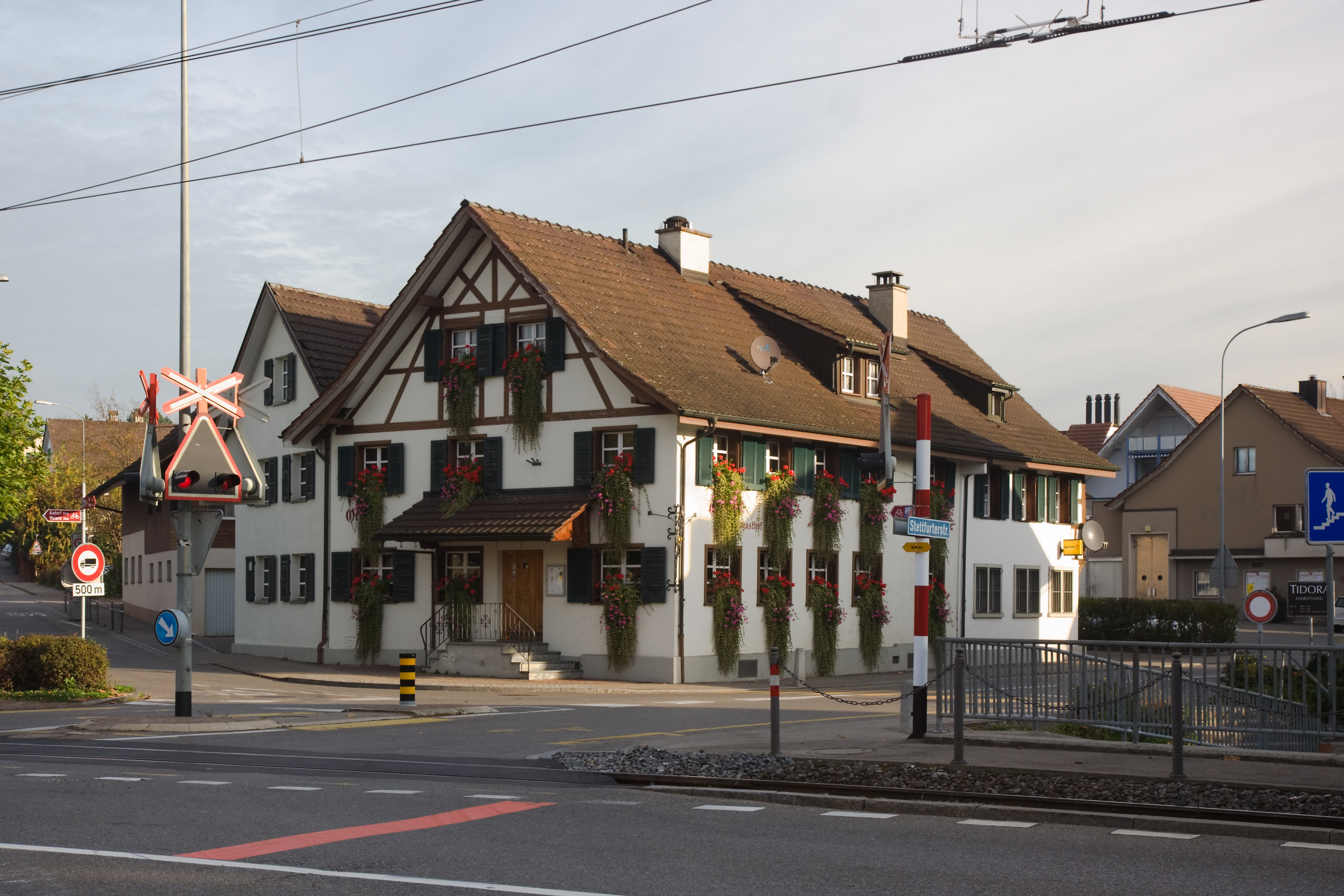
- Gasthof Ochsen in Matzingen village

- Coat of arms
- Location of Matzingen
- Location within Switzerland Location within Canton of Thurgau
- Coordinates: 47°31′N 8°56′E
- Country: Switzerland
- Canton: Thurgau
- District: Frauenfeld

Area
  - Total: 7.7 km^{2} (3.0 sq mi)
- Elevation: 450 m (1,480 ft)

Population (December 2007)
  - Total: 2,433
  - Density: 320/km^{2} (820/sq mi)
- Time zone: UTC+01:00 (CET)
  - Summer (DST): UTC+02:00 (CEST)
- Postal code: 9548
- SFOS number: 4591
- ISO 3166 code: CH-TG
- Surrounded by: Aadorf, Frauenfeld, Stettfurt, Thundorf, Wängi
- Website: www.matzingen.ch

Matzingen (Swiss German: Matzinge) is a municipality in the district of Frauenfeld in the canton of Thurgau in Switzerland.

== History ==
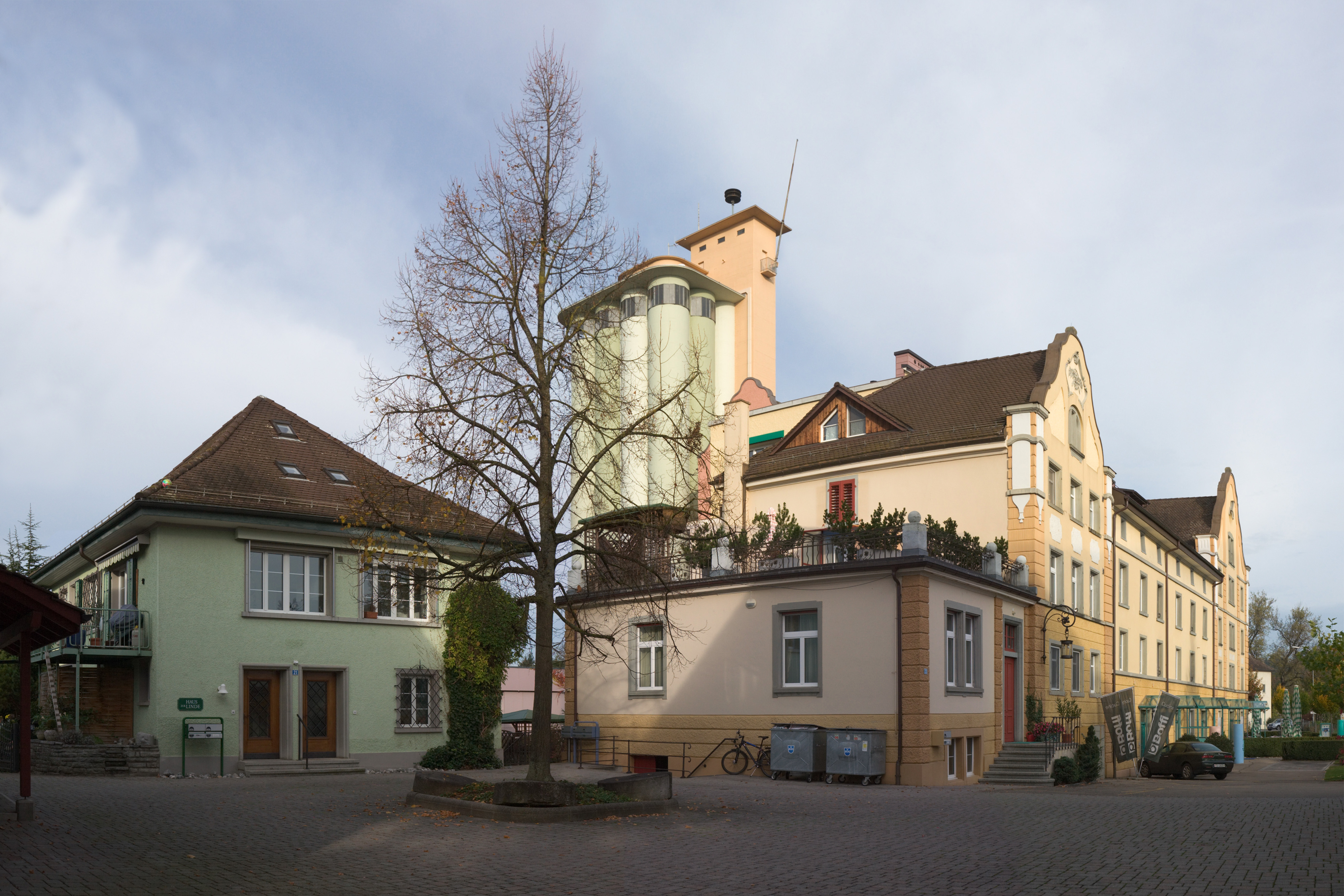
Matzingen Mill

Aerial view from 200 m by Walter Mittelholzer (1920)

Matzingen is first mentioned in 779 as Mazcingas. During the High Middle Ages, the Freiherr of Matzingen had the low court rights. Sonnenberg began to rule over the village in 1402 and remained over the village until 1798.

In 894 Matzingen had a church, which belonged to Wängi. The right to appoint the priest was first held by the Abbey of St. Gall, until 1401, when the Commandry of Tobel took over this right. Matzingen became a separate parish in 1508 and converted to the new Reformed faith in 1529.

For centuries farming, fruit production and viticulture (the latter operated until 1908) dominated the local economy. After 1850, livestock production and dairy farming were added to traditional agriculture. Between 1150 and 1996, Matzingen owned a mill. In 1863 a pottery plant opened. Followed, in 1866, by a spinning mill, which transformed in 1878 into a weaving factory. The connection to the Frauenfeld-Wil railroad in 1887 promoted the creation of new companies (including a furniture factory). In 1919, the cider mill of Matzingen opened, which produced in 1950 the drink Halb-halb (half orange juice and half cider). A workshop founded in 1948 for agricultural machinery, developed into Gehring Cut AG, which today manufactures products for the automotive and medical technology. The A1 Motorway section through Matzingen was finished in 1970. The new road allowed companies in the metal and packaging industry to settle in Matzingen. From 1965 to 2000, the population doubled.

== Geography ==
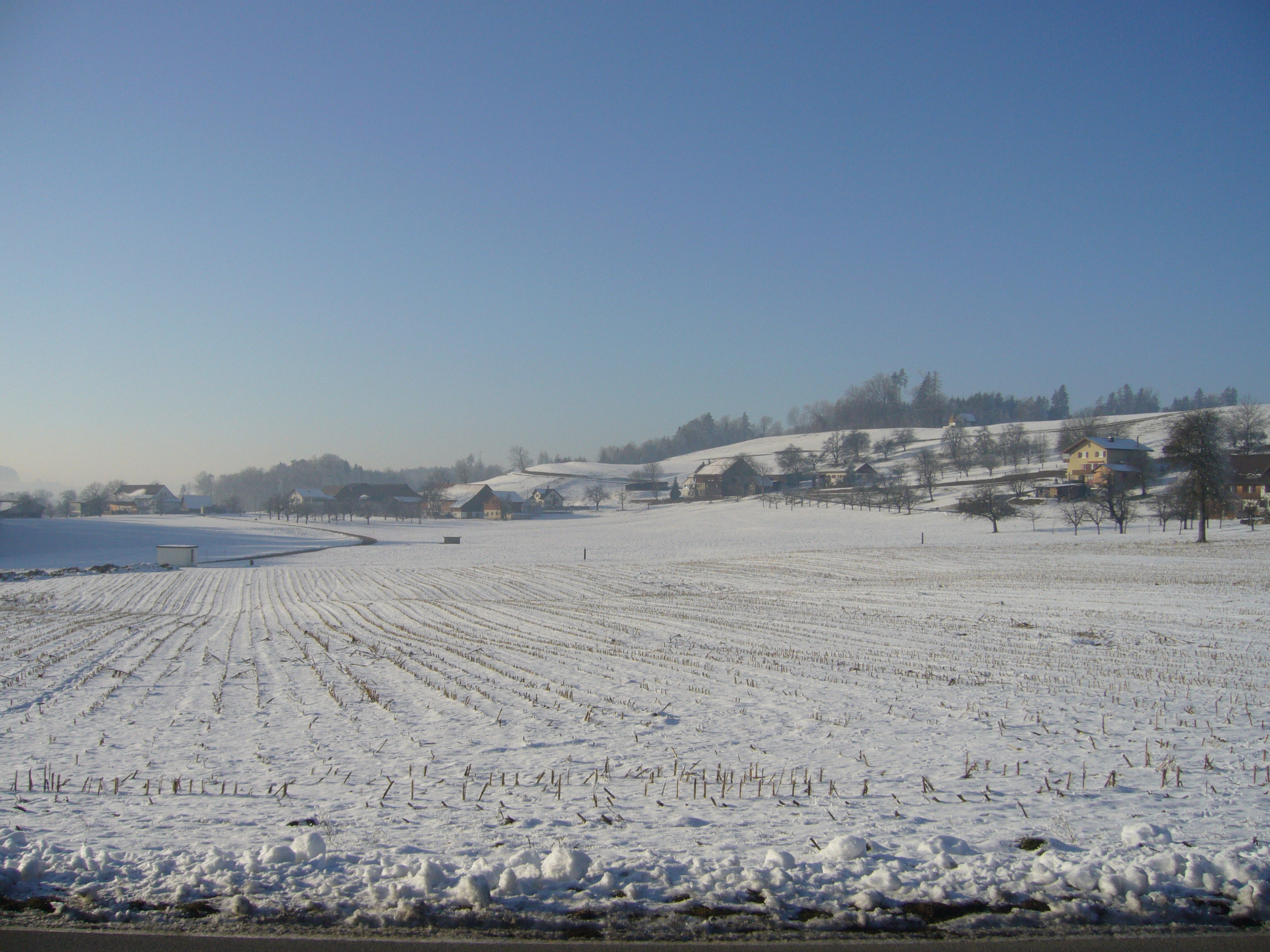
Fields near Hinterhalingen

Matzingen has an area, as of 2009, of 7.71 square kilometers (2.98 sq mi). Of this area, 4.43 km^{2} (1.71 sq mi) or 57.5% is used for agricultural purposes, while 1.94 km^{2} (0.75 sq mi) or 25.2% is forested. Of the rest of the land, 1.23 km^{2} (0.47 sq mi) or 16.0% is settled (buildings or roads), 0.1 km^{2} (25 acres) or 1.3% is either rivers or lakes and 0.01 km^{2} (2.5 acres) or 0.1% is unproductive land.

Of the built up area, industrial buildings made up 6.5% of the total area while housing and buildings made up 1.0% and transportation infrastructure made up 1.2%. while parks, green belts and sports fields made up 6.5%. Out of the forested land, all of the forested land area is covered with heavy forests. Of the agricultural land, 55.3% is used for growing crops, while 2.2% is used for orchards or vine crops. Of the water in the municipality, 0.3% is in lakes and 1.0% is in rivers and streams.

The municipality is located in the Frauenfeld district. It is located 5 km (3.1 mi) south-east of Frauenfeld at the confluence of the Lauche and Lützelmurg rivers in the Murg river. It consists of the village of Matzingen and the communities of Stettfurt, Dingenhart, Halingen and Ristenbühl.

== Demographics ==
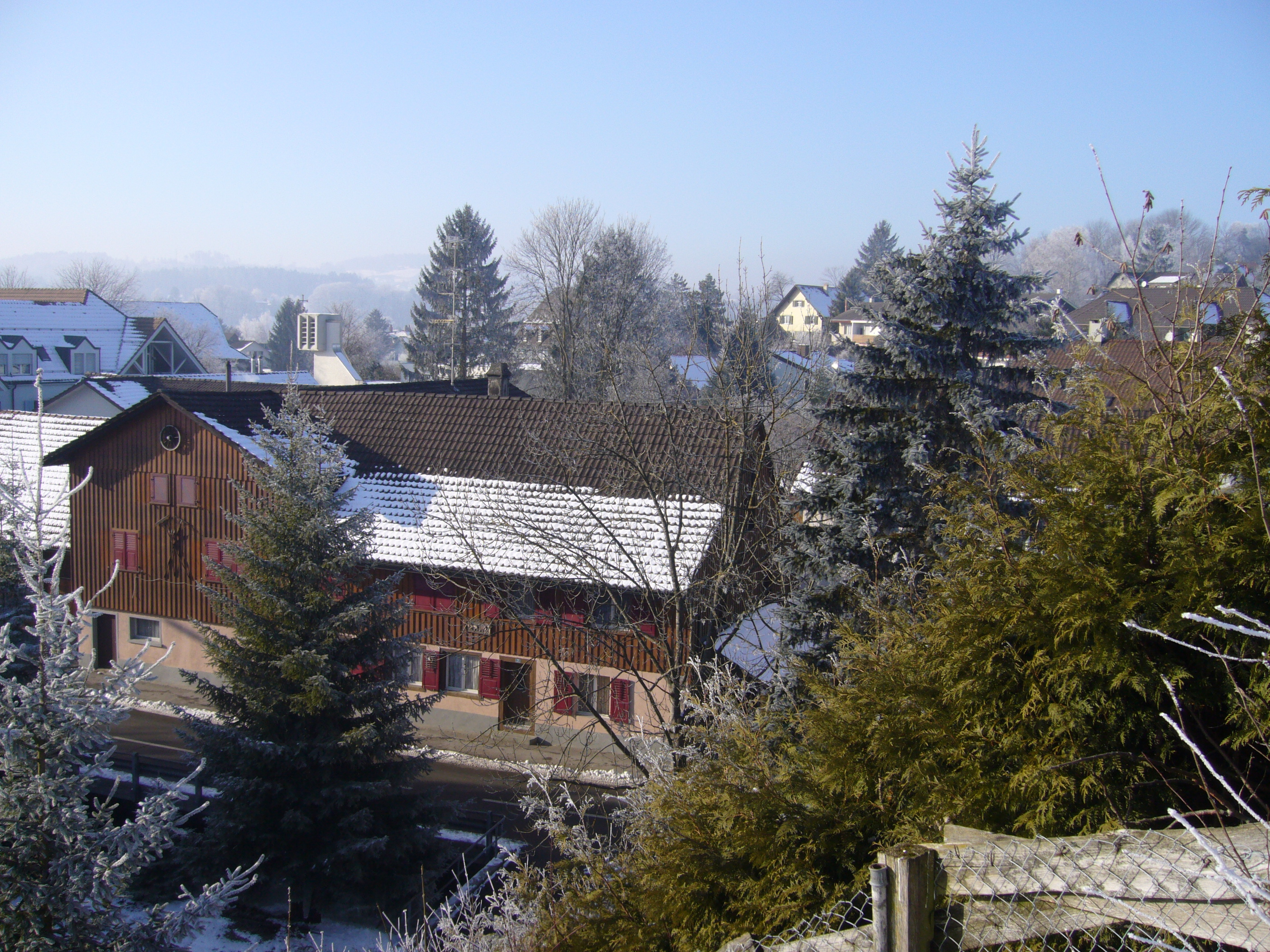
Matzingen town

Matzingen has a population (as of December 2020) of 3,029 As of 2008, 20.2% of the population are foreign nationals. Over the last 10 years (1997–2007) the population has changed at a rate of 8.9%. Most of the population (as of 2000) speaks German(88.7%), with Italian being second most common ( 2.7%) and Albanian being third ( 2.6%).

As of 2008, the gender distribution of the population was 51.2% male and 48.8% female. The population was made up of 1,003 Swiss men (40.3% of the population), and 272 (10.9%) non-Swiss men. There were 984 Swiss women (39.5%), and 232 (9.3%) non-Swiss women.

In 2008 there were 16 live births to Swiss citizens and 7 births to non-Swiss citizens, and in same time span there were 12 deaths of Swiss citizens and 1 non-Swiss citizen death. Ignoring immigration and emigration, the population of Swiss citizens increased by 4 while the foreign population increased by 6. There were 3 Swiss men who emigrated from Switzerland to another country, 1 Swiss woman who emigrated from Switzerland to another country, 10 non-Swiss men who emigrated from Switzerland to another country and 11 non-Swiss women who emigrated from Switzerland to another country. The total Swiss population change in 2008 (from all sources) was an increase of 14 and the non-Swiss population change was an increase of 14 people. This represents a population growth rate of 1.1%.

The age distribution, as of 2009, in Matzingen is; 268 children or 10.6% of the population are between 0 and 9 years old and 359 teenagers or 14.2% are between 10 and 19. Of the adult population, 349 people or 13.8% of the population are between 20 and 29 years old. 304 people or 12.0% are between 30 and 39, 447 people or 17.7% are between 40 and 49, and 379 people or 15.0% are between 50 and 59. The senior population distribution is 204 people or 8.1% of the population are between 60 and 69 years old, 133 people or 5.3% are between 70 and 79, there are 77 people or 3.0% who are between 80 and 89, and there are 10 people or 0.4% who are 90 and older.

As of 2000, there were 888 private households in the municipality, and an average of 2.6 persons per household. In 2000 there were 374 single family homes (or 80.8% of the total) out of a total of 463 inhabited buildings. There were 36 two family buildings (7.8%), 13 three family buildings (2.8%) and 40 multi-family buildings (or 8.6%). There were 492 (or 21.2%) persons who were part of a couple without children, and 1,404 (or 60.4%) who were part of a couple with children. There were 134 (or 5.8%) people who lived in single parent home, while there are 8 persons who were adult children living with one or both parents, 7 persons who lived in a household made up of relatives, 22 who lived in a household made up of unrelated persons, and 19 who are either institutionalized or live in another type of collective housing.

The vacancy rate for the municipality, in 2008, was 3.9%. As of 2007, the construction rate of new housing units was 3.2 new units per 1000 residents. In 2000 there were 949 apartments in the municipality. The most common apartment size was the 4 room apartment of which there were 273. There were 34 single room apartments and 138 apartments with six or more rooms. As of 2000 the average price to rent an average apartment in Matzingen was 1011.71 Swiss francs (CHF) per month (US$810, £460, €650 approx. exchange rate from 2000). The average rate for a one-room apartment was 455.57 CHF (US$360, £210, €290), a two-room apartment was about 730.92 CHF (US$580, £330, €470), a three-room apartment was about 825.74 CHF (US$660, £370, €530) and a six or more room apartment cost an average of 1582.69 CHF (US$1270, £710, €1010). The average apartment price in Matzingen was 90.7% of the national average of 1116 CHF.

In the 2007 federal election the most popular party was the SVP which received 46.84% of the vote. The next three most popular parties were the SP (14.12%), the CVP (13.87%) and the Green Party (8.92%). In the federal election, a total of 686 votes were cast, and the voter turnout was 45.1%.

The historical population is given in the following table:

year	population
1870	690
1900	730
1950	1,026
1990	1,841
2000	2,324

== Economy ==
As of 2007, Matzingen had an unemployment rate of 2.08%. As of 2005, there were 85 people employed in the primary economic sector and about 33 businesses involved in this sector. 478 people are employed in the secondary sector and there are 38 businesses in this sector. 348 people are employed in the tertiary sector, with 74 businesses in this sector.

In 2000 there were 1,613 workers who lived in the municipality. Of these, 829 or about 51.4% of the residents worked outside Matzingen while 519 people commuted into the municipality for work. There were a total of 1,303 jobs (of at least 6 hours per week) in the municipality. Of the working population, 11.6% used public transportation to get to work, and 50.9% used a private car.

== Religion ==
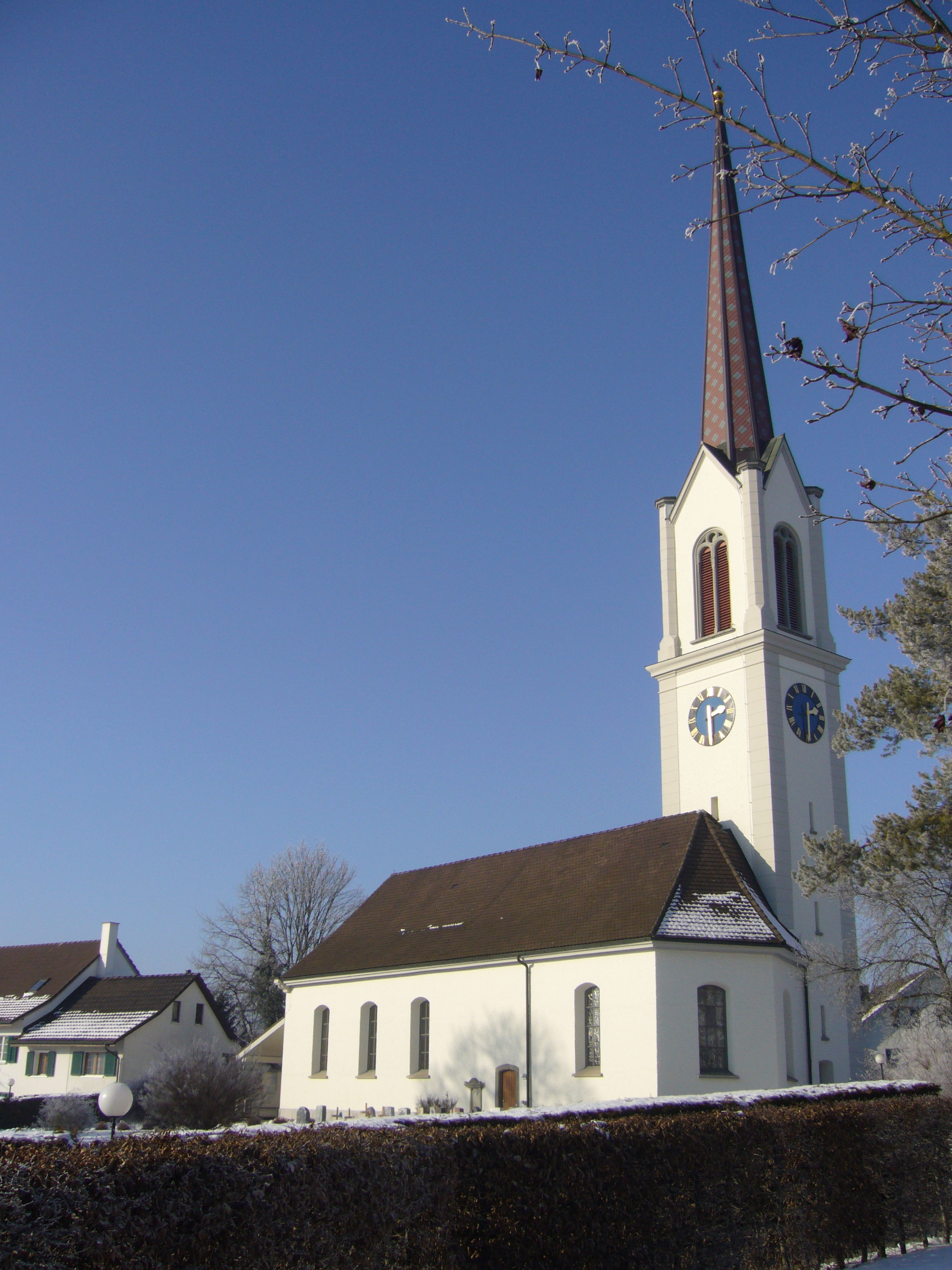
Church in Matzingen

From the 2000 census, 724 or 31.2% were Roman Catholic, while 1,090 or 46.9% belonged to the Swiss Reformed Church. Of the rest of the population, there was 1 Old Catholic who belonged to the Christian Catholic Church of Switzerland there are 37 individuals (or about 1.59% of the population) who belong to the Orthodox Church, and there are 51 individuals (or about 2.19% of the population) who belong to another Christian church. There were 147 (or about 6.33% of the population) who are Islamic. There are 7 individuals (or about 0.30% of the population) who belong to another church (not listed on the census), 195 (or about 8.39% of the population) belong to no church, are agnostic or atheist, and 72 individuals (or about 3.10% of the population) did not answer the question.

== Education ==
In Matzingen about 72.1% of the population (between age 25-64) have completed either non-mandatory upper secondary education or additional higher education (either university or a Fachhochschule).

Matzingen is home to the Matzingen primary school district. In the 2008/2009 school year there were 242 students. There were 47 children in the kindergarten, and the average class size was 15.67 kindergartners. Of the children in kindergarten, 25 or 53.2% were female, 18 or 38.3% were not Swiss citizens and 17 or 36.2% were not native German speakers. The lower and upper primary levels began at age 5-6 and lasted for 6 years. There were 93 children in who were at the lower primary level and 102 children in the upper primary level. The average class size in the primary school was 22 students. At the lower primary level, there were 32 children or 34.4% of the total population who were female, 29 or 31.2% were not Swiss citizens and 30 or 32.3% were not native German speakers. In the upper primary level, there were 44 or 43.1% who were female, 25 or 24.5% were not Swiss citizens and 26 or 25.5% were not native German speakers.

== Transportation ==
The municipality has two railway stations, Matzingen and Weberei Matzingen. Both are located on the Frauenfeld–Wil line and served by the S15 of the St. Gallen S-Bahn.
