= Wängi =

- Municipality
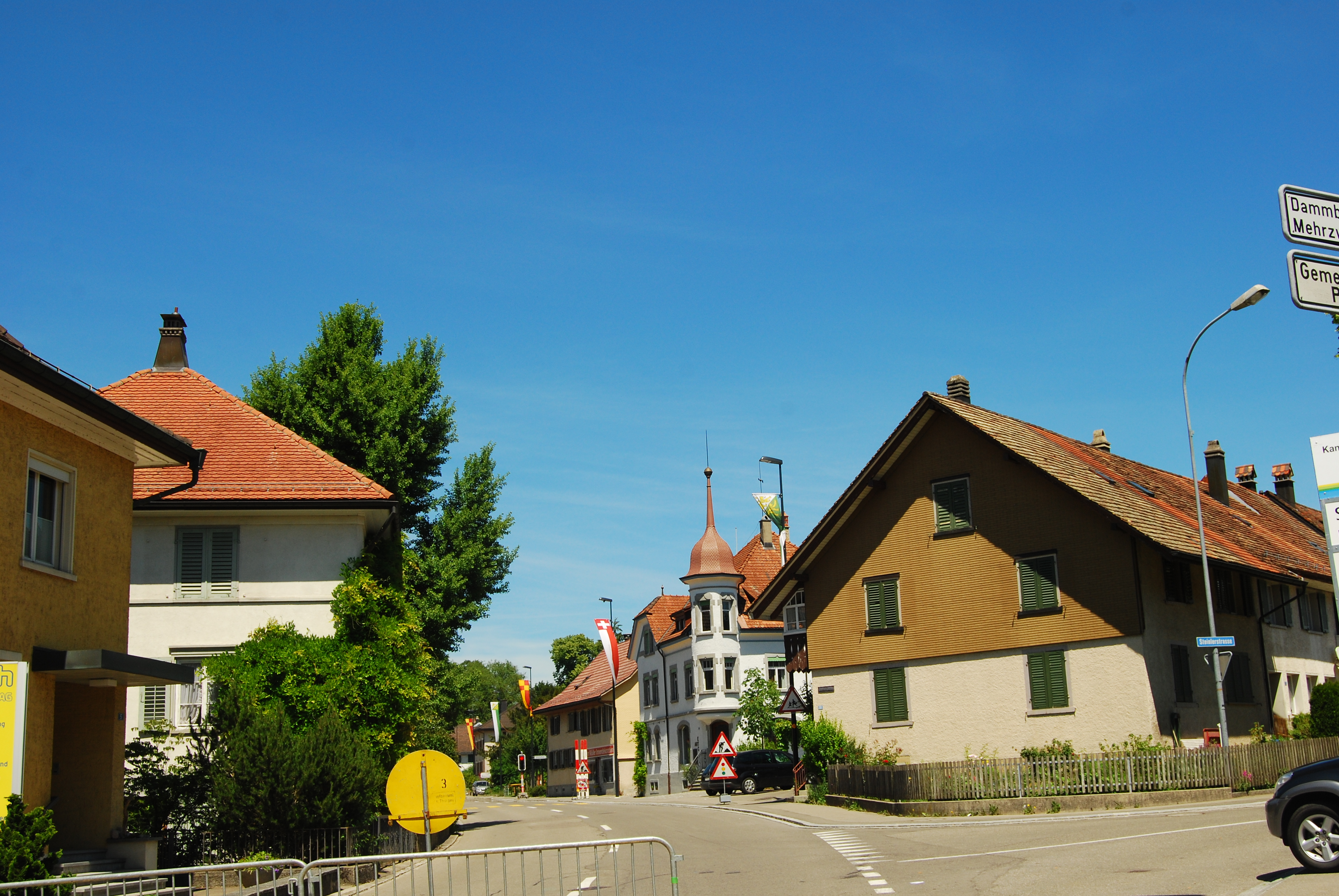

- Coat of arms
- Location of Wängi
- Location within Switzerland Location within Canton of Thurgau
- Coordinates: 47°30′N 8°57′E
- Country: Switzerland
- Canton: Thurgau
- District: Münchwilen

Area
  - Total: 16.4 km^{2} (6.3 sq mi)
- Elevation: 470 m (1,540 ft)

Population (December 2007)
  - Total: 4,059
  - Density: 248/km^{2} (641/sq mi)
- Time zone: UTC+01:00 (CET)
  - Summer (DST): UTC+02:00 (CEST)
- Postal code: 9545
- SFOS number: 4781
- ISO 3166 code: CH-TG
- Surrounded by: Aadorf, Bettwiesen, Bichelsee-Balterswil, Eschlikon, Lommis, Matzingen, Münchwilen, Stettfurt
- Website: waengi.ch

Wängi is a municipality in the district of Münchwilen in the canton of Thurgau in Switzerland.

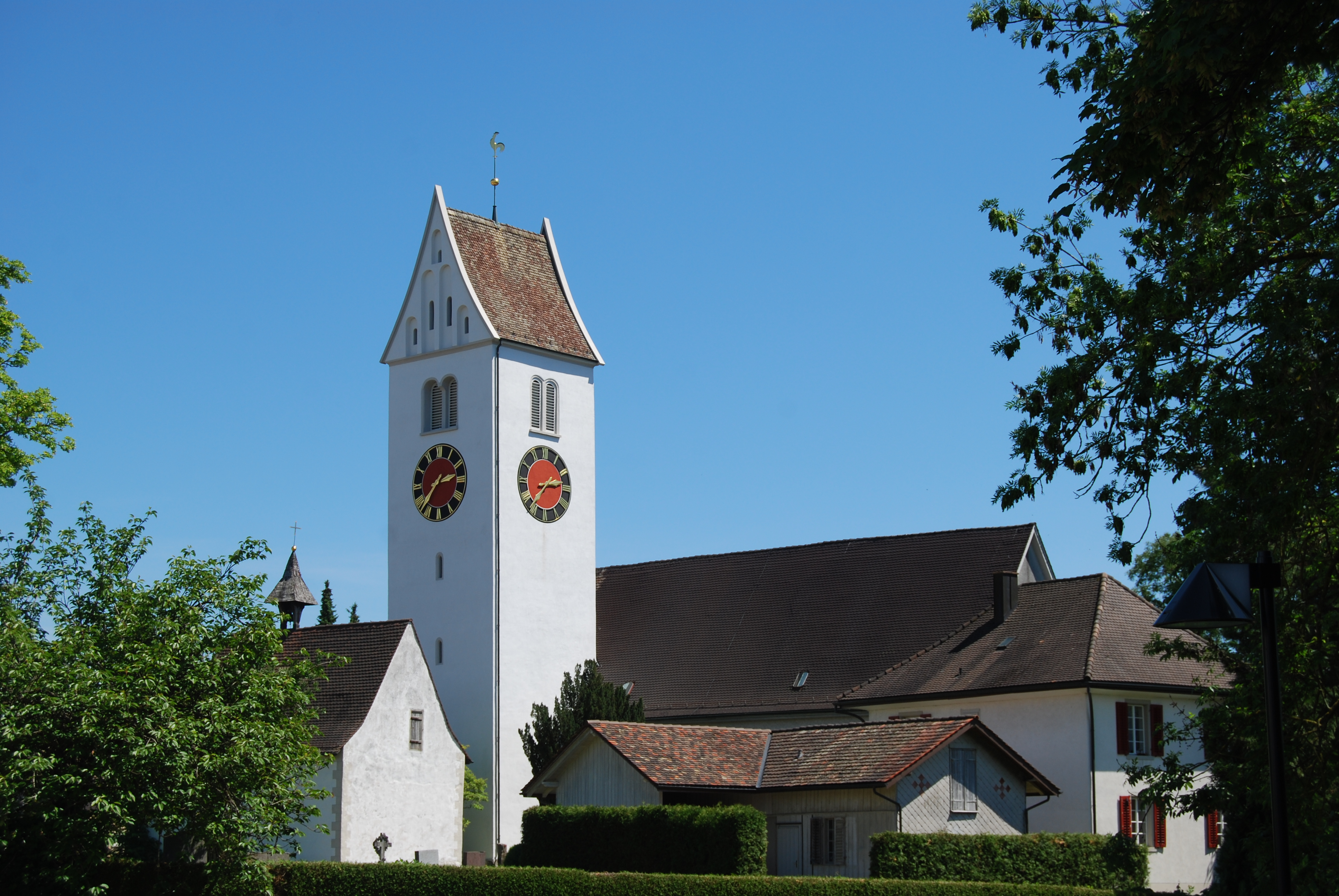
Wängi

== Geography ==
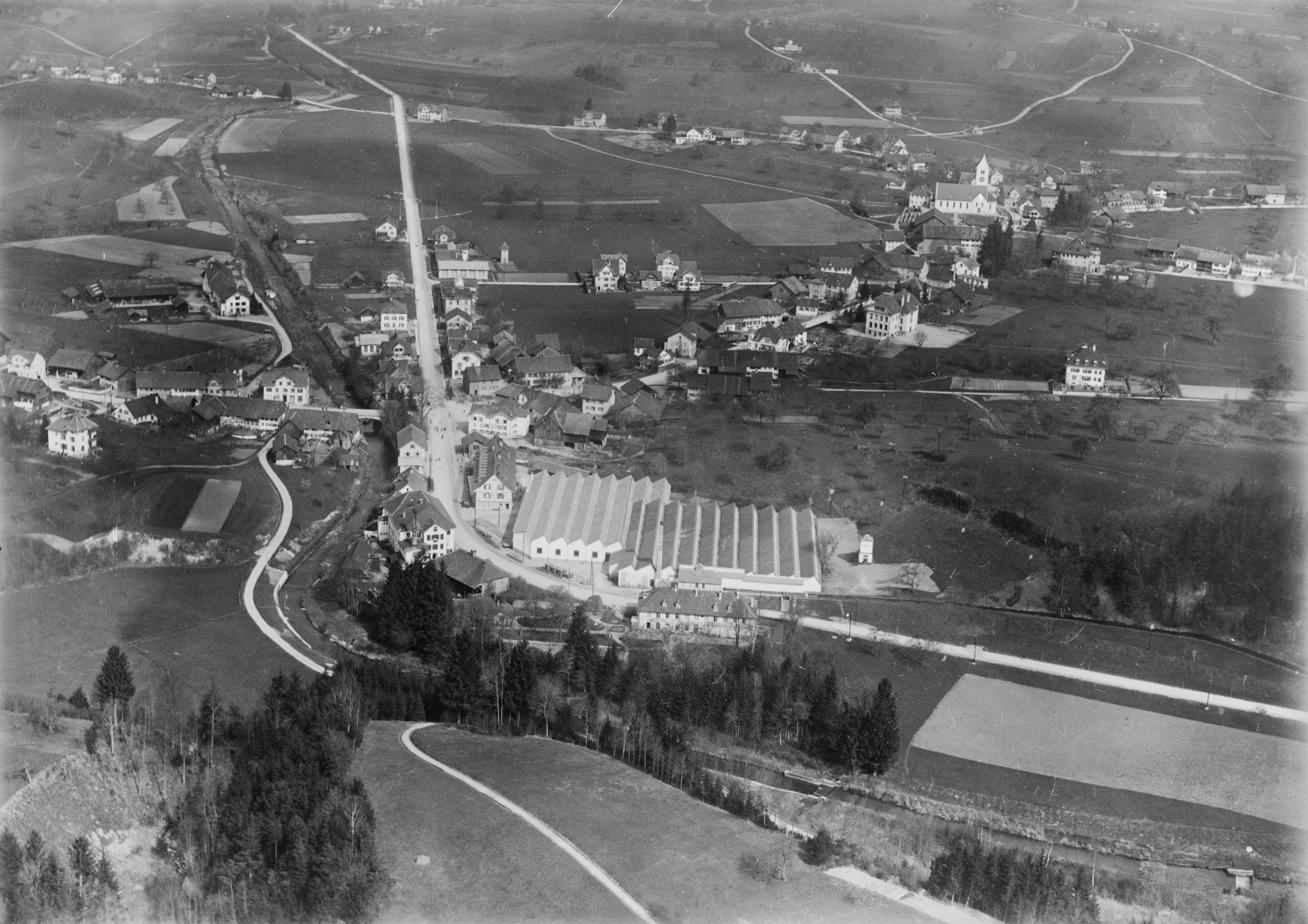
Aerial view from 200 m by Walter Mittelholzer (1920)

Wängi has an area, as of 2009, of 16.43 square kilometers (6.34 sq mi). Of this area, 11.68 km^{2} (4.51 sq mi) or 71.1% is used for agricultural purposes, while 2.67 km^{2} (1.03 sq mi) or 16.3% is forested. Of the rest of the land, 2.02 km^{2} (0.78 sq mi) or 12.3% is settled (buildings or roads), 0.07 km^{2} (17 acres) or 0.4% is either rivers or lakes and 0.01 km^{2} (2.5 acres) or 0.1% is unproductive land.

Of the built up area, industrial buildings made up 5.7% of the total area while housing and buildings made up 0.7% and transportation infrastructure made up 0.4%. while parks, green belts and sports fields made up 4.9%. Out of the forested land, 15.0% of the total land area is heavily forested and 1.3% is covered with orchards or small clusters of trees. Of the agricultural land, 67.4% is used for growing crops, while 3.7% is used for orchards or vine crops. All the water in the municipality is flowing water.

In 1969 Krillberg and Tuttwil merged into Wängi.

== Demographics ==
Wängi has a population (as of December 2020) of 4,766. As of 2008, 12.7% of the population are foreign nationals. Over the last 10 years (1997–2007) the population has changed at a rate of 2.3%. Most of the population (as of 2000) speaks German (90.5%), with Albanian being second most common ( 2.2%) and Italian being third ( 2.1%).

As of 2008, the gender distribution of the population was 50.9% male and 49.1% female. The population was made up of 1,813 Swiss men (44.2% of the population), and 277 (6.7%) non-Swiss men. There were 1,772 Swiss women (43.2%), and 244 (5.9%) non-Swiss women.

In 2008 there were 35 live births to Swiss citizens and 6 births to non-Swiss citizens, and in same time span there were 27 deaths of Swiss citizens. Ignoring immigration and emigration, the population of Swiss citizens increased by 8 while the foreign population increased by 6. There were 2 Swiss men who emigrated from Switzerland to another country, 7 Swiss women who emigrated from Switzerland to another country, 11 non-Swiss men who emigrated from Switzerland to another country and 9 non-Swiss women who emigrated from Switzerland to another country. The total Swiss population change in 2008 (from all sources) was an increase of 15 and the non-Swiss population change was a decrease of 2 people. This represents a population growth rate of 0.3%.

The age distribution, as of 2009, in Wängi is; 427 children or 10.5% of the population are between 0 and 9 years old and 589 teenagers or 14.5% are between 10 and 19. Of the adult population, 478 people or 11.8% of the population are between 20 and 29 years old. 469 people or 11.5% are between 30 and 39, 746 people or 18.3% are between 40 and 49, and 551 people or 13.5% are between 50 and 59. The senior population distribution is 404 people or 9.9% of the population are between 60 and 69 years old, 255 people or 6.3% are between 70 and 79, there are 131 people or 3.2% who are between 80 and 89, and there are 17 people or 0.4% who are 90 and older.

As of 2000, there were 1,448 private households in the municipality, and an average of 2.7 persons per household. In 2000 there were 759 single family homes (or 87.4% of the total) out of a total of 868 inhabited buildings. There were 46 two family buildings (5.3%), 22 three family buildings (2.5%) and 41 multi-family buildings (or 4.7%). There were 883 (or 22.2%) persons who were part of a couple without children, and 2,378 (or 59.9%) who were part of a couple with children. There were 188 (or 4.7%) people who lived in single parent home, while there are 23 persons who were adult children living with one or both parents, 28 persons who lived in a household made up of relatives, 37 who lived in a household made up of unrelated persons, and 91 who are either institutionalized or live in another type of collective housing.

The vacancy rate for the municipality, in 2008, was 2.07%. As of 2007, the construction rate of new housing units was 6.8 new units per 1000 residents. In 2000 there were 1,531 apartments in the municipality. The most common apartment size was the 5 room apartment of which there were 403. There were 31 single room apartments and 389 apartments with six or more rooms. As of 2000 the average price to rent an average apartment in Wängi was 1050.32 Swiss francs (CHF) per month (US$840, £470, €670 approx. exchange rate from 2000). The average rate for a one-room apartment was 559.26 CHF (US$450, £250, €360), a two-room apartment was about 744.76 CHF (US$600, £340, €480), a three-room apartment was about 855.66 CHF (US$680, £390, €550) and a six or more room apartment cost an average of 1356.58 CHF (US$1090, £610, €870). The average apartment price in Wängi was 94.1% of the national average of 1116 CHF.

In the 2007 federal election the most popular party was the SVP which received 48.28% of the vote. The next three most popular parties were the CVP (19.83%), the Green Party (10.35%) and the FDP (7.57%). In the federal election, a total of 1,369 votes were cast, and the voter turnout was 49.4%.

The historical population is given in the following table:

year	population
1950	2,381
1960	2,588
1980	2,909
1990	3,387
2000	3,969

== Economy ==
As of 2007, Wängi had an unemployment rate of 1.56%. As of 2005, there were 197 people employed in the primary economic sector and about 74 businesses involved in this sector. 689 people are employed in the secondary sector and there are 66 businesses in this sector. 597 people are employed in the tertiary sector, with 120 businesses in this sector.

In 2000 there were 2,746 workers who lived in the municipality. Of these, 1,314 or about 47.9% of the residents worked outside Wängi while 635 people commuted into the municipality for work. There were a total of 2,067 jobs (of at least 6 hours per week) in the municipality. Of the working population, 11.7% used public transportation to get to work, and 50.1% used a private car.

== Religion ==
From the 2000 census, 1,648 or 41.5% were Roman Catholic, while 1,601 or 40.3% belonged to the Swiss Reformed Church. Of the rest of the population, there are 81 individuals (or about 2.04% of the population) who belong to the Orthodox Church, and there are 122 individuals (or about 3.07% of the population) who belong to another Christian church. There was 1 individual who was Jewish, and 147 (or about 3.70% of the population) who are Islamic. There are 18 individuals (or about 0.45% of the population) who belong to another church (not listed on the census), 236 (or about 5.95% of the population) belong to no church, are agnostic or atheist, and 115 individuals (or about 2.90% of the population) did not answer the question.

== Education ==
In Wängi about 72.8% of the population (between ages 25 and 64) have completed either non-mandatory upper secondary education or additional higher education (either university or a Fachhochschule).

Wängi is home to the Wängi primary and secondary school district. In the 2008/2009 school year there were 426 students. There were 99 children in the kindergarten, and the average class size was 19.8 kindergartners. Of the children in kindergarten, 44 or 44.4% were female, 17 or 17.2% were not Swiss citizens and 15 or 15.2% did not speak German natively. The lower and upper primary levels begin at about age 5-6 and last for 6 years. There were 149 children in who were at the lower primary level and 178 children in the upper primary level. The average class size in the primary school was 20.53 students. At the lower primary level, there were 63 children or 42.3% of the total population who were female, 22 or 14.8% were not Swiss citizens and 21 or 14.1% did not speak German natively. In the upper primary level, there were 80 or 44.9% who were female, 21 or 11.8% were not Swiss citizens and 18 or 10.1% did not speak German natively.

At the secondary level, students are divided according to performance. The secondary level begins at about age 12 and usually lasts 3 years. Finally, there were 174 teenagers who were in special or remedial classes, of which 92 or 52.9% were female, 25 or 14.4% were not Swiss citizens and 23 or 13.2% did not speak German natively.

== Transportation ==
The municipality has four railway stations: Wängi, Jakobstal, Rosental, and Wiesengrund. All four are located on the Frauenfeld–Wil line and served by the S15 of the St. Gallen S-Bahn.
