= Frauenfeld–Wil Railway =

Railway line in canton of Thurgau, Switzerland

Frauenfeld–Wil-Bahn (fwb, S15)
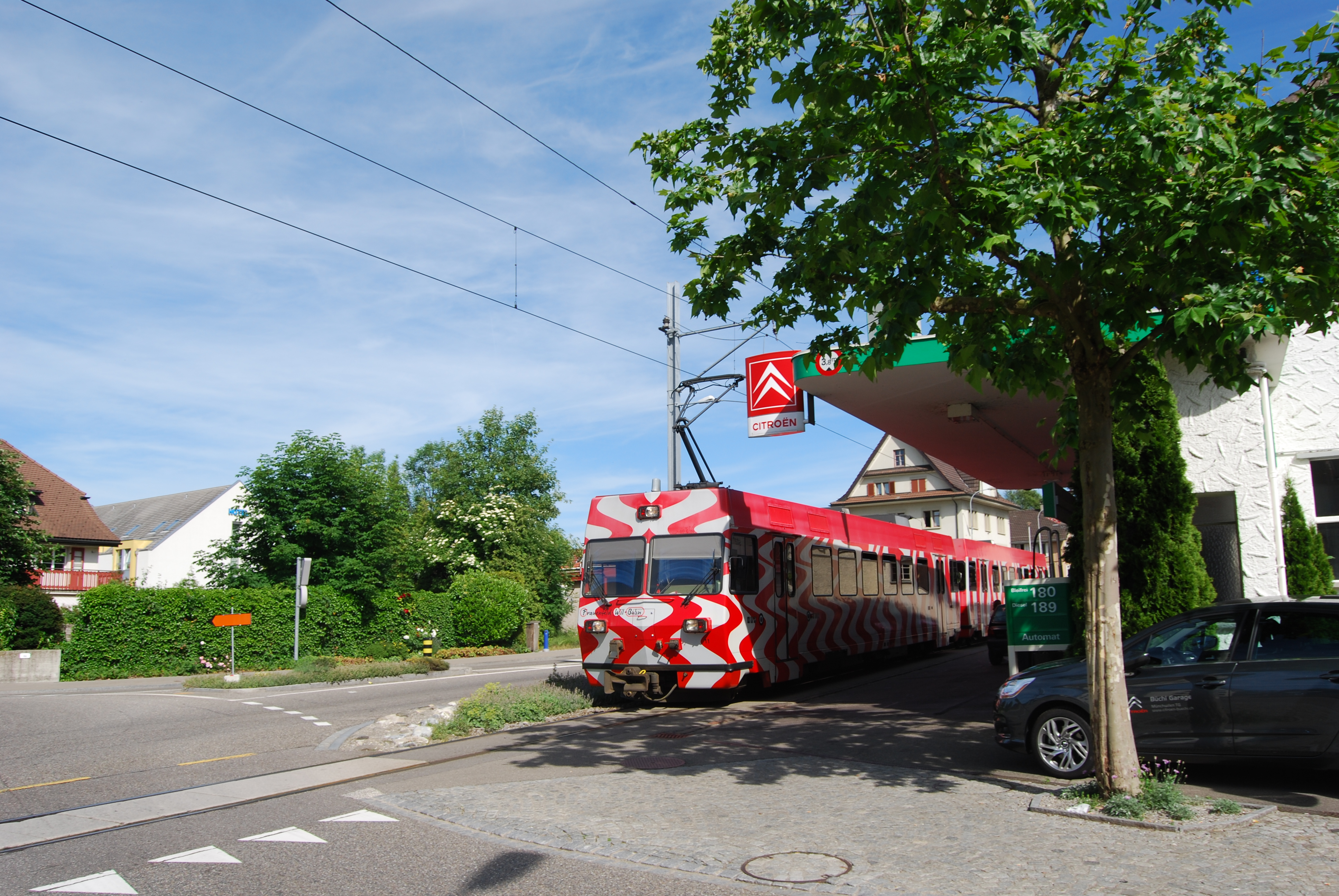
- An old Frauenfeld–Wil train in Münchwilen

Overview
- Native name: Frauenfeld–Wil-Bahn (fwb)
- Status: operative
- Owner: Appenzell Railways (AB, since 11 June 2021)
- Locale: Switzerland
- Termini: Frauenfeld; Wil
- Stations: 15 (5 stations + 10 stops)
- Website: Fahrplan

Service
- Type: Light rail
- System: OSTWIND
- Services: S15
- Operator: AB
- Rolling stock: 5

History
- Opened: 1887 (electrification 1921)

Technical
- Line length: 19.14 km (11.89 mi)
- Track length: 20.19 km (12.55 mi)
- Number of tracks: 1
- Character: 841
- Track gauge: 1,000 mm (3 ft 3 3/8 in) metre gauge
- Minimum radius: 40m
- Electrification: Overhead line, 1,200 V DC
- Highest elevation: 570.8 m (1,873 ft)
- Maximum incline: 46 ‰ or 4.6 %

The Frauenfeld–Wil Railway (German: Frauenfeld–Wil–Bahn, fwb) is a 1,000 mm (3 ft 3 3/8 in) metre gauge railway line in Switzerland, which connects the town of Frauenfeld in the canton of Thurgau, to the town of Wil in the canton of St. Gallen, following the valley of the river Murg. The fwb opened the line in 1887 and operated it until 2021, when that company merged into Appenzell Railways. The line is included in fare network OSTWIND, and operates as service S15 of the St. Gallen S-Bahn.

Plans to build an interurban tramway between Frauenfeld and Wil were first made in the early 1850s. The rail line opened in 1887, and was electrified in 1921. Around 1.25 million passengers use the line every year.

Locals call the train "Wilerbähnli" or "Wiler Bähnli".

== Operation ==
S15

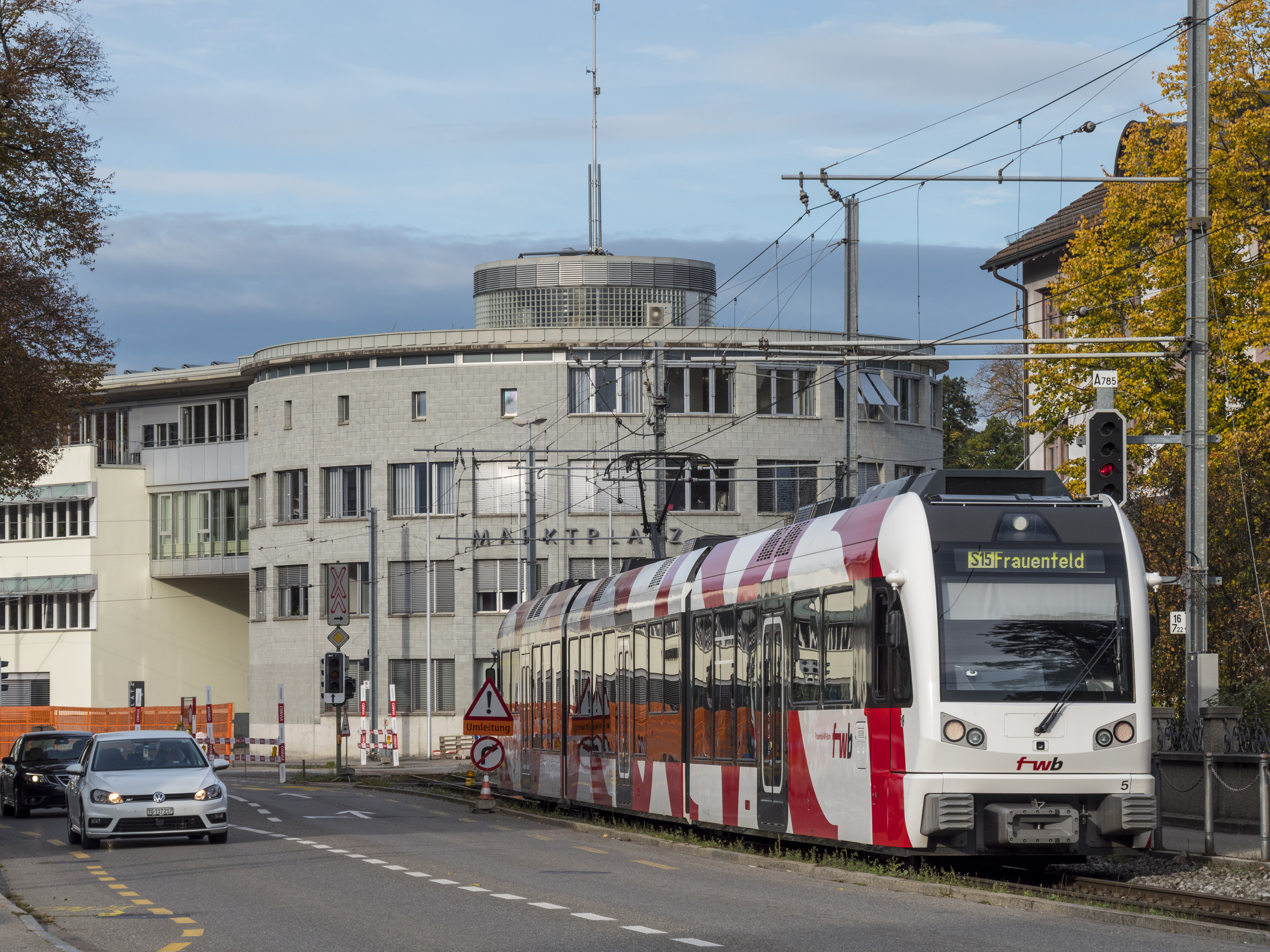
- FW ABe 4-8 near Frauenfeld Marktplatz

Overview
- Service type: St. Gallen S-Bahn service
- Current operator: Appenzell Railways (AB)
- Former operator: Frauenfeld-Wil Bahn (FWB)

Route
- Termini: Frauenfeld; Wil SG
- Stops: 10
- Service frequency: Every 30 minutes

Technical
- Rolling stock: Class ABe 4-8 EMUs

Trains run every 30 minutes as S15 service of St. Gallen S-Bahn, requiring 3 trains in operation at once, with trains crossing at the stations of Matzingen and Schweizerhof.

In 2011 the railway company ordered five new ABe4/8 low floor trains from Stadler Rail, to replace the old trains. However, there are plans for a 15 minutes interval in future and therefore some of the old trains will be retained. The first train was delivered in March 2013 and was tested for 3 months. It went into regular service on 26 June 2013. FWB closed the station at Murkart in 2018 in order to maintain connections with long-distance trains at Frauenfeld.

== Route ==
S15 Frauenfeld – Wängi – Wil SG

- Frauenfeld
- Frauenfeld Marktplatz
- Lüdem (stops only on request)
- Weberei Matzingen (stops only on request)
- Matzingen
- Jakobstal (stops only on request)
- Wiesengrund (stops only on request)
- Wängi
- Rosental (stops only on request)
- Münchwilen Pflegeheim (stops only on request)
- Münchwilen TG
- Wil SG

== Freight traffic ==
Freight trains ran on the line from 1907 until the early 2000s. This included transporter wagons from 1977 onwards.
