= Wil railway station =

Railway station in Wil, Switzerland

Wil
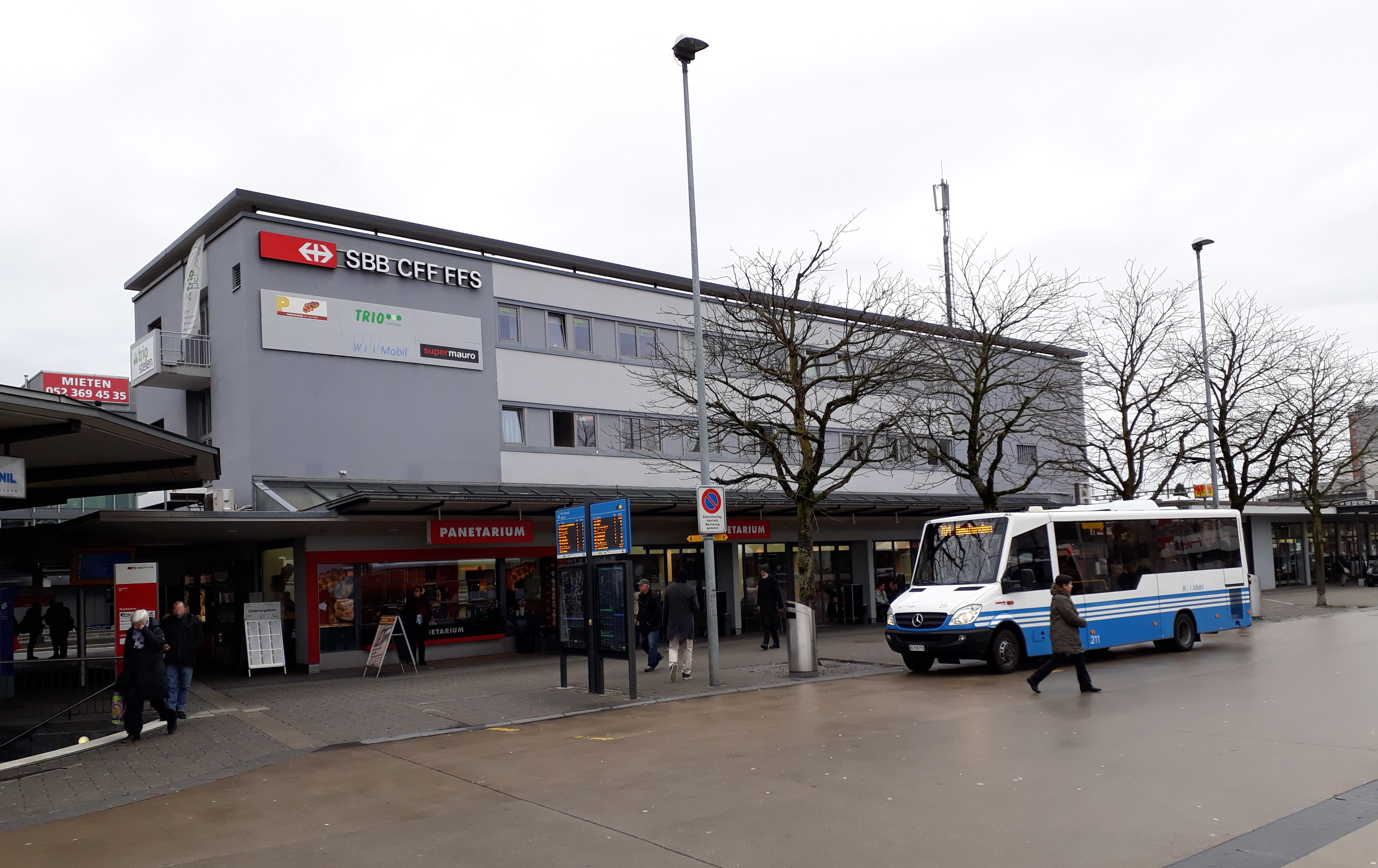
- The Wil station building in 2018

General information
- Location: Bahnhofplatz 3 Wil, St. Gallen; Switzerland
- Coordinates: 47°27′45″N 9°02′28″E
- Elevation: 570 m (1,870 ft)
- Owner: Swiss Federal Railways
- Lines: Wil–Kreuzlingen line; St. Gallen–Winterthur line; Wil–Ebnat-Kappel line; Frauenfeld–Wil line
- Distance: 110.6 km (68.7 mi) from Sargans
- Platforms: 6 (main station); 2 (Frauenfeld–Wil)
- Train operators: Swiss Federal Railways; Thurbo; Frauenfeld-Wil-Bahn AG
- Connections
- Bus: PostAuto Schweiz 722 724 725 726 730 WilMobil 701 702 703 704 705 706 732 733 734 735 Regiobus 729 731

Other information
- Fare zone: 916 (Tarifverbund Ostwind)

Passengers
- 2025: 18,300 per day (excluding the FW) (SBB, Thurbo)
- Rank: 44 out of 1,095

Services
Preceding station	SBB CFF FFS	Following station
Winterthur towards Geneva Airport	IC 1	Uzwil towards St. Gallen
Winterthur towards Zürich HB	IR 13	Uzwil towards Sargans
Preceding station	St. Gallen S-Bahn	Following station
Terminus	S1	Uzwil towards Schaffhausen
Bazenheid towards Wattwil	S9	Terminus
Terminus	S10	Bronschhofen towards Romanshorn
Münchwilen towards Frauenfeld	S15	Terminus
Münchwilen towards Frauenfeld	SN15 Limited service	Terminus
Sirnach towards Winterthur	SN21 Limited service	Uzwil towards St. Gallen
Winterthur Terminus	SN22 Limited service	Uzwil towards Heerbrugg
Preceding station	Zurich S-Bahn	Following station
Sirnach towards Brugg AG	S12	Terminus
Sirnach towards Winterthur	S35	Terminus
Location
- Location within Switzerland Location within Canton of St. Gallen

Wil railway station (German: Bahnhof Wil), or Wil SG railway station, is a railway station in Wil, in the Swiss canton of St. Gallen. It sits at the junction of three standard-gauge railway lines: Wil–Kreuzlingen, St. Gallen–Winterthur, and Wil–Ebnat-Kappel. In addition, the 1,000 mm (3 ft 3 3/8 in) metre gauge Frauenfeld–Wil line (operated by Appenzell Railways since 2021) terminates in the station's forecourt.

== Layout ==
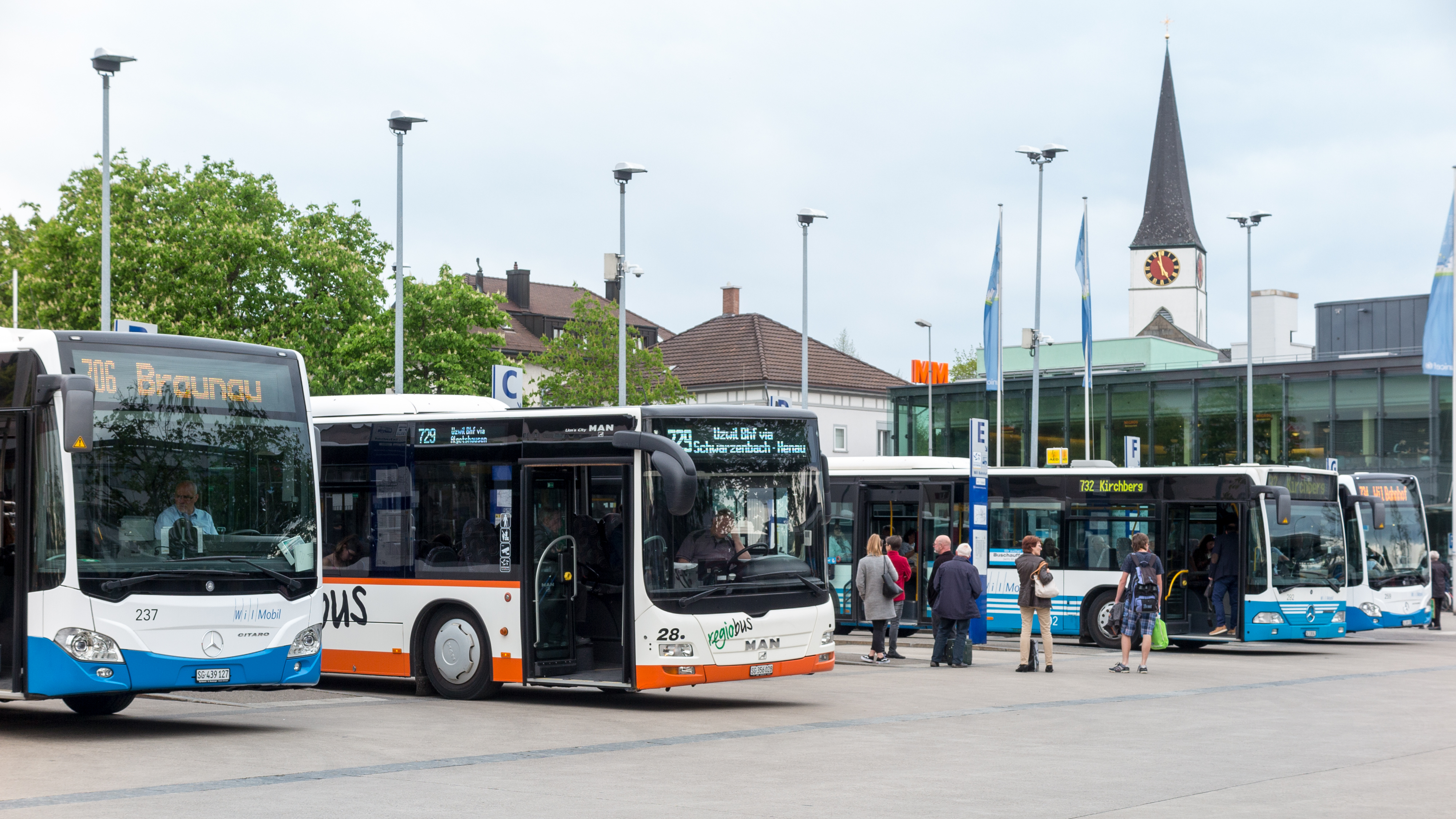
Bus station

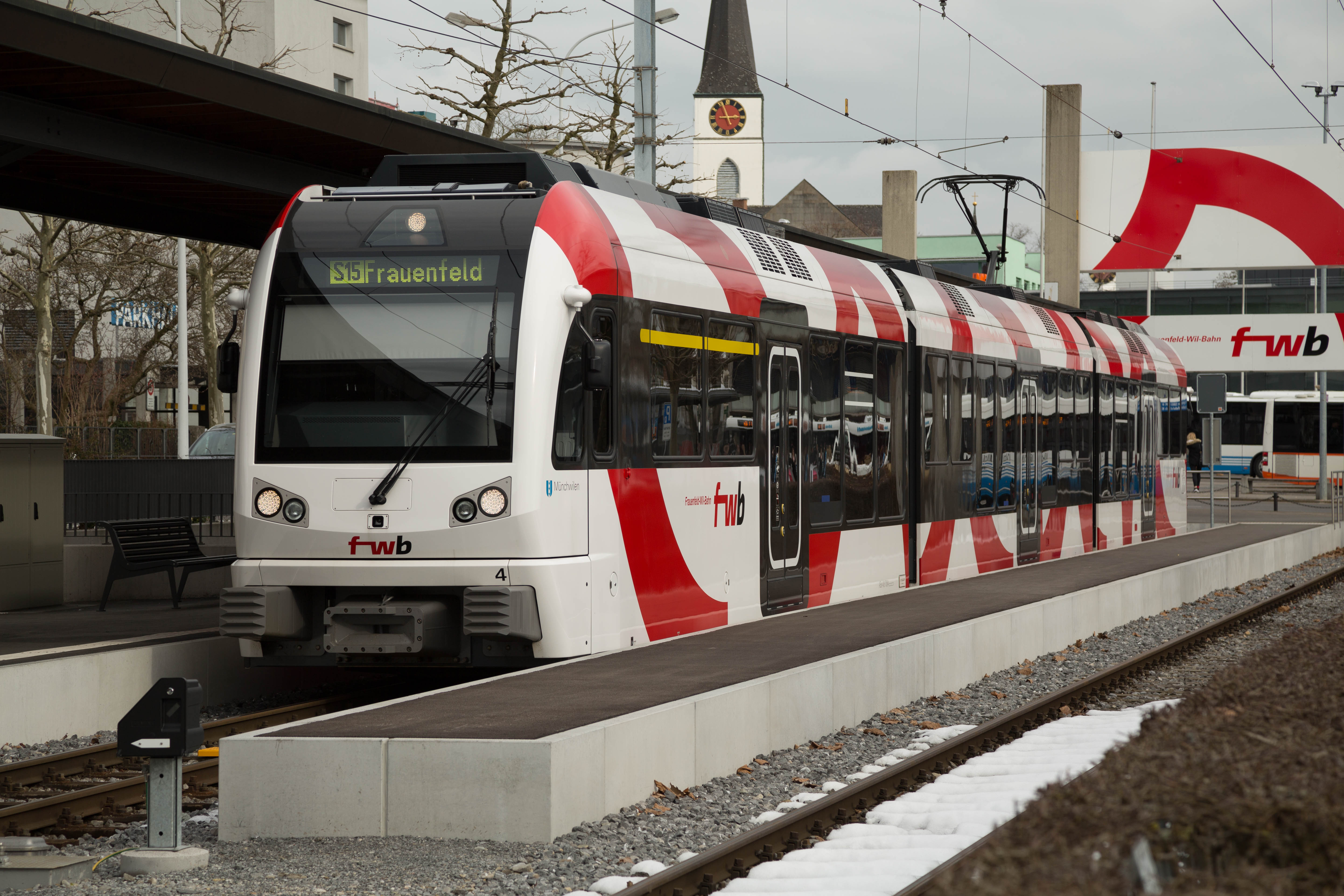
S15 train at Wil railway station

The station has two island platforms and two side platforms on the St. Gallen–Winterthur line, with tracks (Gleis) numbered 1–6. These tracks are used by InterCity (IC), InterRegio (IR) and most S-Bahn services. The Frauenfeld–Wil railway (S15) departs from the station's forecourt (Bahnhofplatz) north of the station building, where two platforms and tracks (Gleis 11/12) exist.

PostAuto Schweiz, WilMobil and RegioBus bus lines depart from the bus station in front of the station building.

== Services ==
As of the December 2023 timetable change, the following services stop at Wil:

- InterCity / InterRegio:
  - /: half-hourly service between Zürich HB and St. Gallen and hourly service to Geneva Airport and Chur.
- St. Gallen S-Bahn (some services also belong to Bodensee S-Bahn):
  - S1: half-hourly service over the St. Gallen–Winterthur line to Schaffhausen (via St. Gallen and Kreuzlingen), supplementing the long-distance services.
  - S9: half-hourly service over the Wil–Ebnat-Kappel line to Wattwil.
  - S10: half-hourly service over the Wil–Kreuzlingen line to Weinfelden and Romanshorn.
  - S15: half-hourly service over the metre-gauge Frauenfeld–Wil line to Frauenfeld via Wängi.
- Zurich S-Bahn:
  - S12 / S35: half-hourly service over the St. Gallen–Winterthur line to Brugg AG (via Zürich HB) / Winterthur, supplementing the long-distance services.

During weekends, the station is served by three nighttime S-Bahn services (SN15, SN21, SN22), offered by Ostwind fare network, and operated by Thurbo and Appenzell Railways for St. Gallen S-Bahn.

- St. Gallen S-Bahn:
  - SN15: hourly service to Frauenfeld.
  - SN21: hourly service to Winterthur and to St. Gallen.
  - SN22: hourly service to Winterthur and to Heerbrugg (via St. Gallen).

== See also ==
- Rail transport in Switzerland
