= Frauenfeld railway station =

Railway station in Frauenfeld, Switzerland

Frauenfeld
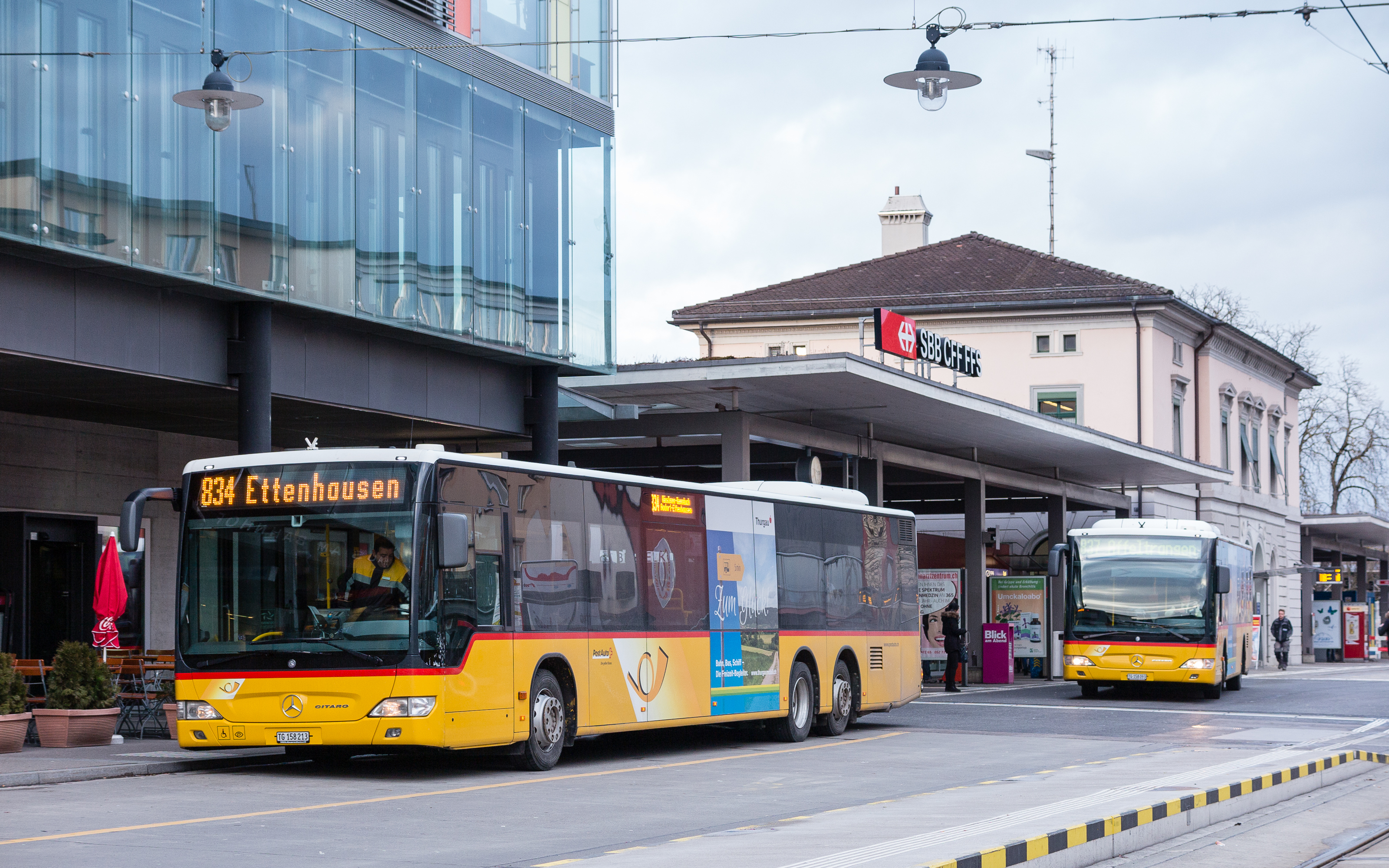
- The station building and forecourt in 2016

General information
- Location: Bahnhofplatz; Frauenfeld; Switzerland
- Coordinates: 47°33′29″N 8°53′49″E
- Elevation: 405 m (1,329 ft)
- Owner: Swiss Federal Railways
- Lines: Winterthur–Romanshorn; Frauenfeld–Wil
- Platforms: 1 island platform; 2 side platforms
- Tracks: 4
- Train operators: Frauenfeld-Wil-Bahn AG; Swiss Federal Railways; Thurbo
- Connections
- Bus: PostAuto Schweiz routes 819 822 823 825 826 829 834 836 837 838; Stadtbus Frauenfeld routes 801 802 803 804 805 811 812 813 814 815

Other information
- Fare zone: 921 (Tarifverbund Ostwind)

Passengers
- 2025: 10,600 per day (SBB, Thurbo)
- Rank: 72 out of 1,095

Services
Preceding station	SBB CFF FFS	Following station
Winterthur towards Brig	IC 8	Weinfelden towards Romanshorn
Winterthur towards Interlaken Ost	IC 81	Weinfelden towards Romanshorn
Winterthur towards Lucerne	IR 75	Weinfelden towards Konstanz
Preceding station	Zurich S-Bahn	Following station
Winterthur towards Zürich HB	S23	Weinfelden towards Romanshorn
Islikon towards Zug	S24	Felben-Wellhausen towards Weinfelden
Islikon towards Winterthur	S30	Felben-Wellhausen towards Weinfelden
Preceding station	St. Gallen S-Bahn	Following station
Frauenfeld Marktplatz towards Wil	S15	Terminus
Frauenfeld Marktplatz towards Wil	SN15 Limited service	Terminus
Islikon towards Winterthur	SN30 Limited service	Felben-Wellhausen towards Romanshorn
Location
- Location within Switzerland Location within Canton of Thurgau

Frauenfeld railway station is a railway station in the Swiss canton of Thurgau and municipality of Frauenfeld. The station is located on the Winterthur–Romanshorn railway line, and is the terminus of the narrow-gauge Frauenfeld–Wil railway line.

On the main line, Frauenfeld is an intermediate stop on the InterCity service from Brig to Romanshorn, the InterRegio service from Lucerne to Konstanz, and on Zurich S-Bahn services S24 and S30. Trains of the St. Gallen S-Bahn service S15 on the Frauenfeld–Wil railway line (operated by Appenzell Railways since 2021) departs from the Bahnhofplatz square in front of the station.

== Layout and connections ==
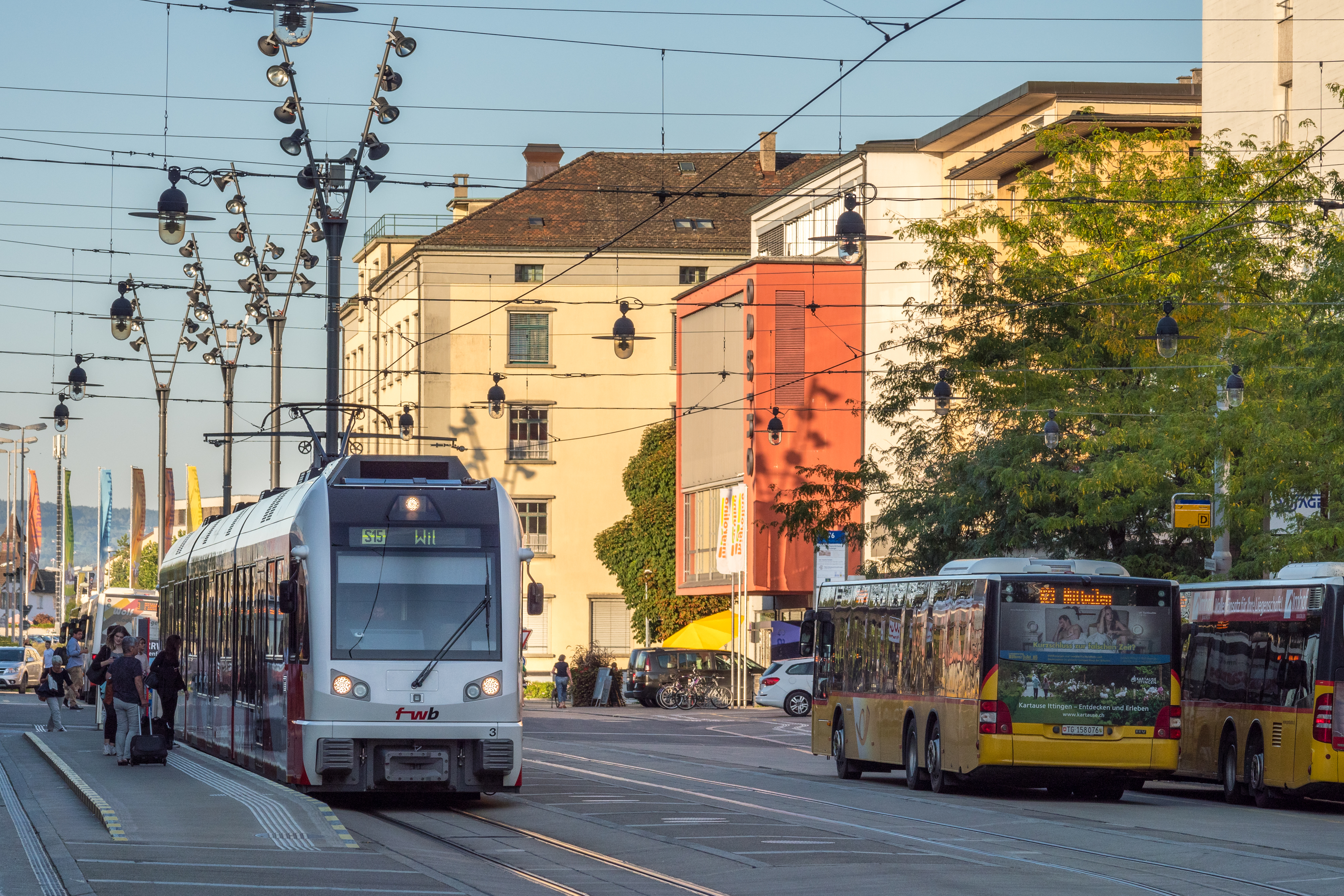
Station forecourt (Bahnhofplatz) with fwb train (S15) and Postauto buses in 2019

The station has an island platform and a side platform on the Winterthur–Romanshorn line, with tracks (Gleis) numbered 1–3. These tracks are used by InterCity (IC), InterRegio (IR) and most S-Bahn services. The Frauenfeld–Wil railway (S15) departs from the forecourt of the station (Bahnhofplatz), where a single side platform and track (Gleis 11) exist.

PostAuto Schweiz and Stadtbus Frauenfeld (operated by Bus Ostschweiz since December 2023) bus lines depart from the station forecourt.

== Services ==
As of the December 2023 timetable change, the following services call at Frauenfeld:

- InterCity / InterRegio:
  - / /: half-hourly service to Zürich HB; hourly service to Spiez, Lucerne, Romanshorn, and Konstanz; service every two hours to Brig and Interlaken Ost.
- Zurich S-Bahn
  - S23: peak-hour service between Zürich HB and Romanshorn via Zürich Stadelhofen.
  - S24 / S30: half-hourly service between Weinfelden and Winterthur and hourly service from Winterthur to Zug.
- St. Gallen S-Bahn
  - S15: half-hourly service to Wil SG via Wängi.

During weekends, Frauenfeld station is served by two nighttime S-Bahn services (SN15, SN30), offered by Ostwind tariff network, and operated by Appenzell Railways and Thurbo for St. Gallen S-Bahn.

- St. Gallen S-Bahn:
  - SN15: hourly service to Wil (via Wängi).
  - SN30: hourly service to Winterthur and to Romanshorn (via Weinfelden).

== See also ==
- Rail transport in Switzerland
