= Märwil railway station =

Train station in Switzerland

Märwil
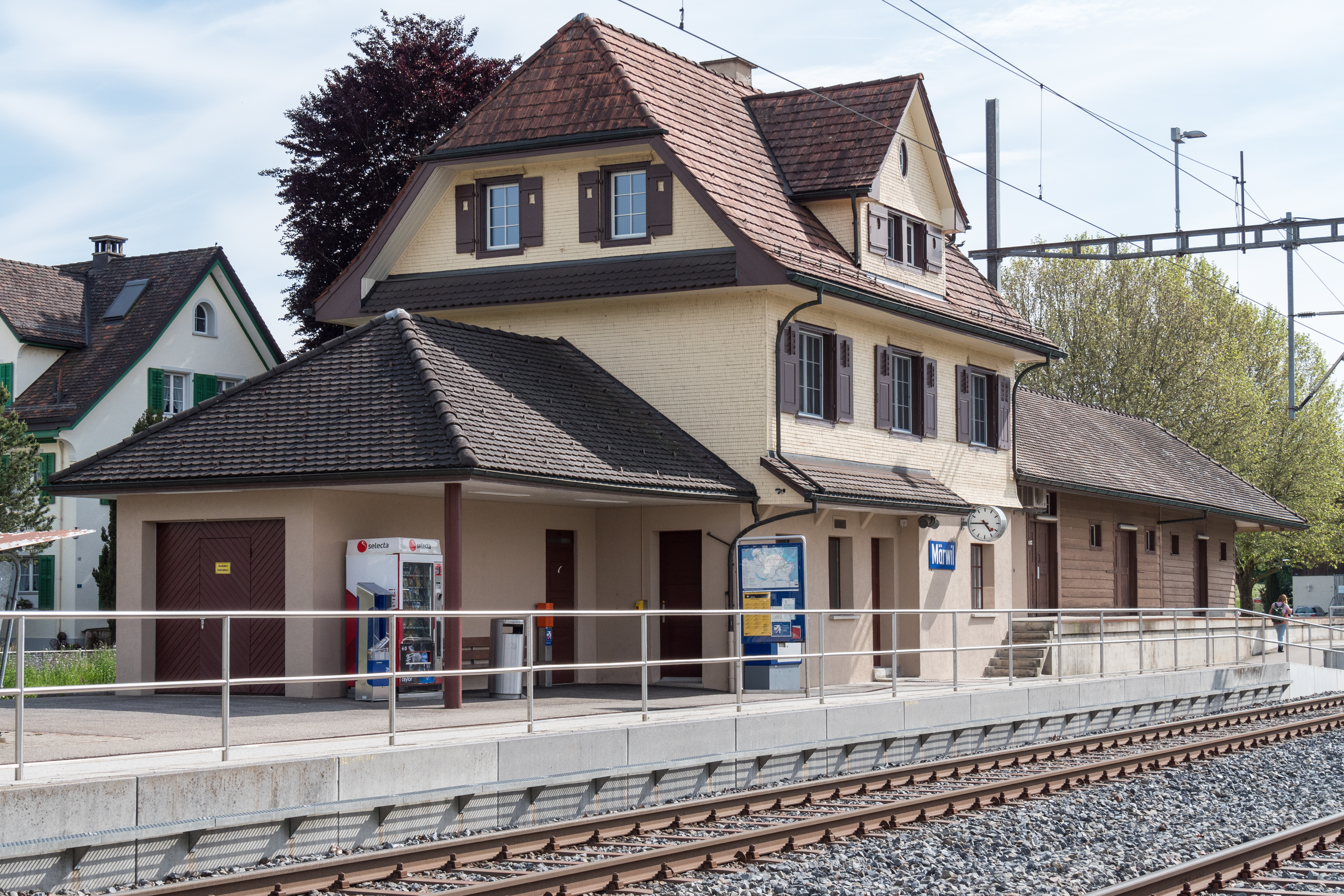
- The station building in 2019

General information
- Location: Affeltrangen; Switzerland
- Coordinates: 47°31′59″N 9°04′08″E
- Elevation: 506 m (1,660 ft)
- Owner: Thurbo
- Line: Wil–Kreuzlingen line
- Distance: 11.3 km (7.0 mi) from Wil
- Train operators: Thurbo

Other information
- Fare zone: 919 (Tarifverbund Ostwind)

Passengers
- 2018: 240 per weekday

Services
Preceding station	St. Gallen S-Bahn	Following station
Tobel-Affeltrangen towards Wil	S10	Oppikon towards Romanshorn
Location
- Location within Switzerland Location within Canton of Thurgau

Märwil railway station (German: Bahnhof Märwil) is a railway station in the village of Märwil, within the municipality of Affeltrangen, in the Swiss canton of Thurgau. It is an intermediate stop on the standard gauge Wil–Kreuzlingen line of Thurbo, and is served as a request stop by local trains only.

== Services ==
The following services stop at Märwil:

- St. Gallen S-Bahn S10: half-hourly service between Wil and Romanshorn, via Weinfelden.

== See also ==
- Rail transport in Switzerland
