= Tobel =

Tobel is a German word meaning gorge, and may refer to:

== People ==
- Alexa von Tobel (born 1984), American entrepreneur
- Laurent Tobel (born 1975), French figure skater

== Places ==
- Tobel, Thurgau, Switzerland
- Tobel-Tägerschen, Switzerland
