= Tägerschen railway station =

Train station in Switzerland

Tägerschen
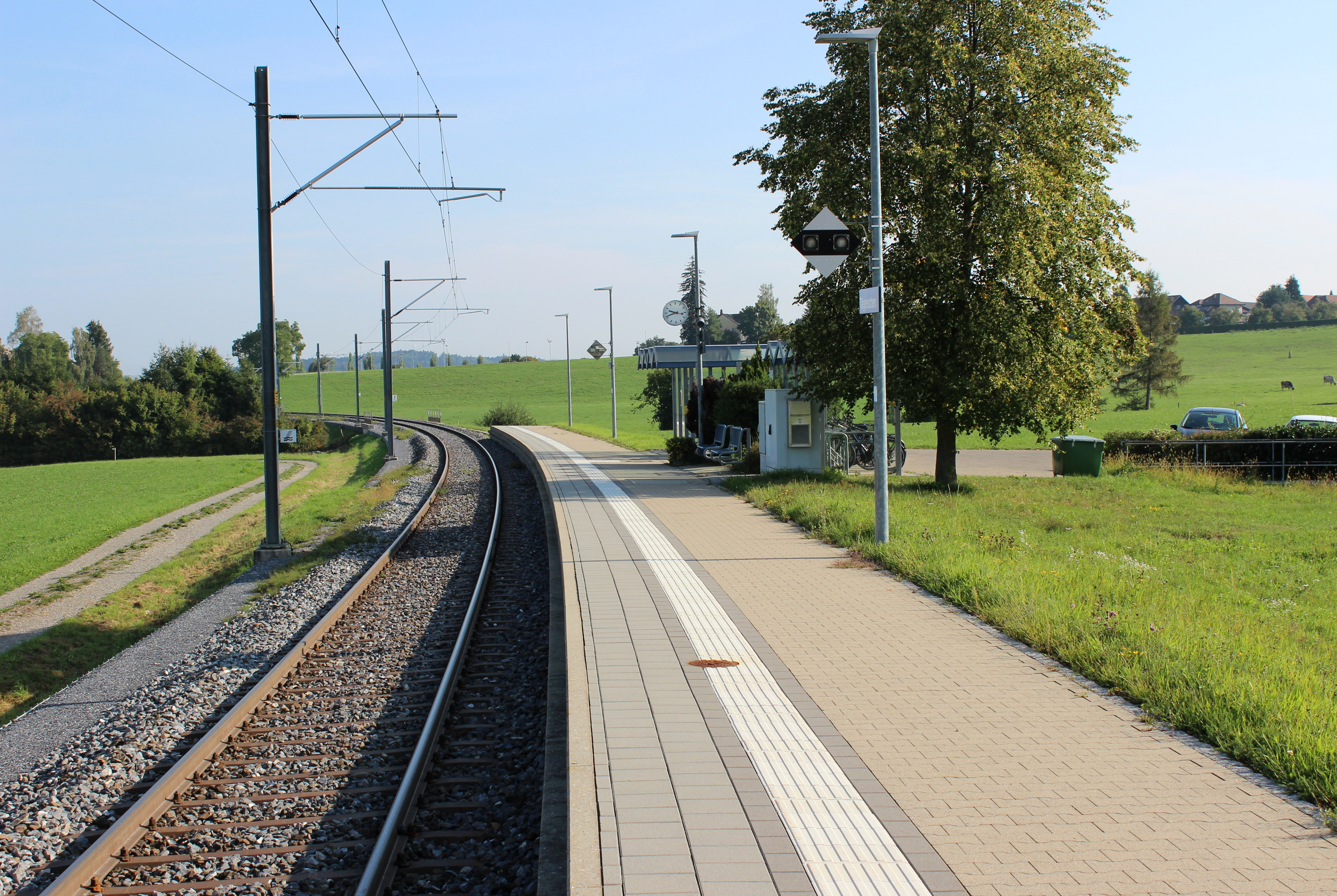
- The platform and shelter in 2018

General information
- Location: Tobel-Tägerschen; Switzerland
- Coordinates: 47°30′34″N 9°01′29″E
- Elevation: 532 m (1,745 ft)
- Owner: Thurbo
- Line: Wil–Kreuzlingen
- Distance: 6.7 km (4.2 mi) from Wil
- Train operators: Thurbo

Other information
- Fare zone: 919 (Tarifverbund Ostwind)

Passengers
- 2018: 120 per weekday

Services
Preceding station	St. Gallen S-Bahn	Following station
Bettwiesen towards Wil	S10	Tobel-Affeltrangen towards Romanshorn
Location
- Location within Switzerland Location within Canton of Thurgau

Tägerschen railway station (German: Bahnhof Tägerschen) is a railway station in the village of Tägerschen, part of the municipality of Tobel-Tägerschen, in the Swiss canton of Thurgau. It is an intermediate stop on the standard gauge Wil–Kreuzlingen line of Thurbo, and is served as a request stop by local trains only.

== Services ==
The following services stop at Tägerschen:

- St. Gallen S-Bahn S10: half-hourly service between Wil and Romanshorn, via Weinfelden.

== See also ==
- Rail transport in Switzerland
