= Bettwiesen =

- Municipality
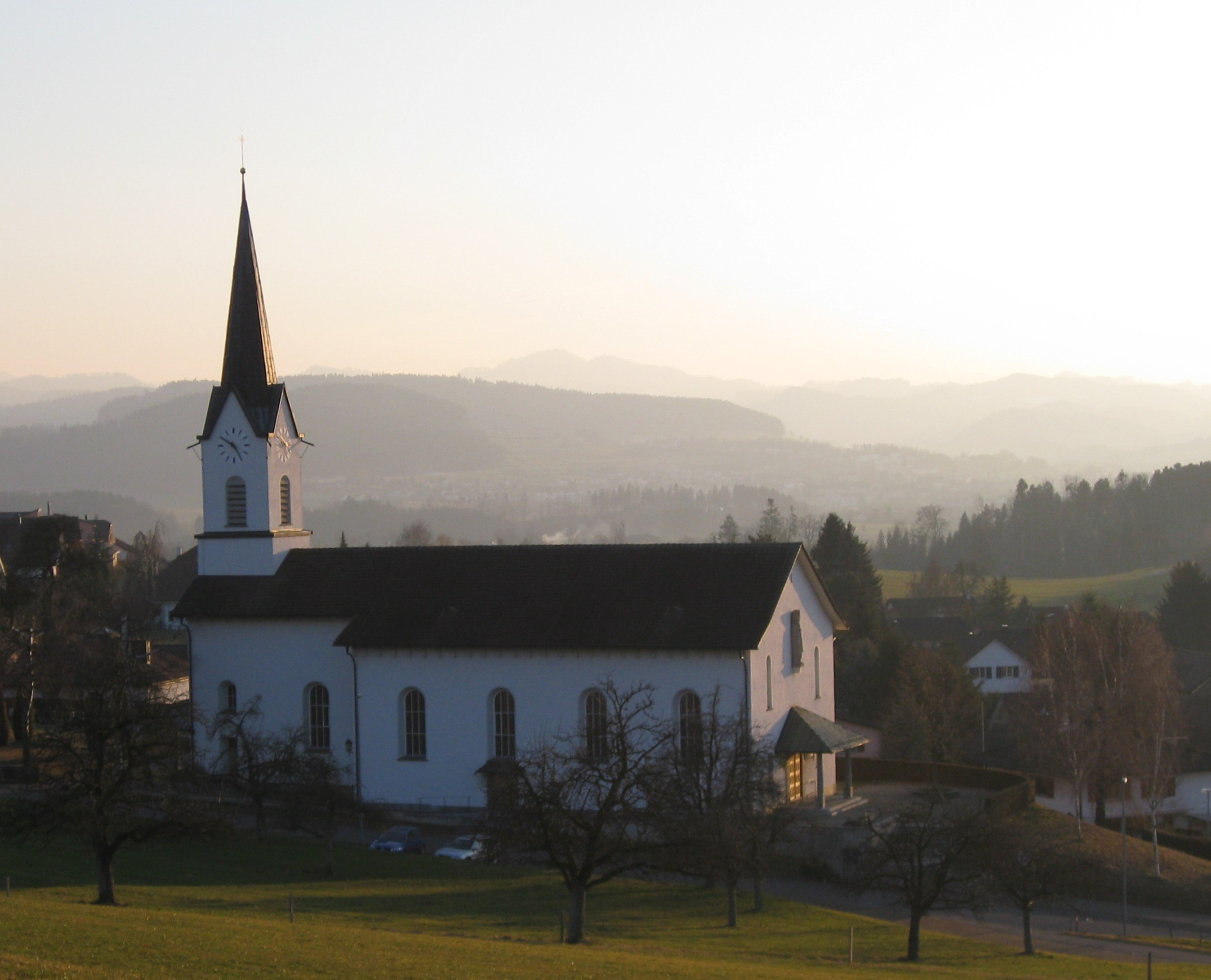

- Coat of arms
- Location of Bettwiesen
- Location within Switzerland Location within Canton of Thurgau
- Coordinates: 47°30′N 9°2′E
- Country: Switzerland
- Canton: Thurgau
- District: Münchwilen

Area
  - Total: 3.85 km^{2} (1.49 sq mi)
- Elevation: 550 m (1,800 ft)

Population (December 2007)
  - Total: 1,046
  - Density: 272/km^{2} (704/sq mi)
- Time zone: UTC+01:00 (CET)
  - Summer (DST): UTC+02:00 (CEST)
- Postal code: 9553
- SFOS number: 4716
- ISO 3166 code: CH-TG
- Surrounded by: Bronschhofen (SG), Lommis, Münchwilen, Tobel-Tägerschen, Wängi
- Website: www.bettwiesen.ch

Bettwiesen is a municipality in the district of Münchwilen in the canton of Thurgau in Switzerland.

== History ==
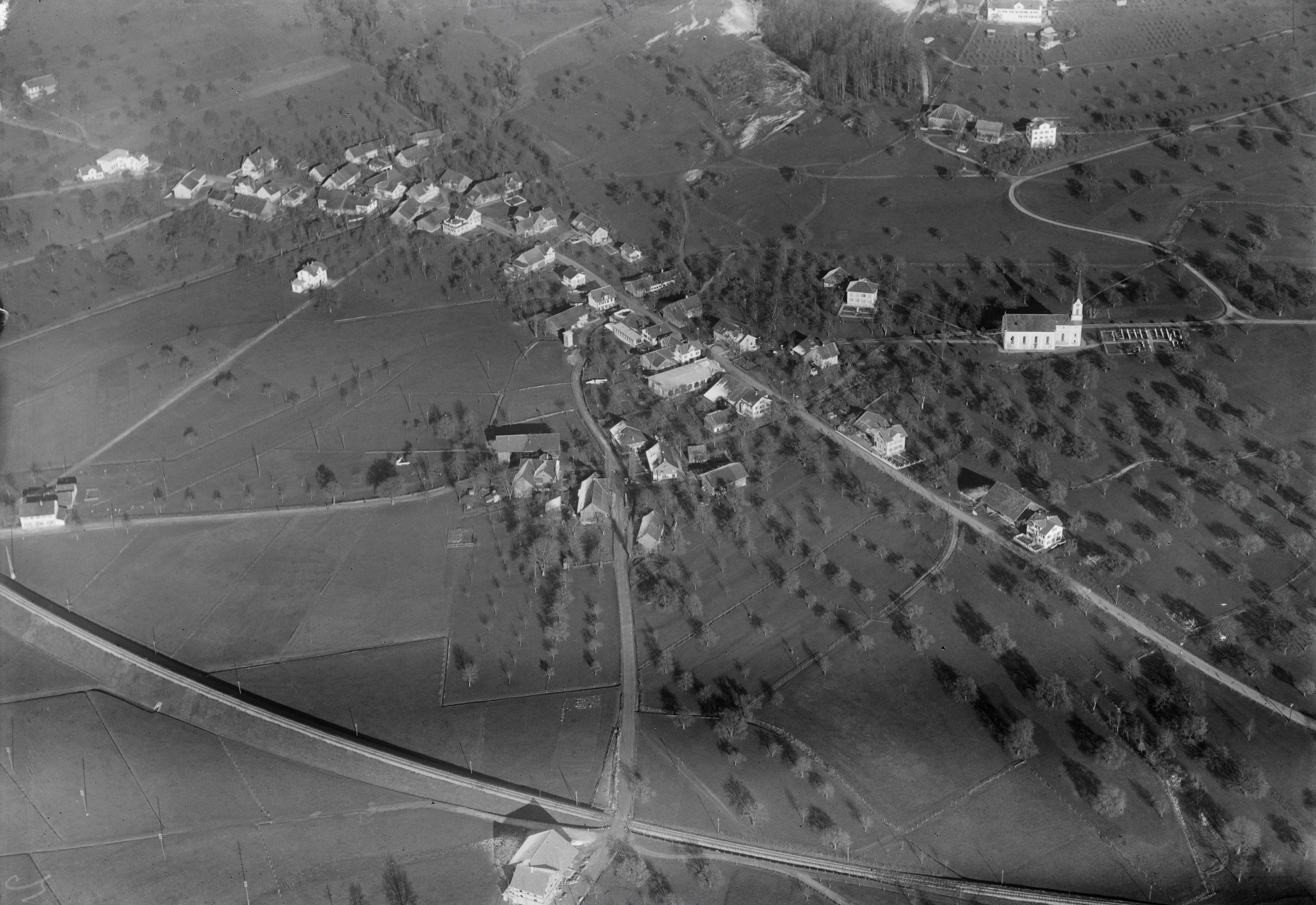
Aerial view from 400 m by Walter Mittelholzer (1923)

Bettwiesen is first mentioned in 868 as Petterwison. During the Middle Ages it belonged to the Prince-Bishop of Constance's Tannegg district. In 1693 the entire district went to the monastery of Fischingen. The monastery had, since the Late Middle Ages, owned land in Bettwiesen and had built a castle in 1627.

St. Mary's Chapel in Bettwiesen was first mentioned in 1275 and was part of the parish of Wil under the monastery. The village converted to the new faith during the Protestant Reformation in 1530, but converted back to the Catholic faith during the Counter-Reformation in 1542. The Reformed population became part of the parish of Sirnach, and later (probably in the 18th century) the Affeltrangen parish. In 1646, the village split from the Wil parish to form a new, catholic parish.

Farmland and vineyards were replaced in 1900 by the livestock industry (1870 a cattle bank opened and in 1889 a dairy). After 1900, an embroidery factory and later a shoe factory (1936–79) opened in the village. In 1942, a galvanizing plant opened (in 1964, it had 235 employees). In 1990, 52% of workers worked in manufacturing, while 35% worked in the services sector.

== Geography ==
Bettwiesen has an area, as of 2009, of 3.85 square kilometers (1.49 sq mi). Of this area, 2.43 km^{2} (0.94 sq mi) or 63.1% is used for agricultural purposes, while 0.88 km^{2} (0.34 sq mi) or 22.9% is forested. Of the rest of the land, 0.53 km^{2} (0.20 sq mi) or 13.8% is settled (buildings or roads), 0.01 km^{2} (2.5 acres) or 0.3% is either rivers or lakes.

Of the built up area, industrial buildings made up 7.3% of the total area while housing and buildings made up 1.0% and transportation infrastructure made up 0.3%. while parks, green belts and sports fields made up 4.9%. Out of the forested land, 21.3% of the total land area is heavily forested and 1.6% is covered with orchards or small clusters of trees. Of the agricultural land, 58.2% is used for growing crops, while 4.9% is used for orchards or vine crops. All the water in the municipality is flowing water.

The municipality is located in the Münchwilen district. It consists of the linear village of Bettwiesen.

== Demographics ==
Bettwiesen has a population (as of December 2020) of 1,228 As of 2008, 19.0% of the population are foreign nationals. Over the last 10 years (1997–2007) the population has changed at a rate of 0.5%. Most of the population (as of 2000) speaks German(85.9%), with Italian being second most common ( 4.5%) and Albanian being third ( 4.1%).

As of 2008, the gender distribution of the population was 51.7% male and 48.3% female. The population was made up of 442 Swiss men (41.7% of the population), and 107 (10.1%) non-Swiss men. There were 417 Swiss women (39.3%), and 95 (9.0%) non-Swiss women.

In 2008 there were 4 live births to Swiss citizens and 2 births to non-Swiss citizens, and in same time span there were 4 deaths of Swiss citizens and 1 non-Swiss citizen death. Ignoring immigration and emigration, the population of Swiss citizens remained the same while the foreign population increased by 1. There was 1 Swiss man, 3 Swiss women who emigrated from Switzerland to another country, 4 non-Swiss men who emigrated from Switzerland to another country and 2 non-Swiss women who emigrated from Switzerland to another country. The total Swiss population change in 2008 (from all sources) was an increase of 13 and the non-Swiss population change was an increase of 1 people. This represents a population growth rate of 1.3%.

The age distribution, as of 2009, in Bettwiesen is; 90 children or 8.5% of the population are between 0 and 9 years old and 155 teenagers or 14.7% are between 10 and 19. Of the adult population, 148 people or 14.0% of the population are between 20 and 29 years old. 128 people or 12.1% are between 30 and 39, 211 people or 20.0% are between 40 and 49, and 157 people or 14.9% are between 50 and 59. The senior population distribution is 79 people or 7.5% of the population are between 60 and 69 years old, 48 people or 4.6% are between 70 and 79, there are 34 people or 3.2% who are between 80 and 89, and there are 4 people or 0.4% who are 90 and older.

As of 2000, there were 369 private households in the municipality, and an average of 2.7 persons per household. In 2000 there were 141 single family homes (or 78.8% of the total) out of a total of 179 inhabited buildings. There were 14 two family buildings (7.8%), 3 three family buildings (1.7%) and 21 multi-family buildings (or 11.7%). There were 175 (or 17.2%) persons who were part of a couple without children, and 689 (or 67.8%) who were part of a couple with children. There were 30 (or 3.0%) people who lived in single parent home, while there are 4 persons who were adult children living with one or both parents, 4 persons who lived in a household made up of relatives, 6 who lived in a household made up of unrelated persons, and 6 who are either institutionalized or live in another type of collective housing.

The vacancy rate for the municipality, in 2008, was 4.56%. As of 2007, the construction rate of new housing units was 9.6 new units per 1000 residents. In 2000 there were 420 apartments in the municipality. The most common apartment size was the 4 room apartment of which there were 120. There were 12 single room apartments and 71 apartments with six or more rooms. As of 2000 the average price to rent an average apartment in Bettwiesen was 943.04 Swiss francs (CHF) per month (US$750, £420, €600 approx. exchange rate from 2000). The average rate for a one-room apartment was 408.60 CHF (US$330, £180, €260), a two-room apartment was about 655.38 CHF (US$520, £290, €420), a three-room apartment was about 730.92 CHF (US$580, £330, €470) and a six or more room apartment cost an average of 2221.43 CHF (US$1780, £1000, €1420). The average apartment price in Bettwiesen was 84.5% of the national average of 1116 CHF.

In the 2007 federal election the most popular party was the SVP which received 48.38% of the vote. The next three most popular parties were the CVP (25.45%), the FDP (7.73%) and the SP (6.65%). In the federal election, a total of 332 votes were cast, and the voter turnout was 49.9%.

The historical population is given in the following table:

year	population
1850	296
1900	332
1950	409
1980	747
1990	986
2000	1,016

== Heritage sites of national significance ==
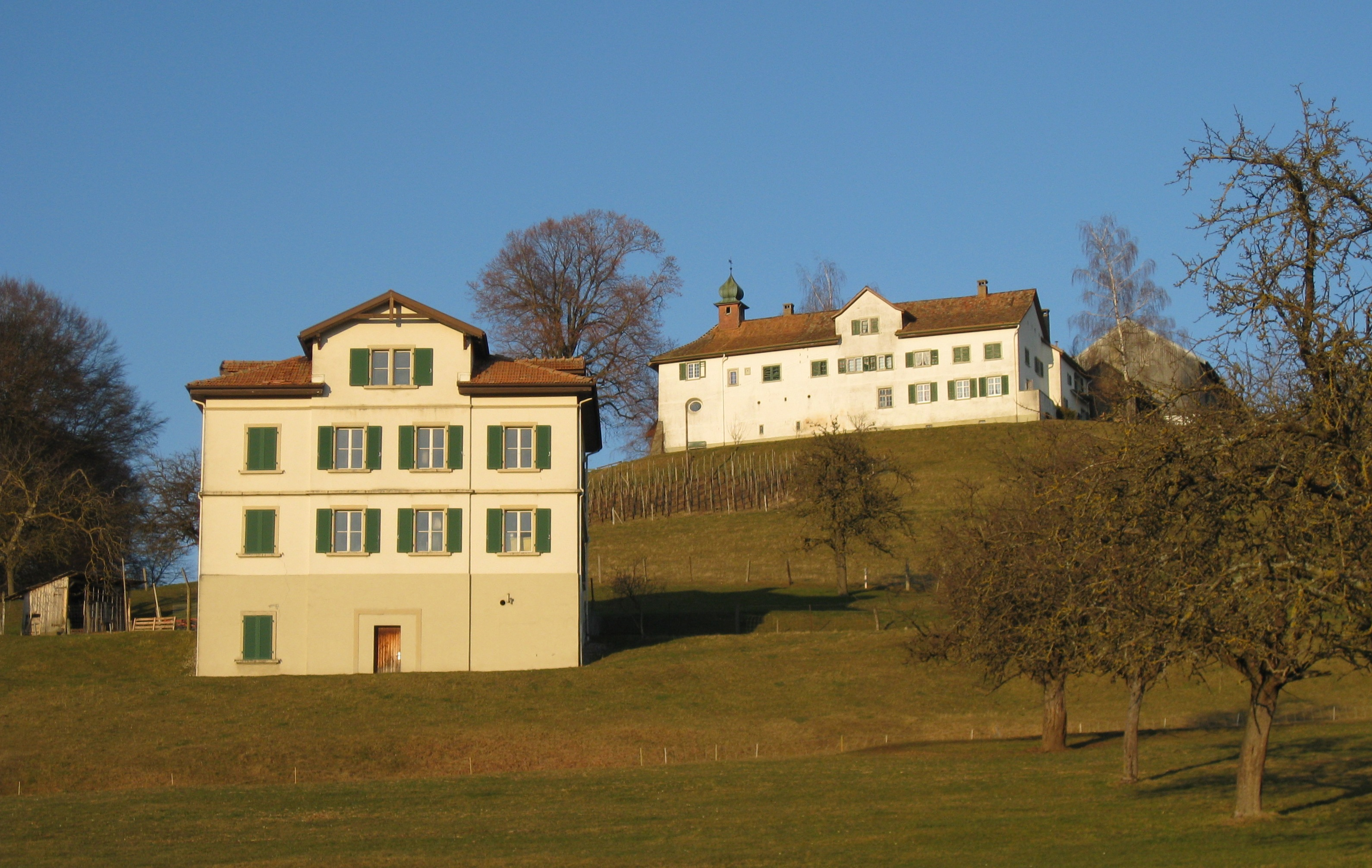
Lower Castle of Bettwiesen Castle

Bettwiesen Castle is listed as a Swiss heritage site of national significance.

== Economy ==
As of 2007, Bettwiesen had an unemployment rate of 2.13%. As of 2005, there were 41 people employed in the primary economic sector and about 17 businesses involved in this sector. 39 people are employed in the secondary sector and there are 9 businesses in this sector. 102 people are employed in the tertiary sector, with 24 businesses in this sector. In 2000 there were 688 workers who lived in the municipality. Of these, 358 or about 52.0% of the residents worked outside Bettwiesen while 90 people commuted into the municipality for work. There were a total of 420 jobs (of at least 6 hours per week) in the municipality. Of the working population, 9.6% used public transportation to get to work, and 54% used a private car.

== Religion ==
From the 2000 census, 567 or 55.8% were Roman Catholic, while 227 or 22.3% belonged to the Swiss Reformed Church. Of the rest of the population, there are 32 individuals (or about 3.15% of the population) who belong to the Orthodox Church, and there are 12 individuals (or about 1.18% of the population) who belong to another Christian church. There were 86 (or about 8.46% of the population) who are Islamic. There was 1 individual (or about 0.10% of the population) who belonged to another church (not listed on the census), 51 (or about 5.02% of the population) belong to no church, are agnostic or atheist, and 40 individuals (or about 3.94% of the population) did not answer the question.

== Transport ==
Bettwiesen sits on the Wil–Kreuzlingen line between Wil and Weinfelden and is served by the St. Gallen S-Bahn at Bettwiesen railway station.

== Education ==
The entire Swiss population is generally well educated. In Bettwiesen about 67.2% of the population (between age 25-64) have completed either non-mandatory upper secondary education or additional higher education (either university or a Fachhochschule).

Bettwiesen is home to the Bettwiesen primary school district. In the 2008/2009 school year there were 99 students. There were 22 children in the kindergarten, and the average class size was 22 kindergartners. Of the children in kindergarten, 10 or 45.5% were female, 4 or 18.2% were not Swiss citizens and 4 or 18.2% did not speak German natively. The lower and upper primary levels begin at about age 5-6 and last for 6 years. There were 34 children in who were at the lower primary level and 43 children in the upper primary level. The average class size in the primary school was 19.25 students. At the lower primary level, there were 14 children or 41.2% of the total population who were female, 7 or 20.6% were not Swiss citizens and 7 or 20.6% did not speak German natively. In the upper primary level, there were 18 or 41.9% who were female, 9 or 20.9% were not Swiss citizens and 6 or 14.0% did not speak German natively.
