= Affeltrangen =

- Municipality
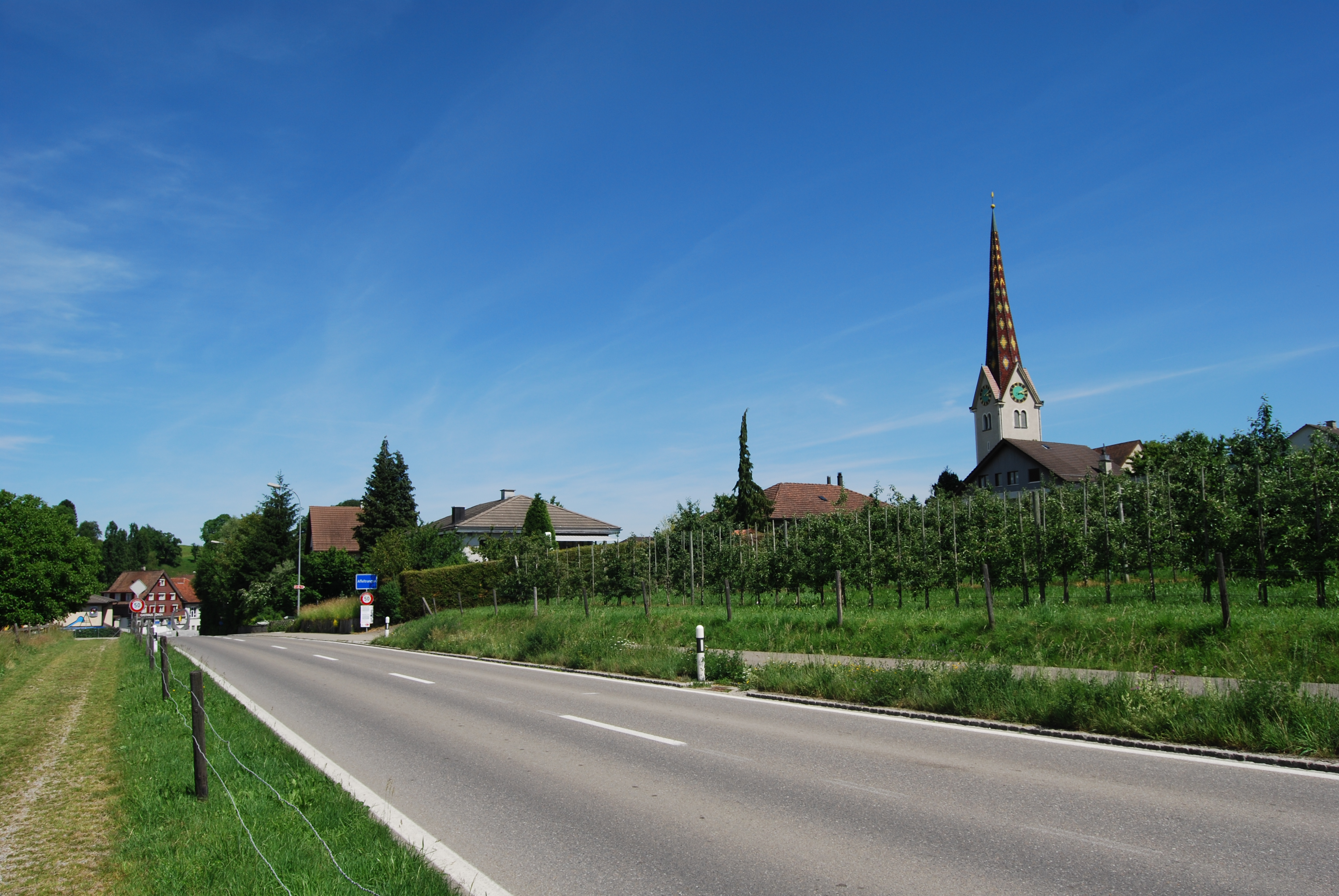

- Coat of arms
- Location of Affeltrangen
- Location within Switzerland Location within Canton of Thurgau
- Coordinates: 47°31′N 9°1′E
- Country: Switzerland
- Canton: Thurgau
- District: Münchwilen

Area
  - Total: 14.42 km^{2} (5.57 sq mi)
- Elevation: 489 m (1,604 ft)

Population (December 2007)
  - Total: 2,246
  - Density: 155.8/km^{2} (403.4/sq mi)
- Time zone: UTC+01:00 (CET)
  - Summer (DST): UTC+02:00 (CEST)
- Postal code: 9556
- SFOS number: 4711
- ISO 3166 code: CH-TG
- Localities: Affeltrangen, Azenwilen, Battlehausen, Bohl, Bollsteg, Breite, Buch bei Märwil, Ghürst, Himmenreich, Isenegg, Kaltenbrunnen, Kreuzegg, Langnau, Maltbach, Märwil, Nägelishub, Rüti, Zezikon
- Surrounded by: Amlikon-Bissegg, Braunau, Bussnang, Lommis, Thundorf, Tobel-Tägerschen
- Website: www.affeltrangen.ch

Affeltrangen is a municipality in the district of Münchwilen in the canton of Thurgau in Switzerland.

== History ==
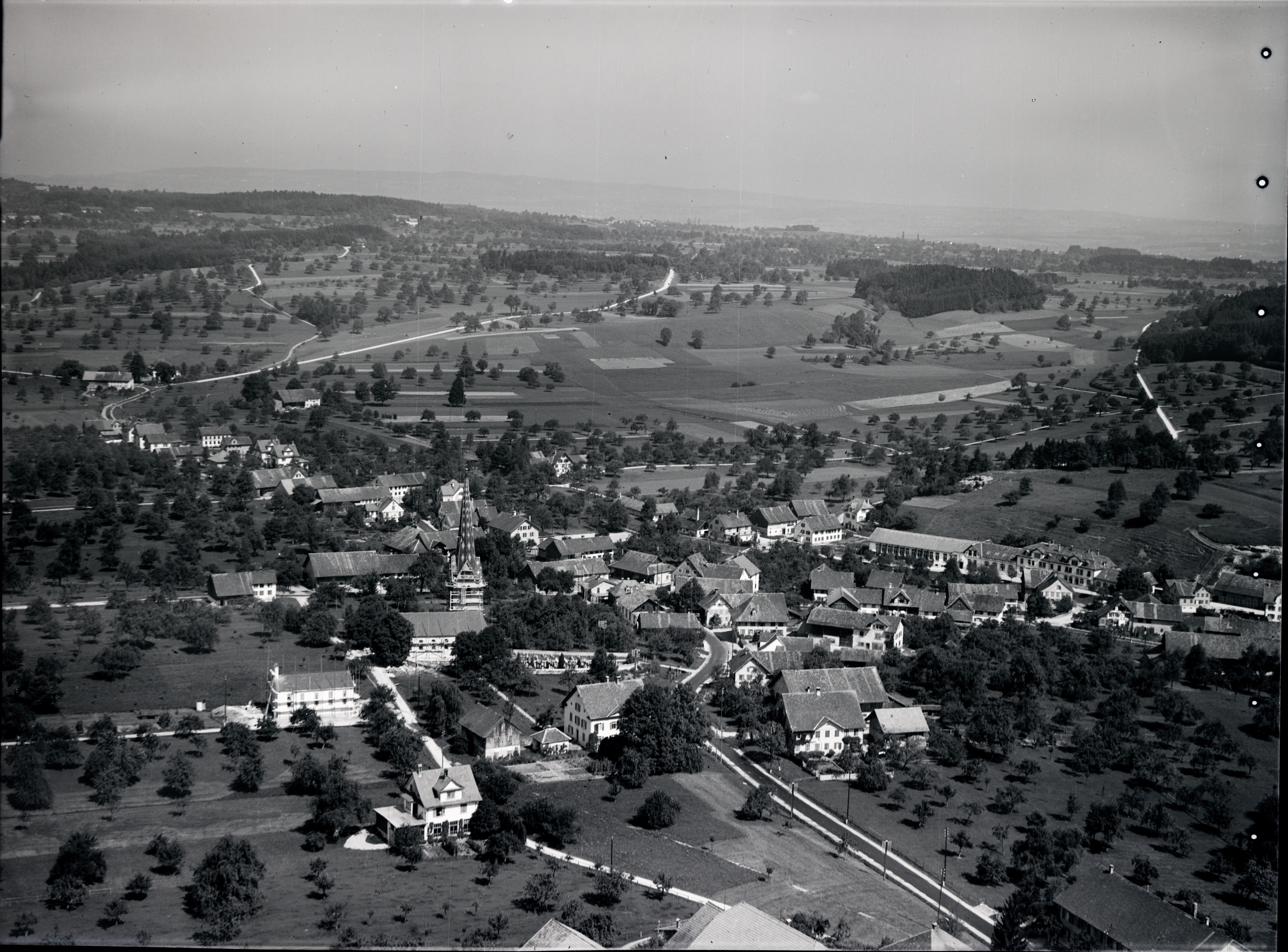
Aerial view by Walter Mittelholzer (1934)

Affeltrangen is first mentioned in 779 as Affaltrawangas. In 1995 Affeltrangen merged with Buch bei Märwil, Märwil and Zezikon.

In the 8th and 9th Centuries, the Abbey of St. Gall acquired property in Affeltragen. In 1228 the Commandry of Tobel acquired the entire village, which was part of the court of Tobel from about 1280 until 1798.

== Geography ==
Affeltrangen has an area, as of 2009, of 14.42 square kilometers (5.57 sq mi). Of this area, 10.58 km^{2} (4.08 sq mi) or 73.4% is used for agricultural purposes, while 2.25 km^{2} (0.87 sq mi) or 15.6% is forested. Of the rest of the land, 1.32 km^{2} (0.51 sq mi) or 9.2% is settled (buildings or roads), 0.08 km^{2} (20 acres) or 0.6% is either rivers or lakes and 0.13 km^{2} (32 acres) or 0.9% is unproductive land.

Of the built up area, industrial buildings made up 4.7% of the total area while housing and buildings made up 0.6% and transportation infrastructure made up 0.3%. while parks, green belts and sports fields made up 3.4%. Out of the forested land, 13.1% of the total land area is heavily forested and 2.5% is covered with orchards or small clusters of trees. Of the agricultural land, 65.4% is used for growing crops, while 8.0% is used for orchards or vine crops. All the water in the municipality is in lakes. Of the unproductive areas, and .

The municipality is located in the Münchwilen district, located in the upper Lauchetal (Lauch Valley). It consists of the villages of Affeltrangen, Buch bei Märwil, Märwil and Zezikon. Affeltragen consists of the hamlets of Affeltragen, Bollsteg, Isenegg, Kreuzegg, Nägelishub and Rüti.

== Demographics ==
Affeltrangen has a population (as of December 2020) of 2,648. As of 2008, 11.8% of the population are foreign nationals. Over the last 10 years (1997–2007) the population has changed at a rate of 12%. Most of the population (as of 2000) speaks German (91.8%), with Italian being second most common ( 2.5%) and Albanian being third ( 1.9%).

As of 2008, the gender distribution of the population was 52.1% male and 47.9% female. The population was made up of 1,050 Swiss men (45.9% of the population), and 142 (6.2%) non-Swiss men. There were 967 Swiss women (42.3%), and 127 (5.6%) non-Swiss women.

In 2008 there were 29 live births to Swiss citizens and 2 births to non-Swiss citizens, and in same time span there were 22 deaths of Swiss citizens and 1 non-Swiss citizen death. Ignoring immigration and emigration, the population of Swiss citizens increased by 7 while the foreign population increased by 1. There were 3 Swiss men who emigrated from Switzerland to another country, 7 non-Swiss men who emigrated from Switzerland to another country and 11 non-Swiss women who emigrated from Switzerland to another country. The total Swiss population change in 2008 (from all sources) was an increase of 27 and the non-Swiss population change was an increase of 8 people. This represents a population growth rate of 1.6%.

The age distribution, as of 2009, in Affeltrangen is; 264 children or 11.5% of the population are between 0 and 9 years old and 303 teenagers or 13.2% are between 10 and 19. Of the adult population, 312 people or 13.6% of the population are between 20 and 29 years old. 272 people or 11.9% are between 30 and 39, 406 people or 17.7% are between 40 and 49, and 330 people or 14.4% are between 50 and 59. The senior population distribution is 211 people or 9.2% of the population are between 60 and 69 years old, 118 people or 5.2% are between 70 and 79, there are 63 people or 2.8% who are between 80 and 89, and there are 9 people or 0.4% who are 90 and older.

As of 2000, there were 789 private households in the municipality, and an average of 2.7 persons per household. In 2000 there were 320 single family homes (or 81.4% of the total) out of a total of 393 inhabited buildings. There were 29 two family buildings (7.4%), 18 three family buildings (4.6%) and 26 multi-family buildings (or 6.6%). There were 428 (or 20.0%) persons who were part of a couple without children, and 1,312 (or 61.5%) who were part of a couple with children. There were 113 (or 5.3%) people who lived in single parent home, while there are 18 persons who were adult children living with one or both parents, 6 persons who lived in a household made up of relatives, 31 who lived in a household made up of unrelated persons, and 27 who are either institutionalized or live in another type of collective housing.

The vacancy rate for the municipality, in 2008, was 3.45%. As of 2007, the construction rate of new housing units was 4 new units per 1000 residents. In 2000 there were 849 apartments in the municipality. The most common apartment size was the 6 room apartment of which there were 226. There were 16 single room apartments and 226 apartments with six or more rooms. As of 2000 the average price to rent an average apartment in Affeltrangen was 1032.70 Swiss francs (CHF) per month (US$830, £460, €660 approx. exchange rate from 2000). The average rate for a one-room apartment was 530.50 CHF (US$420, £240, €340), a two-room apartment was about 666.62 CHF (US$530, £300, €430), a three-room apartment was about 828.50 CHF (US$660, £370, €530) and a six or more room apartment cost an average of 1851.58 CHF (US$1480, £830, €1190). The average apartment price in Affeltrangen was 92.5% of the national average of 1116 CHF.

In the 2007 federal election the most popular party was the SVP which received 57.01% of the vote. The next three most popular parties were the CVP (11.64%), the Green Party (8.73%) and the FDP (8.03%). In the federal election, a total of 761 votes were cast, and the voter turnout was 49.4%.

The historical population is given in the following table:

year	population
1850	1,505
1880	1,228
1900	1,133
1950	1,484
1990	1,834
2000	2,135

== Economy ==
As of 2007, Affeltrangen had an unemployment rate of 1.37%. As of 2005, there were 163 people employed in the primary economic sector and about 64 businesses involved in this sector. 405 people are employed in the secondary sector and there are 48 businesses in this sector. 395 people are employed in the tertiary sector, with 75 businesses in this sector.

In 2000 there were 1,510 workers who lived in the municipality. Of these, 665 or about 44.0% of the residents worked outside Affeltrangen while 364 people commuted into the municipality for work. There were a total of 1,209 jobs (of at least 6 hours per week) in the municipality. Of the working population, 7% used public transportation to get to work, and 49.1% used a private car.

== Religion ==
From the 2000 census, 765 or 35.8% were Roman Catholic, while 985 or 46.1% belonged to the Swiss Reformed Church. Of the rest of the population, there are 38 individuals (or about 1.78% of the population) who belong to the Orthodox Church, and there are 84 individuals (or about 3.93% of the population) who belong to another Christian church. There were 66 (or about 3.09% of the population) who are Islamic. There are 5 individuals (or about 0.23% of the population) who belong to another church (not listed on the census), 138 (or about 6.46% of the population) belong to no church, are agnostic or atheist, and 54 individuals (or about 2.53% of the population) did not answer the question.

== Transport ==
Affeltrangen sits on the Wil–Kreuzlingen line between Wil and Weinfelden and is served by the St. Gallen S-Bahn at Märwil railway station.

== Weather ==
Affeltrangen has an average of 133.3 days of rain or snow per year and on average receives 974 mm (38.3 in) of precipitation. The wettest month is June during which time Affeltrangen receives an average of 117 mm (4.6 in) of rain. During this month there is precipitation for an average of 12.6 days. The month with the most days of precipitation is May, with an average of 13.5, but with only 107 mm (4.2 in) of rain or snow. The driest month of the year is February with an average of 58 mm (2.3 in) of precipitation over 12.6 days.

== Education ==
In Affeltrangen about 72.5% of the population (between age 25–64) have completed either non-mandatory upper secondary education or additional higher education (either university or a Fachhochschule).
