= Bronschhofen railway station =

Train station in Switzerland

Bronschhofen
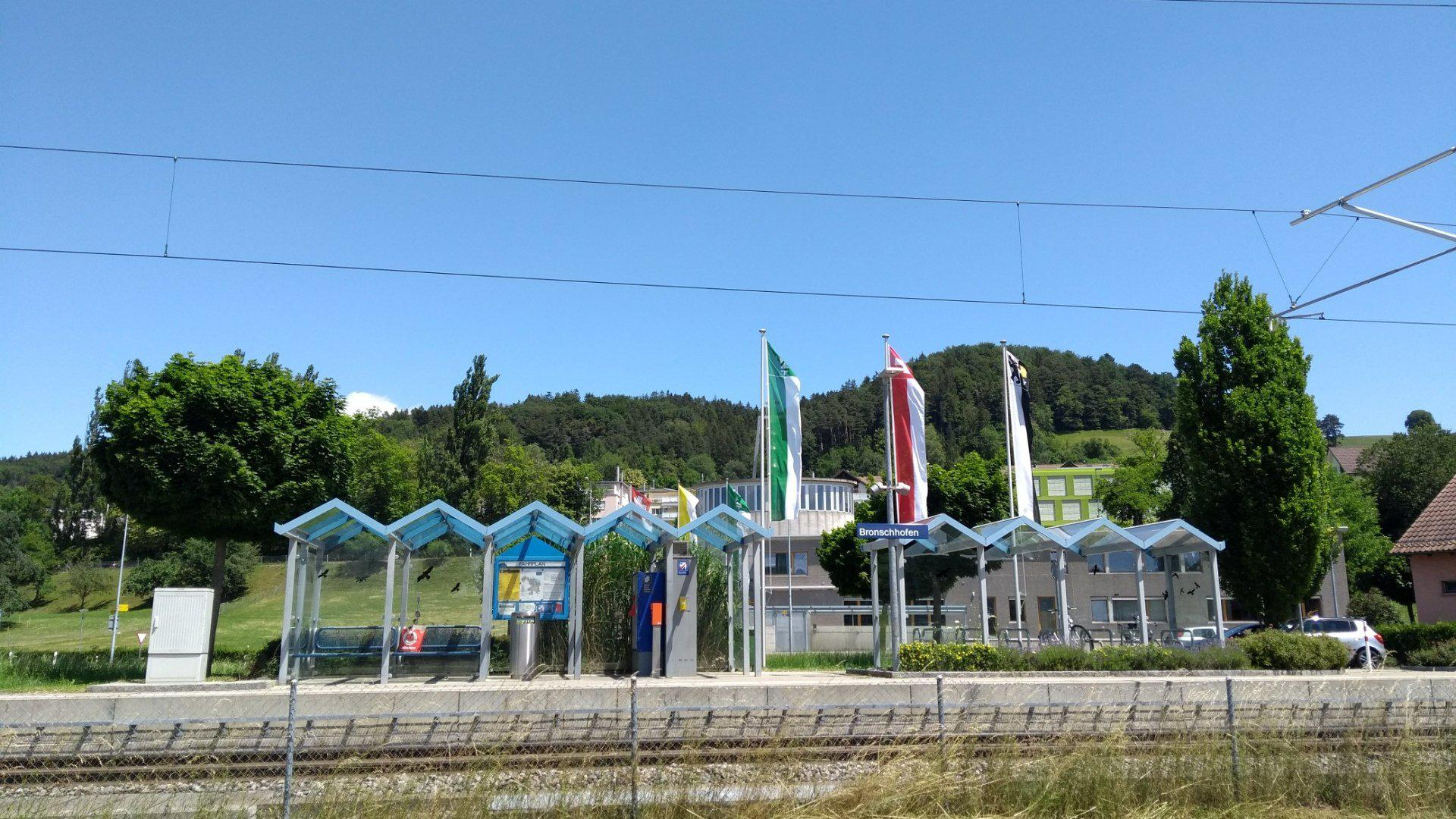
- The station platform in 2018

General information
- Location: Wil; Switzerland
- Coordinates: 47°28′30″N 9°02′06″E
- Elevation: 563 m (1,847 ft)
- Owner: Thurbo
- Line: Wil–Kreuzlingen
- Distance: 2.6 km (1.6 mi) from Wil
- Train operators: Thurbo

Other information
- Fare zone: 916 (Tarifverbund Ostwind)

Passengers
- 2018: 200 per weekday

Services
Preceding station	St. Gallen S-Bahn	Following station
Wil Terminus	S10	Bronschhofen AMP towards Romanshorn
Location
- Location within Switzerland Location within Canton of St. Gallen

Bronschhofen railway station (German: Bahnhof Bronschhofen) is a railway station in the village of Bronschhofen, part of the municipality of Wil, in the Swiss canton of St. Gallen. It is an intermediate stop on the standard gauge Wil–Kreuzlingen line of Thurbo. The station is a request stop.

== Services ==
The following services stop at Bronschhofen:

- St. Gallen S-Bahn S10: half-hourly service between Wil and Romanshorn, via Weinfelden.

== See also ==
- Rail transport in Switzerland
