= Buch bei Märwil =

Coordinates: 47°32′10.89″N 9°03′22.09″E

Buch bei Märwil is a village and former municipality in the district of Frauenfeld in the canton of Thurgau, Switzerland.

It was first recorded in 1228 as Buch. From 1819 to 1953 it was named Buch bei Affeltrangen.

The municipality also contained the villages Azenwilen and Bohl. It had 245 inhabitants in 1850, which decreased to 160 in 1900 and 152 in 1910. It then increased to 221 in 1950, but declined again to 140 in 1990.

In 1995 the municipality was incorporated into the larger, neighboring municipality Affeltrangen.
