= S10 (St. Gallen S-Bahn) =

Railway service in Switzerland

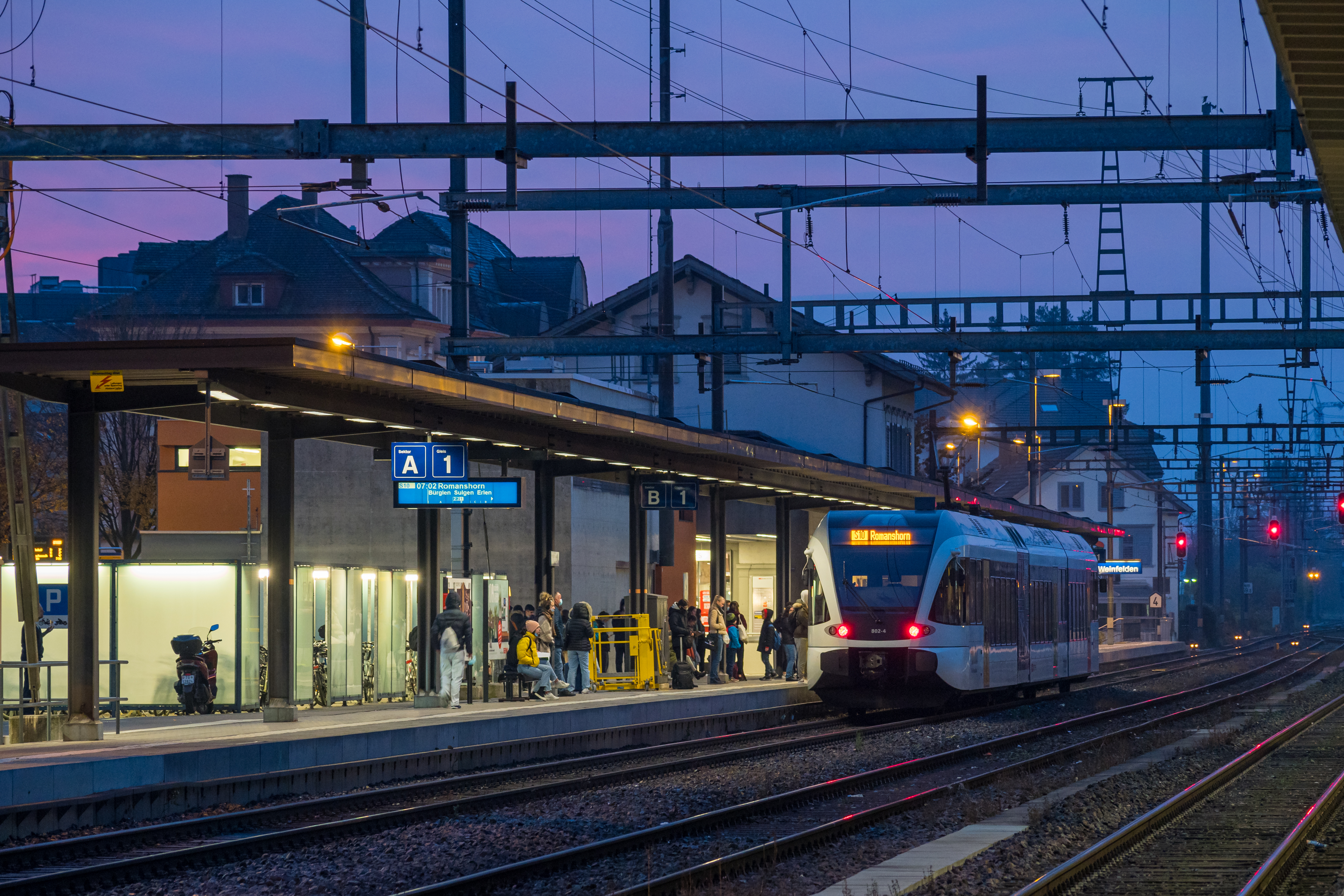
- A Romanshorn-bound S10 at Weinfelden in 2021

Overview
- First service: 15 December 2013
- Current operator(s): THURBO

Route
- Termini: Wil; Romanshorn
- Stops: 14
- Distance travelled: 41.9 kilometres (26.0 mi)
- Average journey time: 51 minutes
- Service frequency: Every 30 minutes
- Line(s) used: Wil–Kreuzlingen line; Winterthur–Romanshorn line

The S10 is a railway service of the St. Gallen S-Bahn that provides half-hourly service between Wil and Romanshorn over the Wil–Kreuzlingen and Winterthur–Romanshorn lines. The line is also part of the Bodensee S-Bahn. THURBO, a joint venture of Swiss Federal Railways and the canton of Thurgau, operates the service.

== Operation ==
The S10 operates every 30 minutes between Wil and Romanshorn, using the Wil–Kreuzlingen line between Wil and Weinfelden and the Winterthur–Romanshorn line between Weinfelden and Romanshorn. It is the only service between Wil and Weinfelden. Between Weinfelden and Romanshorn it is supplemented by long-distance services and the S7. On weekends, service is reduced to hourly.

== Route ==
S10 Wil SG – Weinfelden – Romanshorn

- Wil SG
- Bronschhofen (stops only on request)
- Bronschhofen AMP (stops only on request)
- Bettwiesen (stops only on request)
- Tägerschen (stops only on request)
- Tobel-Affeltrangen (stops only on request)
- Märwil (stops only on request)
- Oppikon (stops only on request)
- Bussnang (stops only on request)
- Weinfelden
- Bürglen
- Sulgen
- Erlen
- Oberaach
- Amriswil
- Romanshorn

== History ==
The December 2013 timetable change applied the S10 designation to an existing service between Wil and Weinfelden. It ran half-hourly on weekdays and hourly on weekends, and did not continue to Romanshorn. This changed in December 2018: the S10 was extended from Weinfelden to Romanshorn, making all local stops, and the S7 began running express over the route, stopping only at Amriswil.
