= Tobel-Affeltrangen railway station =

Train station in Switzerland

Tobel-Affeltrangen
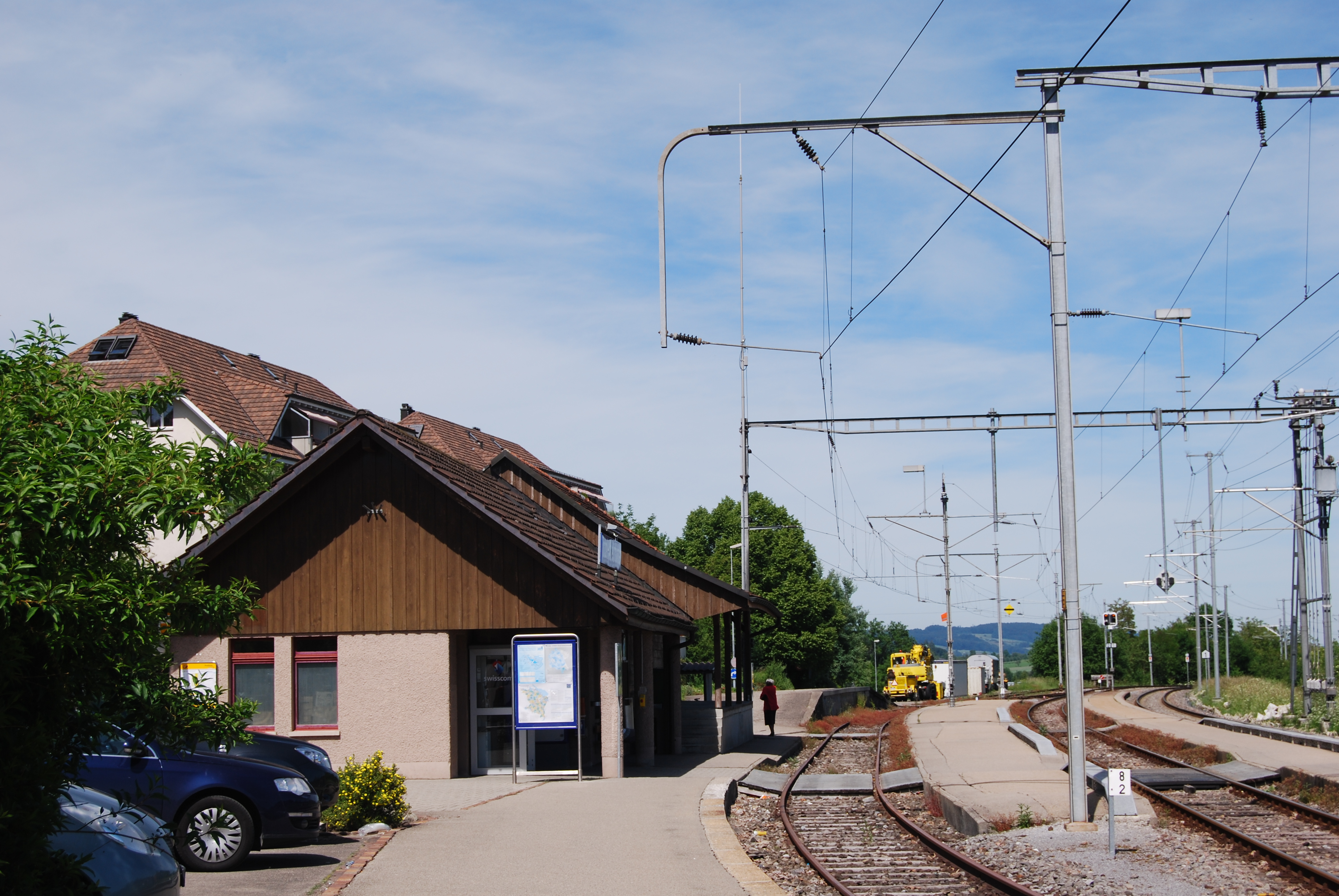
- The station building in 2011

General information
- Location: Tobel-Tägerschen; Switzerland
- Coordinates: 47°31′17″N 9°02′01″E
- Elevation: 511 m (1,677 ft)
- Owner: Thurbo
- Line: Wil–Kreuzlingen
- Distance: 8.2 km (5.1 mi) from Wil
- Train operators: Thurbo
- Connections: PostAuto Schweiz buses

Other information
- Fare zone: 919 (Tarifverbund Ostwind)

Passengers
- 2018: 280 per weekday

Services
Preceding station	St. Gallen S-Bahn	Following station
Tägerschen towards Wil	S10	Märwil towards Romanshorn
Location
- Location within Switzerland Location within Canton of Thurgau

Tobel-Affeltrangen railway station (German: Bahnhof Tobel-Affeltrangen) is a railway station in the municipality of Tobel-Tägerschen, in the Swiss canton of Thurgau. It is an intermediate stop on the standard gauge Wil–Kreuzlingen line of Thurbo, and is served as a request stop by local trains only.

== Services ==
The following services stop at Tobel-Affeltrangen:

- St. Gallen S-Bahn S10: half-hourly service between Wil and Romanshorn, via Weinfelden.

== See also ==
- Rail transport in Switzerland
