= Bussnang railway station =

Railway station in Switzerland

Bussnang
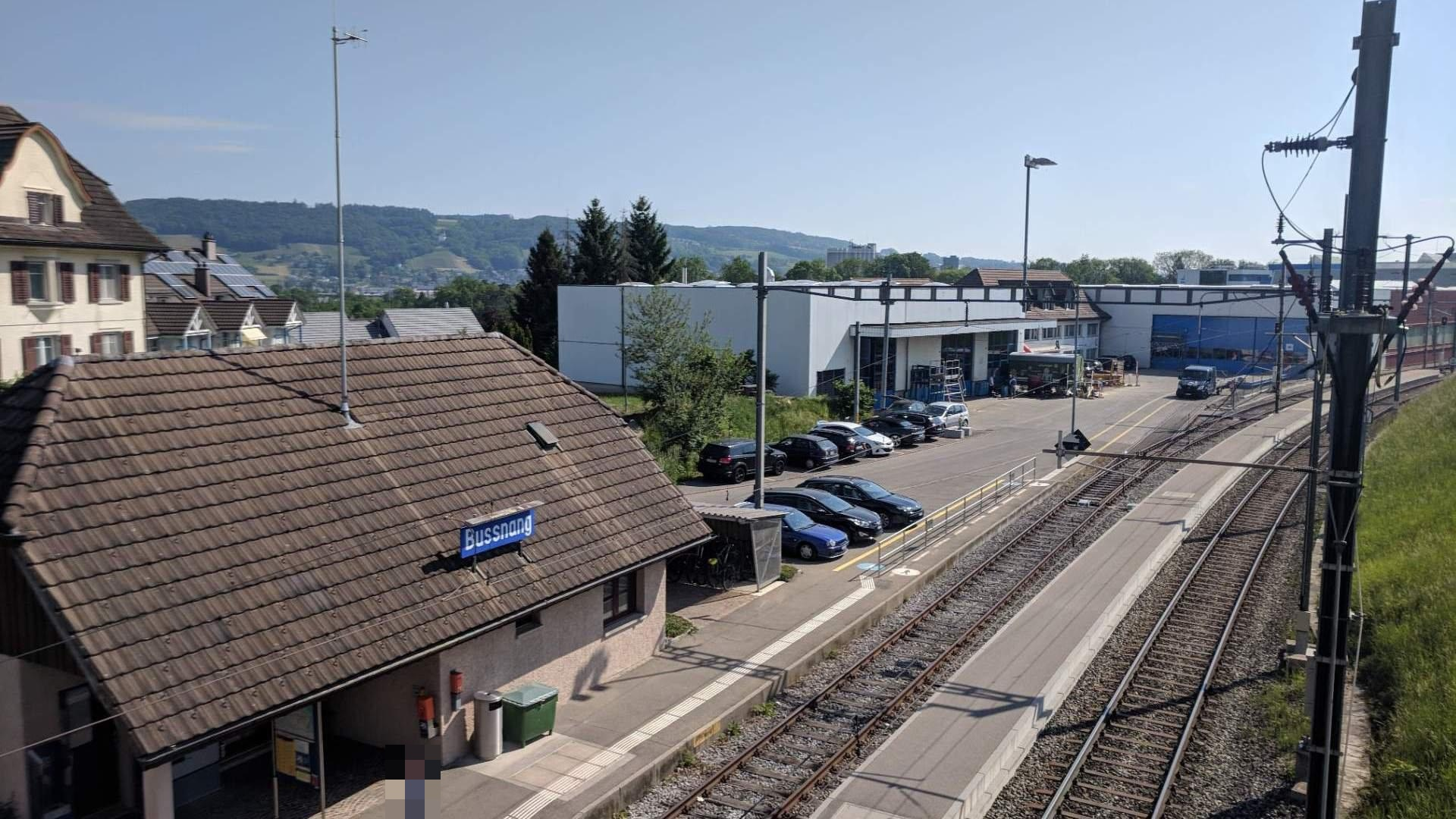
- The station in 2018 (Stadler Rail factory in the background)

General information
- Location: Bussnang; Switzerland
- Coordinates: 47°33′22″N 9°05′02″E
- Elevation: 444 m (1,457 ft)
- Owner: Thurbo
- Line: Wil–Kreuzlingen line
- Distance: 16.4 km (10.2 mi) from Wil
- Train operators: Thurbo

Other information
- Fare zone: 924 (Tarifverbund Ostwind)

Passengers
- 2018: 550 per weekday

Services
Preceding station	St. Gallen S-Bahn	Following station
Oppikon towards Wil	S10	Weinfelden towards Romanshorn
Location
- Location within Switzerland Location within Canton of Thurgau

Bussnang railway station (German: Bahnhof Bussnang) is a railway station in the municipality of Bussnang, in the Swiss canton of Thurgau. It is an intermediate stop on the standard gauge Wil–Kreuzlingen line of Thurbo, and is served as a request stop by local trains only.

== Services ==
The following services stop at Bussnang:

- St. Gallen S-Bahn S10: half-hourly service between Wil and Romanshorn, via Weinfelden.

== See also ==
- Rail transport in Switzerland
