= Oppikon railway station =

Train station in Switzerland

Oppikon
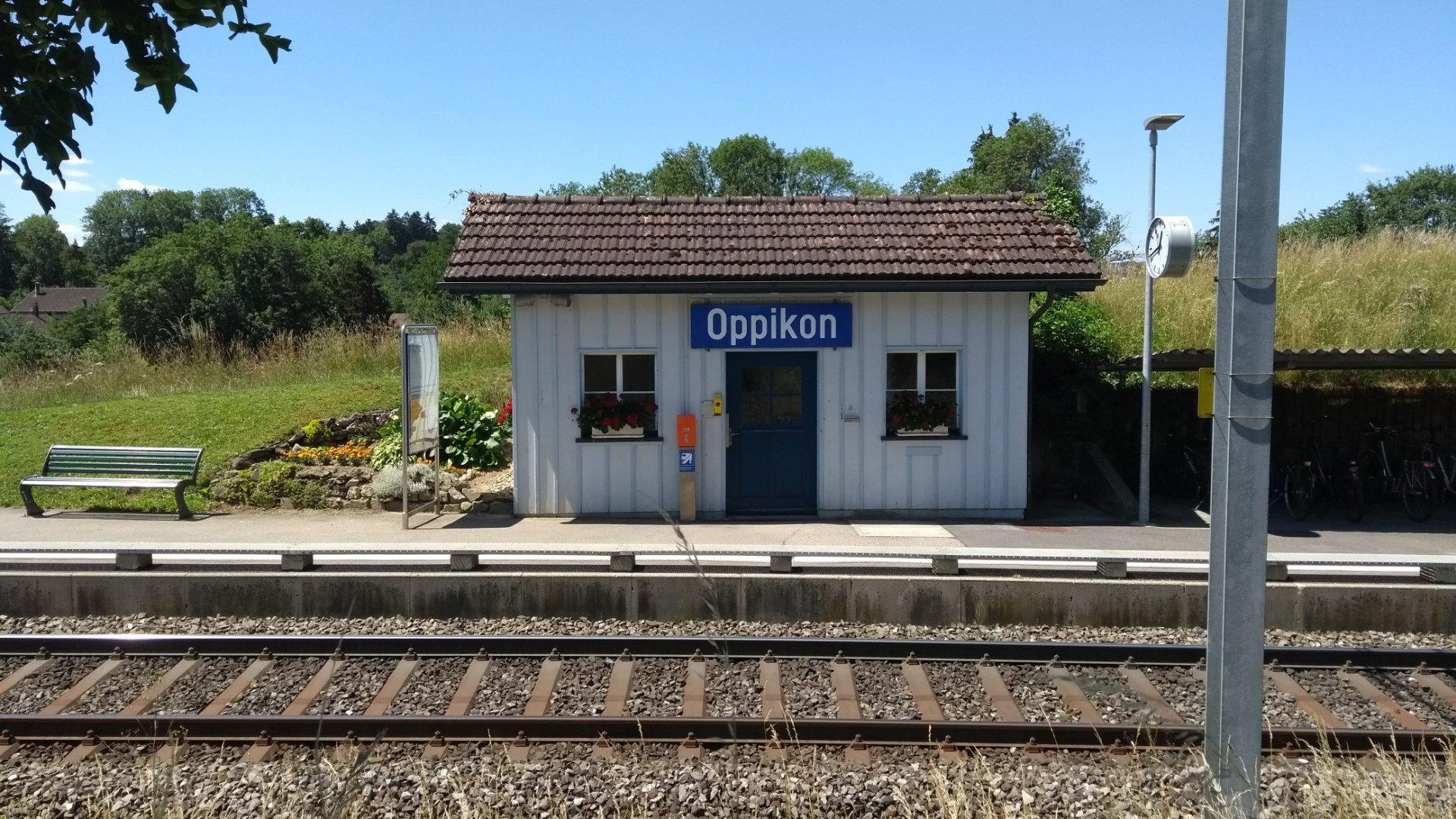
- The station platform in 2018

General information
- Location: Bussnang; Switzerland
- Coordinates: 47°33′07″N 9°03′43″E
- Elevation: 491 m (1,611 ft)
- Owner: Thurbo
- Line: Wil–Kreuzlingen line
- Distance: 14.0 km (8.7 mi) from Wil
- Train operators: Thurbo

Other information
- Fare zone: 924 (Tarifverbund Ostwind)

Services
Preceding station	St. Gallen S-Bahn	Following station
Märwil towards Wil	S10	Bussnang towards Romanshorn
Location
- Location within Switzerland Location within Canton of Thurgau

Oppikon railway station (German: Bahnhof Oppikon) is a railway station in the municipality of Bussnang, in the Swiss canton of Thurgau. It is an intermediate stop on the standard gauge Wil–Kreuzlingen line of Thurbo, and is served as a request stop by local trains only.

== Services ==
The following services stop at Oppikon:

- St. Gallen S-Bahn S10: half-hourly service between Wil and Romanshorn, via Weinfelden.

== See also ==
- Rail transport in Switzerland
