= Bronschhofen =

- Former municipality
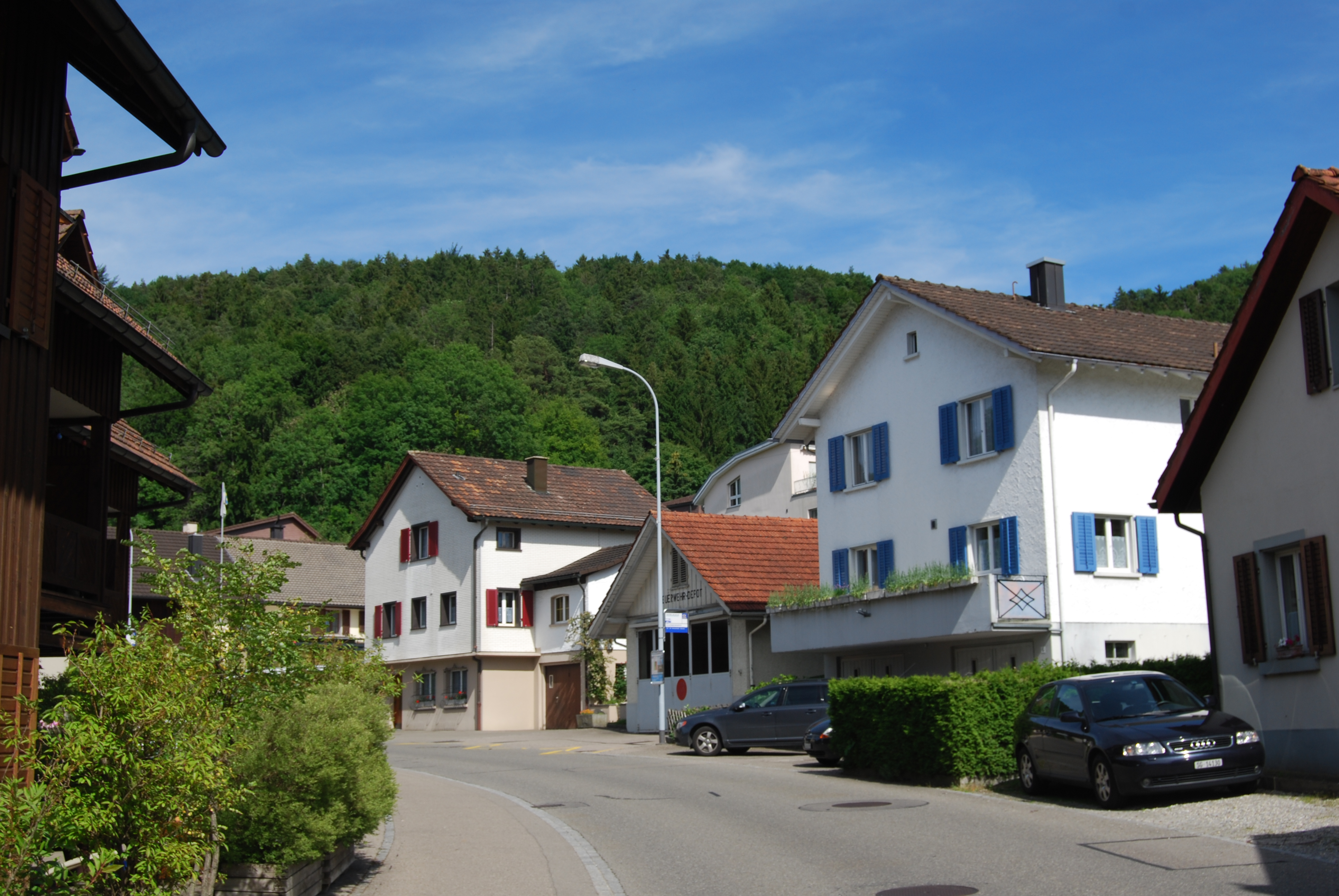

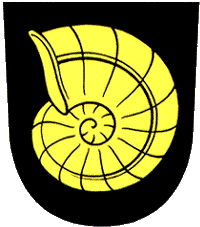
- Coat of arms
- Location of Bronschhofen
- Location within Switzerland Location within Canton of St. Gallen
- Coordinates: 47°29′N 9°2′E
- Country: Switzerland
- Canton: St. Gallen
- District: Wil

Government
  - Mayor: Max Rohr

Area
  - Total: 13.16 km^{2} (5.08 sq mi)
- Elevation: 562 m (1,844 ft)

Population (Dec 2011)
  - Total: 4,654
  - Density: 353.6/km^{2} (915.9/sq mi)
- Time zone: UTC+01:00 (CET)
  - Summer (DST): UTC+02:00 (CEST)
- Postal code: 9552
- SFOS number: 3421
- ISO 3166 code: CH-SG
- Surrounded by: Bettwiesen (TG), Braunau (TG), Münchwilen (TG), Tobel-Tägerschen (TG), Wil, Wuppenau (TG), Zuzwil
- Website: www.bronschhofen.ch

Bronschhofen is a former municipality in the Wahlkreis (constituency) of Wil in the canton of St. Gallen in Switzerland. It merged into Wil on 1 January 2013.

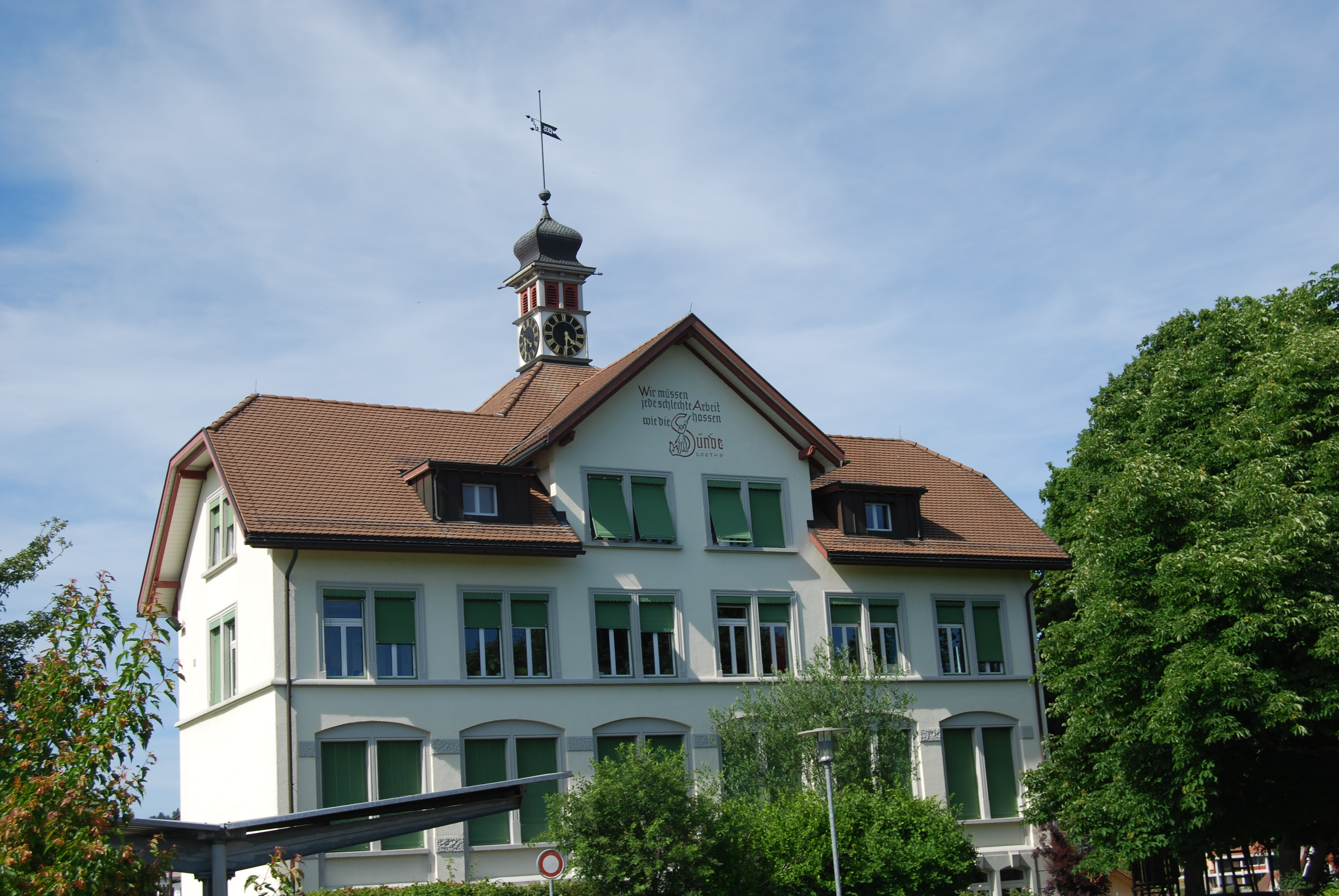
Bronschhofen

== History ==
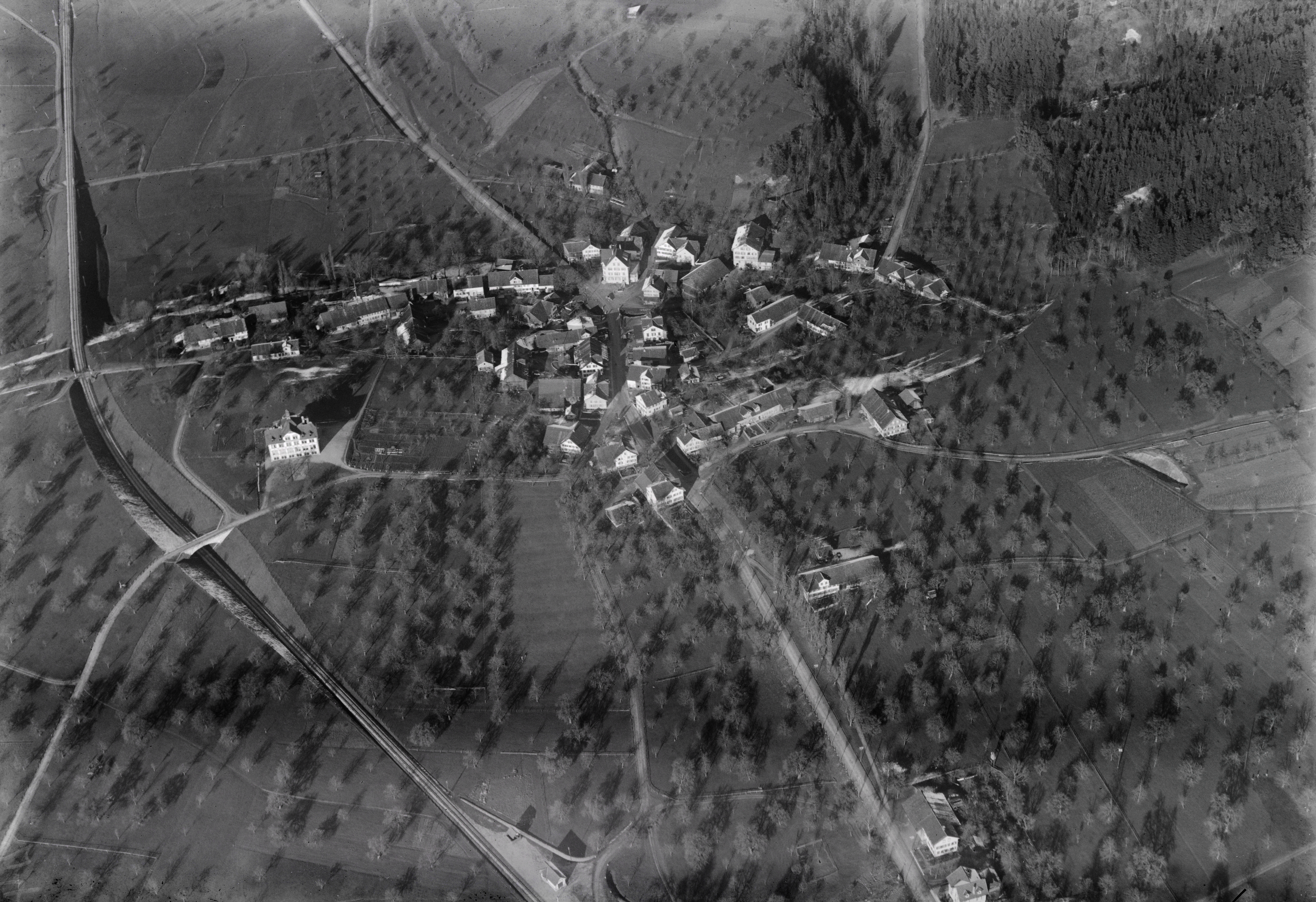
Aerial view from 500 m by Walter Mittelholzer (1923)

Bronschhofen is first mentioned in 796 as Pramolveshova.

== Geography ==
Bronschhofen had an area, as of 2006, of 13.2 km^{2} (5.1 sq mi). Of this area, 65.3% is used for agricultural purposes, while 22.1% is forested. Of the rest of the land, 12% is settled (buildings or roads) and the remainder (0.5%) is non-productive (rivers or lakes).

The former municipality is located in the Wil Wahlkreis. It consists of the villages of Bronschhofen and Rossrüti as well as the hamlets of Maugwil, Trungen and the pilgrimage site of Dreibrunnen.

== Coat of arms ==
The blazon of the municipal coat of arms is Sable a Snail Shell Or.

== Demographics ==
Bronschhofen had a population (as of 2011) of 4,654. As of 2007, about 20.6% of the population was made up of foreign nationals. Of the foreign population, (as of 2000), 74 are from Germany, 249 are from Italy, 364 are from ex-Yugoslavia, 23 are from Austria, 26 are from Turkey, and 90 are from another country. Over the last 10 years the population has grown at a rate of 9.6%. Most of the population (as of 2000) speaks German (88.8%), with Italian being second most common ( 3.4%) and Albanian being third ( 3.1%). Of the Swiss national languages (as of 2000), 3,815 speak German, 11 people speak French, 148 people speak Italian, and 5 people speak Romansh.

The age distribution, as of 2000, in Bronschhofen is; 572 children or 13.3% of the population are between 0 and 9 years old and 561 teenagers or 13.1% are between 10 and 19. Of the adult population, 641 people or 14.9% of the population are between 20 and 29 years old. 757 people or 17.6% are between 30 and 39, 623 people or 14.5% are between 40 and 49, and 575 people or 13.4% are between 50 and 59. The senior population distribution is 317 people or 7.4% of the population are between 60 and 69 years old, 181 people or 4.2% are between 70 and 79, there are 63 people or 1.5% who are between 80 and 89, and there are 6 people or 0.1% who are between 90 and 99, and 1 person who is 100 or more.

In 2000 there were 449 persons (or 10.4% of the population) who were living alone in a private dwelling. There were 998 (or 23.2%) persons who were part of a couple (married or otherwise committed) without children, and 2,510 (or 58.4%) who were part of a couple with children. There were 243 (or 5.7%) people who lived in single parent home, while there are 18 persons who were adult children living with one or both parents, 8 persons who lived in a household made up of relatives, 24 who lived household made up of unrelated persons, and 47 who are either institutionalized or live in another type of collective housing.

In the 2007 federal election the most popular party was the SVP which received 40.4% of the vote. The next three most popular parties were the CVP (21.1%), the FDP (11.8%) and the SP (10%).

The entire Swiss population is generally well educated. In Bronschhofen about 73.4% of the population (between age 25-64) have completed either non-mandatory upper secondary education or additional higher education (either university or a Fachhochschule). Out of the total population in Bronschhofen, as of 2000, the highest education level completed by 816 people (19.0% of the population) was Primary, while 1,758 (40.9%) have completed Secondary, 452 (10.5%) have attended a Tertiary school, and 168 (3.9%) are not in school. The remainder did not answer this question.

The historical population is given in the following table:

year	population
1837	1,025
1850	1,073
1900	1,164
1950	1,430
1970	2,308
2000	4,297

== Heritage sites of national significance ==
The pilgrimage church Maria-Hilf at Dreibrunnen is listed as Swiss heritage site of national significance.

== Economy ==
As of 2007, Bronschhofen had an unemployment rate of 2.26%. As of 2005, there were 171 people employed in the primary economic sector and about 57 businesses involved in this sector. 669 people are employed in the secondary sector and there are 58 businesses in this sector. 731 people are employed in the tertiary sector, with 115 businesses in this sector.

As of October 2009 the average unemployment rate was 4.5%. There were 221 businesses in the municipality of which 56 were involved in the secondary sector of the economy while 113 were involved in the third.

As of 2000 there were 647 residents who worked in the municipality, while 1,800 residents worked outside Bronschhofen and 1,138 people commuted into the municipality for work.

== Religion ==
From the 2000 census, 2,390 or 55.6% are Roman Catholic, while 1,079 or 25.1% belonged to the Swiss Reformed Church. Of the rest of the population, there are 2 individuals (or about 0.05% of the population) who belong to the Christian Catholic faith, there are 68 individuals (or about 1.58% of the population) who belong to the Orthodox Church, and there are 119 individuals (or about 2.77% of the population) who belong to another Christian church. There is 1 individual who is Jewish, and 244 (or about 5.68% of the population) who are Islamic. There are 11 individuals (or about 0.26% of the population) who belong to another church (not listed on the census), 258 (or about 6.00% of the population) belong to no church, are agnostic or atheist, and 125 individuals (or about 2.91% of the population) did not answer the question.

== Transport ==
Bronschhofen sits on the Wil–Kreuzlingen line between Wil and Weinfelden and is served by the St. Gallen S-Bahn at Bronschhofen and Bronschhofen AMP.

== Notable people ==
- Josef Flammer (born 1948) an ophthalmologist and a glaucoma specialist; long-time director of the Eye Clinic at Basel University Hospital
