= Bettwiesen railway station =

Train station in Switzerland

Bettwiesen
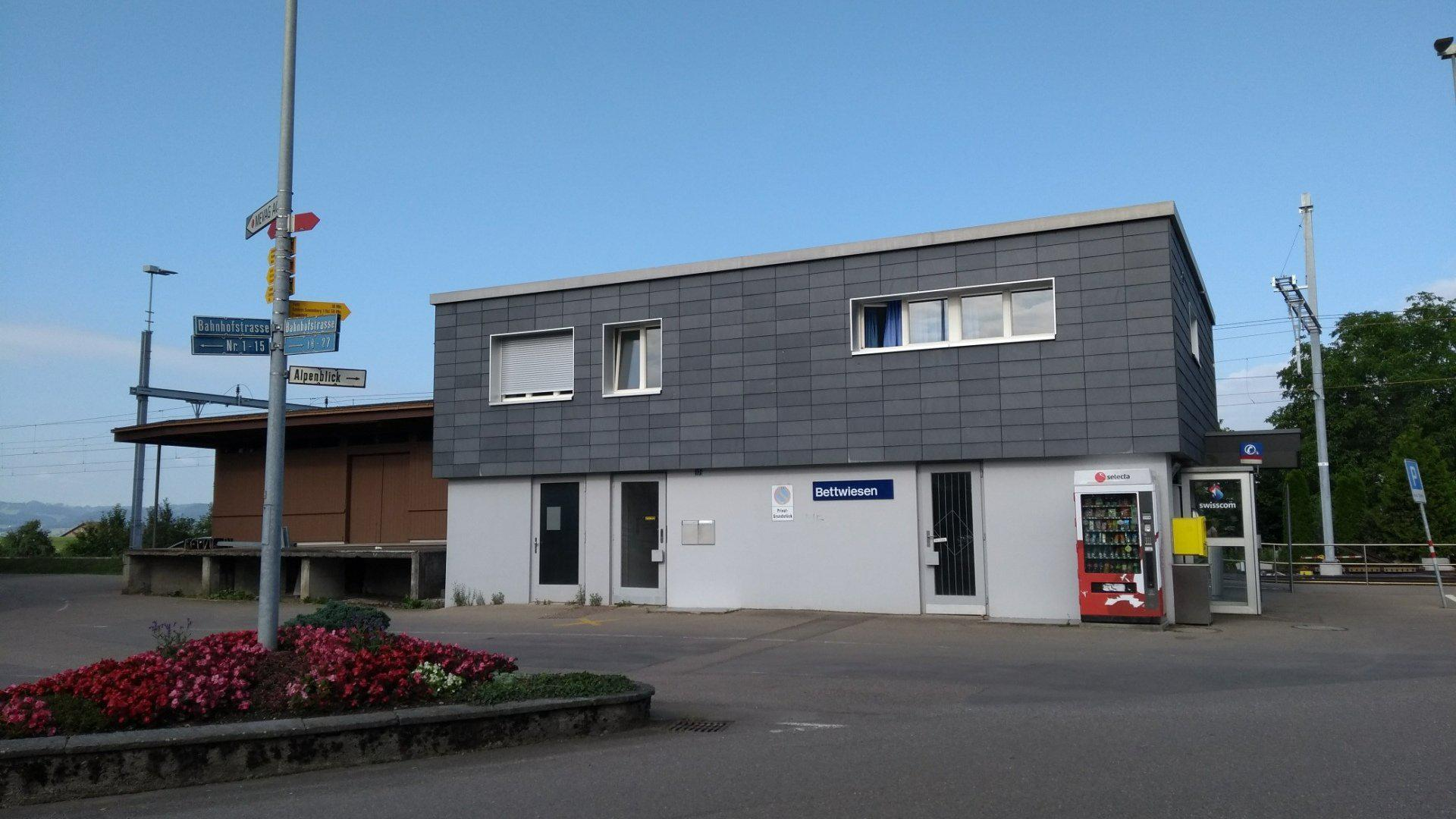
- The station building in 2018

General information
- Location: Bettwiesen; Switzerland
- Coordinates: 47°29′56″N 9°01′16″E
- Elevation: 546 m (1,791 ft)
- Owner: Thurbo
- Line: Wil–Kreuzlingen
- Distance: 5.5 km (3.4 mi) from Wil
- Train operators: Thurbo

Other information
- Fare zone: 915 (Tarifverbund Ostwind)

Passengers
- 2018: 240 per weekday

Services
Preceding station	St. Gallen S-Bahn	Following station
Bronschhofen AMP towards Wil	S10	Tägerschen towards Romanshorn
Location
- Location within Switzerland Location within Canton of Thurgau

Bettwiesen railway station (German: Bahnhof Bettwiesen) is a railway station in the municipality of Bettwiesen, in the Swiss canton of Thurgau. It is an intermediate stop on the standard gauge Wil–Kreuzlingen line of Thurbo, and is served as a request stop by local trains only.

== Services ==
The following services stop at Bettwiesen:

- St. Gallen S-Bahn S10: half-hourly service between Wil and Romanshorn, via Weinfelden.

== See also ==
- Rail transport in Switzerland
