= Bronschhofen AMP railway station =

Train station in Switzerland

Bronschhofen AMP
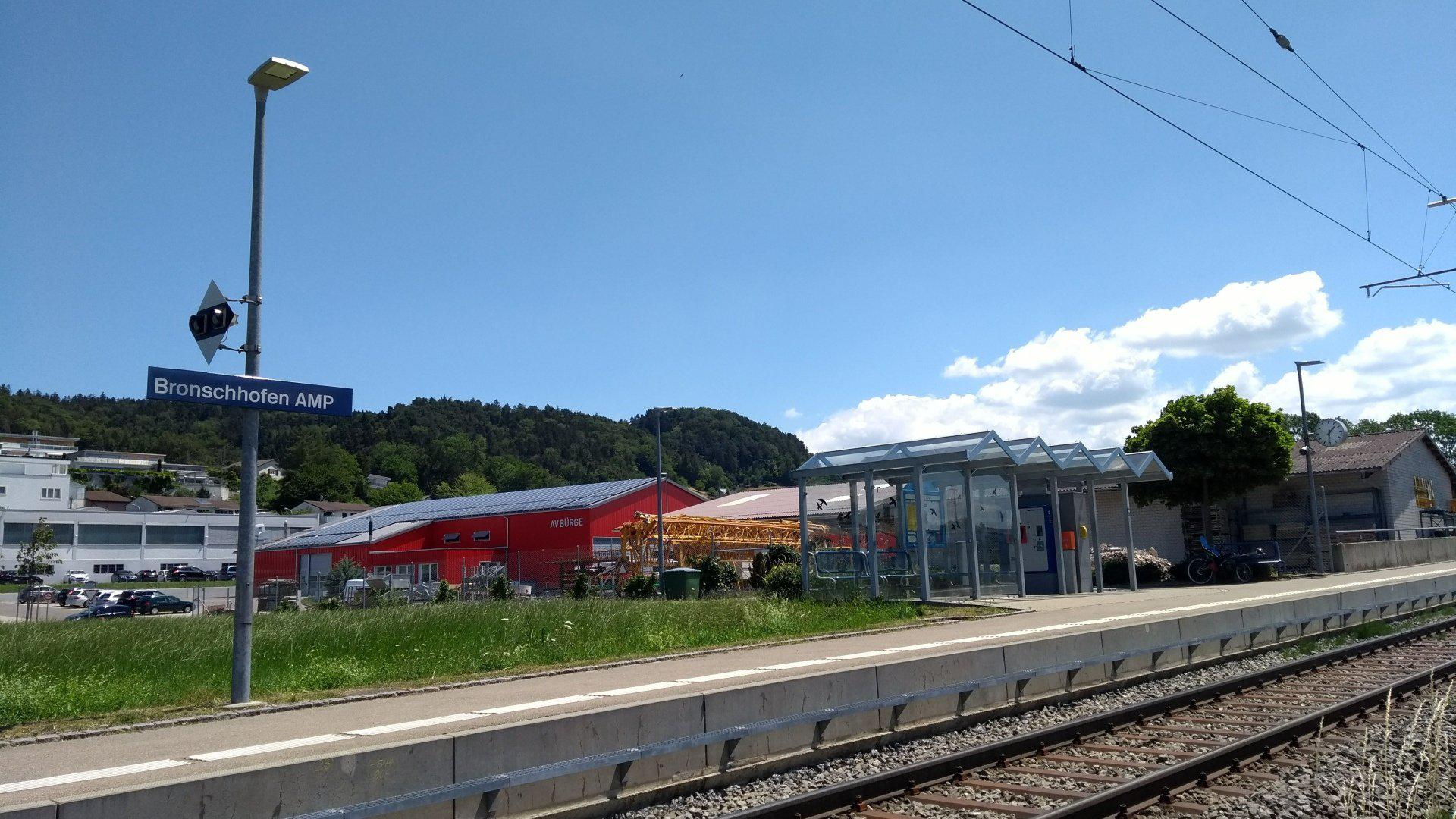
- The station platform in 2018

General information
- Location: Wil; Switzerland
- Coordinates: 47°28′52″N 9°01′52″E
- Elevation: 558 m (1,831 ft)
- Owner: Thurbo
- Line: Wil–Kreuzlingen
- Distance: 3.3 km (2.1 mi) from Wil
- Train operators: Thurbo

Other information
- Fare zone: 916 (Tarifverbund Ostwind)

Passengers
- 2018: 170 per weekday

Services
Preceding station	St. Gallen S-Bahn	Following station
Bronschhofen towards Wil	S10	Bettwiesen towards Romanshorn
Location
- Location within Switzerland Location within Canton of St. Gallen

Bronschhofen AMP railway station (German: Bahnhof Bronschhofen AMP) is a railway station in the village of Bronschhofen, part of the municipality of Wil, in the Swiss canton of St. Gallen. It is an intermediate stop on the Wil–Kreuzlingen line of Thurbo, and is served as a request stop by local trains only.

== Services ==
The following services stop at Bronschhofen AMP:

- St. Gallen S-Bahn S10: half-hourly service between Wil and Romanshorn, via Weinfelden.

== See also ==
- Rail transport in Switzerland
