= Zezikon =

Village in Frauenfeld, Switzerland

Coordinates: 47.535°N 9.0213°E

Zezikon is a village and former municipality in the district of Frauenfeld in the canton of Thurgau, Switzerland. It was first recorded in 827 as Zezinchova.

The municipality also contained the villages Battlehausen, Kaltenbrunnen, Maltbach and Wildern. It had 375 inhabitants in 1860, which decreased to 293 in 1900, 233 in 1950 and 220 in 1970. It then increased again, to 299 in 1990.

In 1995 the municipality was incorporated into the larger, neighboring municipality Affeltrangen.
