= Tobel-Tägerschen =

- Municipality
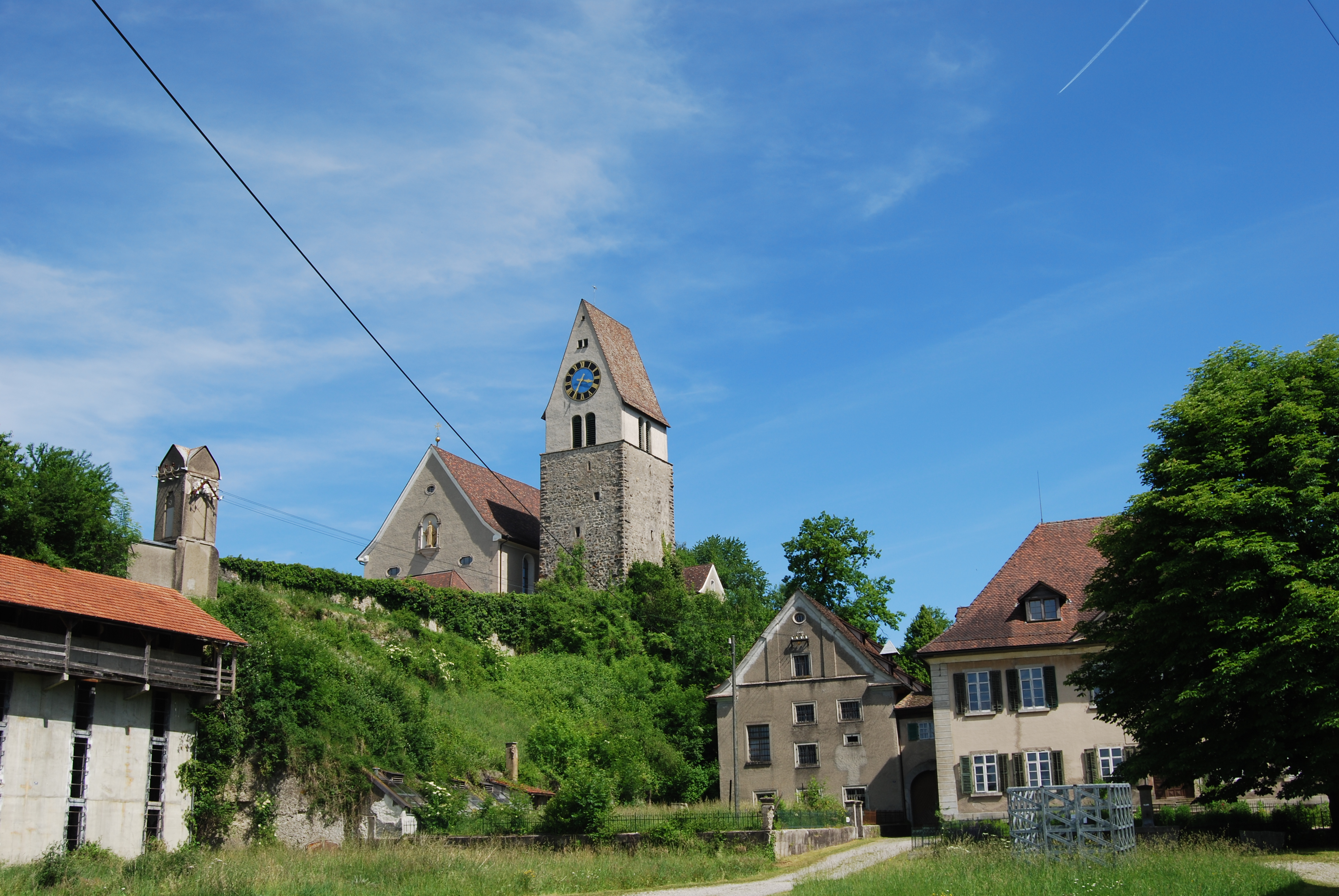

- Flag Coat of arms
- Location of Tobel-Tägerschen
- Location within Switzerland Location within Canton of Thurgau
- Coordinates: 47°31′N 9°2′E
- Country: Switzerland
- Canton: Thurgau
- District: Münchwilen

Area
  - Total: 7.11 km^{2} (2.75 sq mi)
- Elevation: 525 m (1,722 ft)

Population (December 2007)
  - Total: 1,351
  - Density: 190/km^{2} (492/sq mi)
- Time zone: UTC+01:00 (CET)
  - Summer (DST): UTC+02:00 (CEST)
- Postal code: 9555
- SFOS number: 4776
- ISO 3166 code: CH-TG
- Localities: Tägerschen, Tobel, Karlishub, Thürn
- Surrounded by: Affeltrangen, Bettwiesen, Braunau, Bronschhofen (SG), Lommis
- Website: tobel-taegerschen.ch

Tobel-Tägerschen is a municipality in the district of Münchwilen in the canton of Thurgau in Switzerland.

The municipality was created in 1999 by a merger of Tägerschen and Tobel.

== History ==
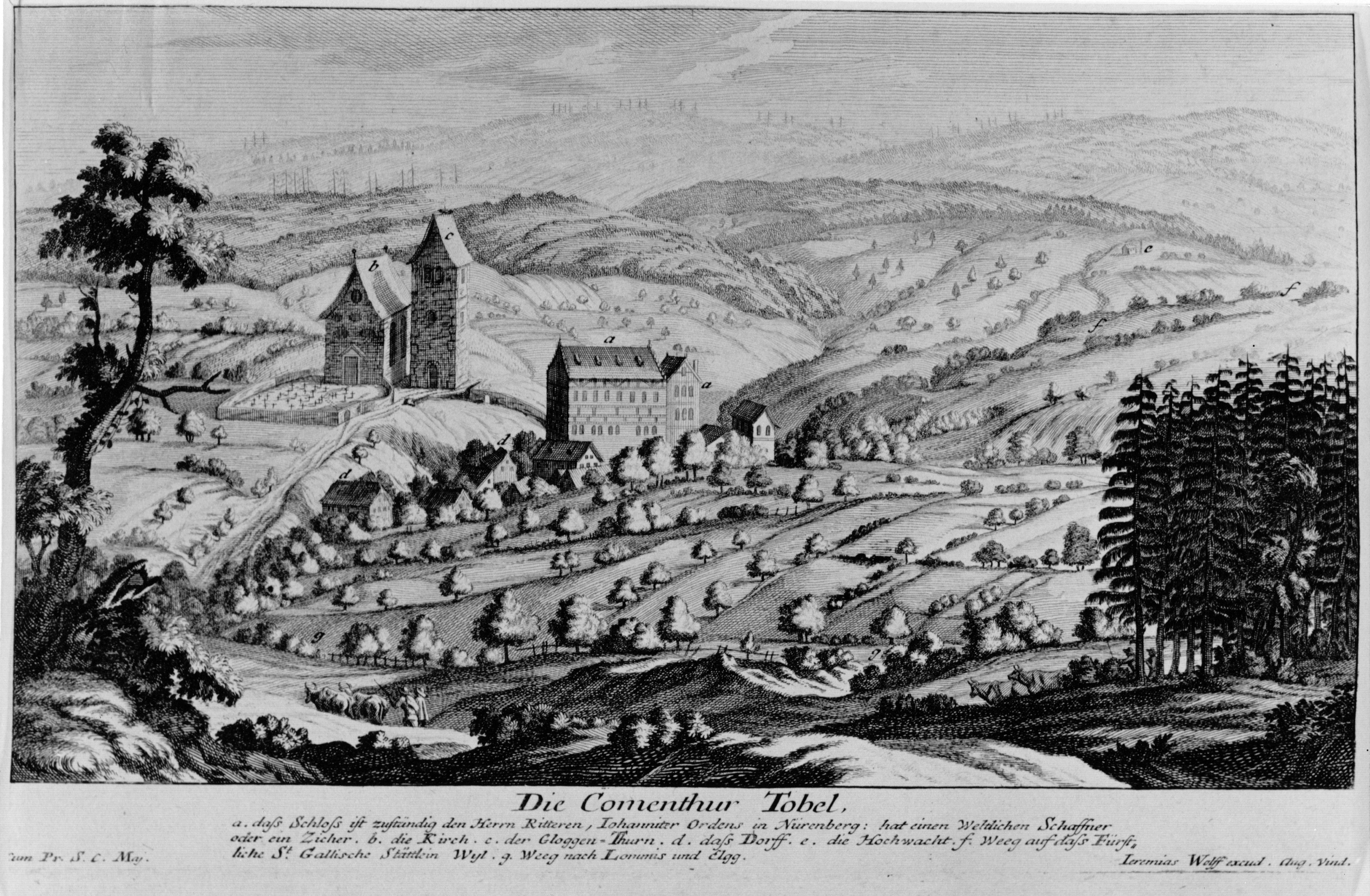
Commandry of Tobel from 1706 to 1724

Aerial view (1953)

Tägerschen is first mentioned in 762 as Tegarascha.

In the 8th and 9th century, much of the village of Tägerschen was acquired by the Abbey of St. Gallen. The court rights were originally held by the Counts of Toggenburg through their servants, the Heitnau family. These rights transferred in 1258 to the Knights Hospitaller Commandry of Tobel. These rights gradually expanded until 1500, by which time they had complete Manor and court rights. The only exceptions was a house that had been granted freedom from local lords in 1547. The ownership of this house changed often in the following centuries. Between 1798 and 1871, this house served as the headquarters of the district governor of Tobel. Later, it housed an embroidery, and then a dairy that is still in existence.

Catholics and Protestants were divided into the parishes of Tobel and Affeltrangen.

The first village laws were documented in 1490 and regulated the daily life. Grain was cultivated in the three-field system with some viticulture. In the 19th century the economy transitioned to produce hay, with some fruit production starting in 1911. Between 1870 and 1914 the village shared in the embroidery boom and in 1910 there were 26 embroidery workers in the village. In 1924, a needle factory opened followed in 1978 by a tank farm for petroleum products with rail access to the Thurgau-Bahn rail-line.

== Geography ==
Tobel-Tägerschen has an area, as of 2009, of 7.11 square kilometers (2.75 sq mi). Of this area, 4.2 km^{2} (1.6 sq mi) or 59.1% is used for agricultural purposes, while 2.06 km^{2} (0.80 sq mi) or 29.0% is forested. Of the rest of the land, 0.81 km^{2} (0.31 sq mi) or 11.4% is settled (buildings or roads), 0.02 km^{2} (4.9 acres) or 0.3% is either rivers or lakes.

Of the built up area, industrial buildings made up 5.3% of the total area while housing and buildings made up 0.4% and transportation infrastructure made up 1.8%. while parks, green belts and sports fields made up 3.5%. Out of the forested land, all of the forested land area is covered with heavy forests. Of the agricultural land, 54.6% is used for growing crops, while 4.5% is used for orchards or vine crops. All the water in the municipality is flowing water.

The municipality is located in the Münchwilen district. It consists of the villages of Tobel and Tägerschen, which merged in 1999.

== Demographics ==
Tobel-Tägerschen has a population (as of December 2020) of 1,589 As of 2008, 12.2% of the population are foreign nationals. Most of the population (as of 2000) speaks German(92.2%), with Serbo-Croatian being second most common ( 2.3%) and Albanian being third ( 1.7%).

As of 2008, the gender distribution of the population was 49.5% male and 50.5% female. The population was made up of 595 Swiss men (43.2% of the population), and 87 (6.3%) non-Swiss men. There were 615 Swiss women (44.6%), and 81 (5.9%) non-Swiss women.

In 2008, there were 13 live births to Swiss citizens and 3 births to non-Swiss citizens, and in same time span there were 13 deaths of Swiss citizens. Ignoring immigration and emigration, the population of Swiss citizens remained the same while the foreign population increased by 3. There were 2 Swiss men who emigrated from Switzerland to another country, 1 Swiss woman who emigrated from Switzerland to another country, 4 non-Swiss men who emigrated from Switzerland to another country and 6 non-Swiss women who emigrated from Switzerland to another country. The total Swiss population change in 2008 (from all sources) was an increase of 11 and the non-Swiss population change was an increase of 6 people. This represents a population growth rate of 1.2%.

The age distribution, as of 2009, in Tobel-Tägerschen is; 167 children or 12.1% of the population are between 0 and 9 years old and 185 teenagers or 13.4% are between 10 and 19. Of the adult population, 186 people or 13.5% of the population are between 20 and 29 years old. 183 people or 13.3% are between 30 and 39, 249 people or 18.0% are between 40 and 49, and 173 people or 12.5% are between 50 and 59. The senior population distribution is 128 people or 9.3% of the population are between 60 and 69 years old, 76 people or 5.5% are between 70 and 79, there are 29 people or 2.1% who are between 80 and 89, and there are 4 people or 0.3% who are 90 and older.

As of 2000, there were 476 private households in the municipality, and an average of 2.6 persons per household. In 2000 there were 204 single family homes (or 82.3% of the total) out of a total of 248 inhabited buildings. There were 13 two family buildings (5.2%), 10 three family buildings (4.0%) and 21 multi-family buildings (or 8.5%). There were 269 (or 21.0%) persons who were part of a couple without children, and 733 (or 57.3%) who were part of a couple with children. There were 63 (or 4.9%) people who lived in single parent home, while there are 16 persons who were adult children living with one or both parents, 10 persons who lived in a household made up of relatives, 13 who lived in a household made up of unrelated persons, and 47 who are either institutionalized or live in another type of collective housing.

The vacancy rate for the municipality, in 2008, was 1.45%. As of 2007, the construction rate of new housing units was 2.9 new units per 1000 residents. In 2000, there were 515 apartments in the municipality. The most common apartment size was the 4 room apartment of which there were 156. There were 13 single room apartments and 113 apartments with six or more rooms. As of 2000, the average price to rent an average apartment in Tobel-Tägerschen was 1064.74 Swiss francs (CHF) per month (US$850, £480, €680 approx. exchange rate from 2000). The average rate for a one-room apartment was 406.67 CHF (US$330, £180, €260), a two-room apartment was about 677.20 CHF (US$540, £300, €430), a three-room apartment was about 933.89 CHF (US$750, £420, €600) and a six or more room apartment cost an average of 1331.33 CHF (US$1070, £600, €850). The average apartment price in Tobel-Tägerschen was 95.4% of the national average of 1116 CHF.

In the 2007 federal election, the most popular party was the SVP which received 56.94% of the vote. The next three most popular parties were the CVP (16.19%), the Green Party (6.2%) and the FDP (5.85%). In the federal election, a total of 452 votes were cast, and the voter turnout was 49.0%.

The historical population is given in the following table:

Year	Population Tägerschen	Population Tobel-Tägerschen
1850	226	
1880	188	
1910	253	
1950		830
1970	263	857
1990	389	1,128
2000		1,280

== Sights ==
The entire Tobel area is designated as part of the Inventory of Swiss Heritage Sites.

== Economy ==
As of 2007, Tobel-Tägerschen had an unemployment rate of 1.56%. As of 2005, there were 64 people employed in the primary economic sector and about 23 businesses involved in this sector. 285 people are employed in the secondary sector and there are 22 businesses in this sector. 280 people are employed in the tertiary sector, with 44 businesses in this sector.

In 2000, there were 892 workers who lived in the municipality. Of these, 432 or about 48.4% of the residents worked outside Tobel-Tägerschen while 392 people commuted into the municipality for work. There were a total of 852 jobs (of at least 6 hours per week) in the municipality. Of the working population, 5.4% used public transportation to get to work, and 53% used a private car.

== Religion ==
From the 2000 census, 620 or 48.4% were Roman Catholic, while 437 or 34.1% belonged to the Swiss Reformed Church. Of the rest of the population, there was 1 Old Catholic who belonged to the Christian Catholic Church of Switzerland there are 40 individuals (or about 3.13% of the population) who belong to the Orthodox Church, and there are 50 individuals (or about 3.91% of the population) who belong to another Christian church. There were 19 (or about 1.48% of the population) who are Islamic. There are 1 individuals (or about 0.08% of the population) who belong to another church (not listed on the census), 78 (or about 6.09% of the population) belong to no church, are agnostic or atheist, and 34 individuals (or about 2.66% of the population) did not answer the question.

== Transport ==
Tobel-Tägerschen sits on the Wil–Kreuzlingen line between Wil and Weinfelden and is served by the St. Gallen S-Bahn at Tägerschen and Tobel-Affeltrangen.

== Education ==
In Tobel-Tägerschen about 71.5% of the population (between age 25 and 64) have completed either non-mandatory upper secondary education or additional higher education (either university or a Fachhochschule).

Tobel-Tägerschen is home to the Tobel-Tägerschencombined municipal and primary school district. In the 2008/2009 school year there were 143 students. There were 33 children in the kindergarten, and the average class size was 33 kindergartners. Of the children in kindergarten, 19 or 57.6% were female, 4 or 12.1% were not Swiss citizens and 5 or 15.2% did not speak German natively. The lower and upper primary levels begin at about age 5-6 and last for 6 years. There were 52 children in who were at the lower primary level and 58 children in the upper primary level. The average class size in the primary school was 22 students. At the lower primary level, there were 32 children or 61.5% of the total population who were female, 4 or 7.7% were not Swiss citizens and 4 or 7.7% did not speak German natively. In the upper primary level, there were 29 or 50.0% who were female, 6 or 10.3% were not Swiss citizens and 7 or 12.1% did not speak German natively.
