= Märwil =

- Village
- Location within Switzerland
- Coordinates: 47°31′N 9°05′E
- Country: Switzerland
- Canton: Canton of Thurgau
- District: Frauenfeld (district)

Märwil is a village and former municipality in the district of Frauenfeld in the canton of Thurgau, Switzerland.

It was first recorded in 827 as Marinwilare.

The municipality also contained the villages Breite, Ghürst, Himmenreich and Langnau. It had 357 inhabitants in 1850, which decreased to 274 in 1900. It then increased to 461 in 1950, 579 in 1970 and 622 in 1990.

In 1995 the municipality was incorporated into the larger, neighboring municipality Affeltrangen.

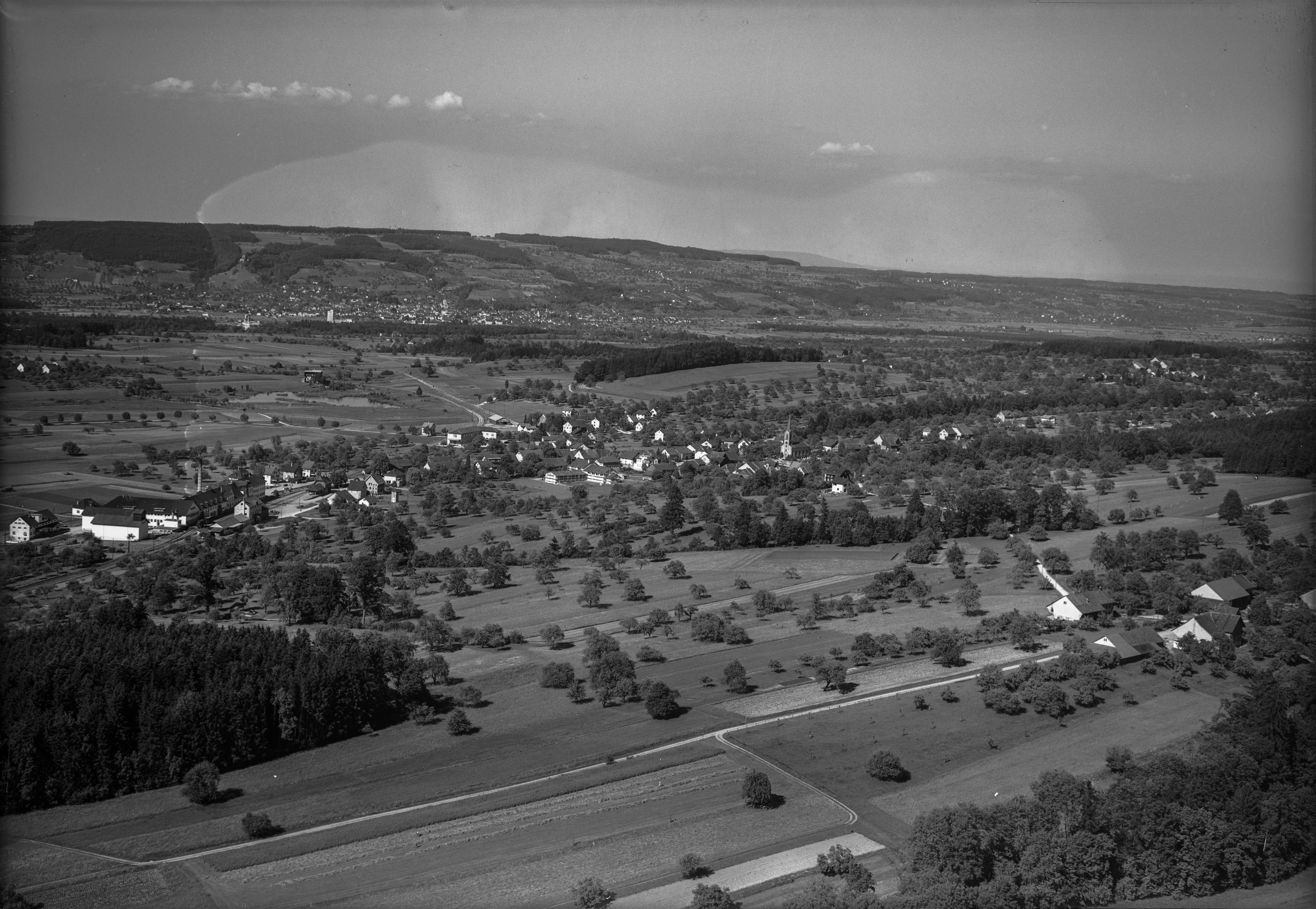
Aerial view (1950)
