= Tobel, Thurgau =

Coordinates: 47°31′N 9°02′E

Tobel is a village and former municipality in the canton of Thurgau, Switzerland.

In 1999 the municipality was merged with the neighboring municipality Tägerschen to form a new and larger municipality Tobel-Tägerschen.
