= Tägerschen =

Coordinates: 47.509°N 9.030°E

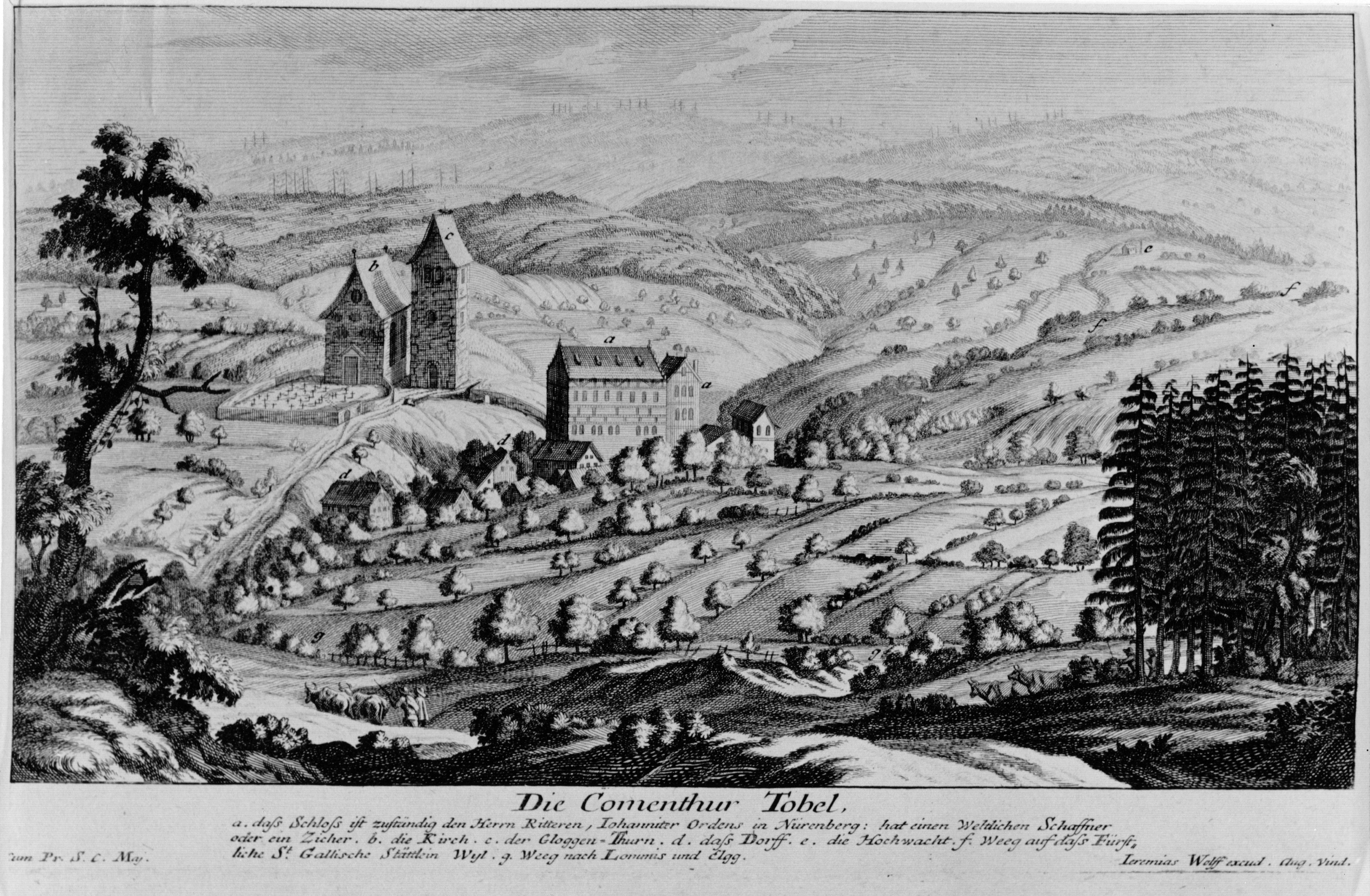
Commandery of Tobel in the 18th century. The commandery owned most of the village.

Tägerschen is a village and former municipality in the canton of Thurgau, Switzerland.

The municipality also contained the villages Karlishub and Thürn.

In 1999 the municipality was merged with the neighboring municipality Tobel to form a new and larger municipality Tobel-Tägerschen.

== History ==
The village was first recorded in year 762 as Tegarascha.

In the 8th and 9th century much of the village was acquired by the Abbey of St. Gallen. The court rights were originally held by the Counts of Toggenburg through their servants, the Heitnau family. These rights transferred in 1258 to the Knights Hospitaller Commandry of Tobel. These rights gradually expanded until 1500, by which time they had complete manor and court rights. The only exceptions was a house that had been granted freedom from local lords in 1547. The ownership of this house changed often in the following centuries. Between 1798 and 1871 this house served as the headquarters of the district governor of Tobel. Later, it housed an embroidery, and then a dairy that is still in existence.

Catholics and Protestants were divided into the parishes of Tobel and Affeltrangen.

The first village laws were documented in 1490 and regulated the daily life. Grain was cultivated in the three-field system with some viticulture. In the 19th century the economy transitioned to produce hay, with some fruit production starting in 1911. Between 1870 and 1914 the village shared in the embroidery boom and in 1910 there were 26 embroidery workers in the village. In 1924, a needle factory opened followed in 1978 by a tank farm for petroleum products with rail access to the Thurgau-Bahn rail-line.

== Historic population ==
The historical population is given in the following table:

Year	Population
1850	226
1880	188
1910	253
1970	263
1990	389
