= Bohl =

Bohl is a surname. Notable people with the surname include:

- Aaron Bohl (born 1994), American football player and coach
- Craig Bohl (born 1958), American football coach
- Daniel Bohl (born 1994), German footballer
- Friedrich Bohl (born 1945), German politician
- Georgia Bohl (born 1997), Australian swimmer
- Jochen Bohl (1950-2026), German Lutheran bishop
- Otto Bohl (1885–1969), German politician
- Piers Bohl (1865–1921), Latvian mathematician
- Steffen Bohl (born 1983), German footballer
