= Wil–Kreuzlingen railway =

Railway line in Switzerland

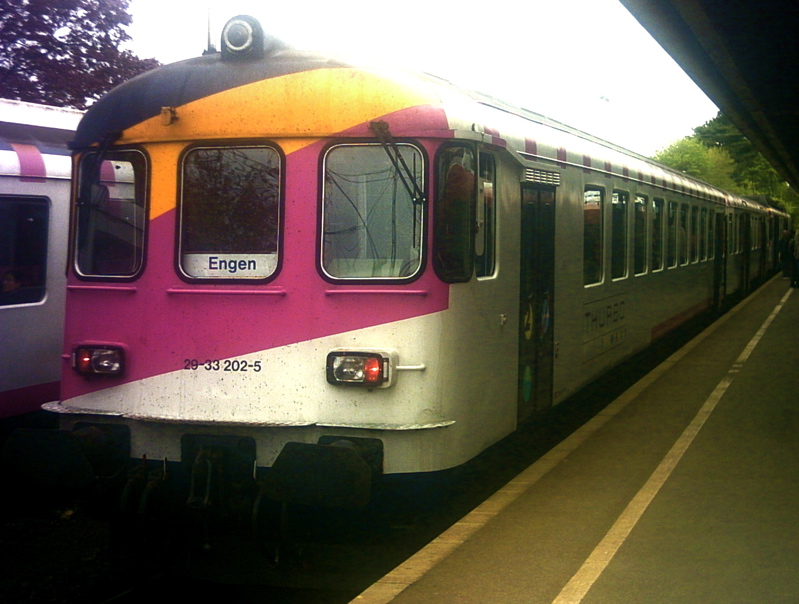
- MThB control car (Bt 202) bound for Engen

Overview
- Native name: Mittelthurgaubahn
- Owner: Swiss Federal Railways/THURBO
- Line number: 830, 835
- Termini: Wil; Kreuzlingen

Technical
- Line length: 39.58 km (24.59 mi)
- Number of tracks: 1 (mostly)
- Track gauge: 1,435 mm (4 ft 8 1/2 in) standard gauge
- Electrification: 15 kV/16.7 Hz AC overhead catenary
- Maximum incline: 2.4%

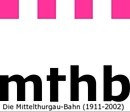
Former logo of the Mittelthurgaubahn

The Wil–Kreuzlingen railway is a largely single-track standard-gauge line in northeastern Switzerland. It was built by the Mittelthurgaubahn; MThB), which was a Swiss private railway based in Weinfelden. It was liquidated in 2003, including its subsidiary Lokoop, and its activities and the infrastructure it owned were mainly taken over by a Swiss Federal Railways (SBB) subsidiary, Thurbo, which was originally formed as a joint venture between the MThB and the SBB.

== History ==
After an initiative committee for the construction of the Mittel-Thurgau-Bahn (Central Thurgau Railway; MThB) was established in Kreuzlingen on 11 August 1890, the committee made its first contacts with the Westdeutsche Eisenbahn-Gesellschaft (West German Railway Company; WeEG) based in Cologne in 1899. An application for a concession for a standard-gauge railway, which had been prepared by engineer Jakob Ehrensperger from Winterthur, was submitted to the Federal Council in 1901. The Swiss Federal Assembly granted the concession for a railway from Wil via Weinfelden to the state border at Konstanz on 19 December 1902. The Grand Duchy of Baden State Ministry approved the entrance of the line into Konstanz station in 1903. The initiative committee concluded a 15-year non-terminable contract for the construction and operation of a standard-gauge Wil-Weinfelden-Konstanz railway with the WeEG in 1906. This contract used the name Mittel-Thurgau-Bahn - MThB for the first time and a joint stock company was founded under this name on 28 April 1908. The issue of stock began on 26 November 1906. The largest share purchase was made by the canton of Thurgau, other notable share purchases were made by the three cities of Konstanz, Weinfelden and Wil as well as the canton of St. Gallen. Another 27 municipalities along with private interests joined the share register. The WeEG raised bonds worth CHF 3 million.

The ground-breaking ceremony was held between Weinfelden and Thur on 10 September 1909. 60,000 cubic metres of earth were moved. Among the seven engineering structures to be built were four large structures. Work on the Bussnang viaduct was started late and the last section to be built was from the Weinfelden mountain down to Weinfelden because detailed approvals were delayed. The inspection of the iron bridges began in 1911. The Thur bridge was loaded with three type B 3/4 tender locomotives of the SBB, each weighing approximately 85 tons. Further investigations of the substructure and superstructure, the intersections of the railway with power lines, the structures and the rolling stock, finally allowed the opening of the Wil–Weinfelden–Kreuzlingen–Konstanz line on 16 December 1911. The WeEG operated the line under contract. The contract for operations was transferred to Vereinigte Kleinbahnen AG (VKA) of Frankfurt am Main in 1931. It sold its interest, in particular the interest-bearing bonds, to the AG für Verkehrswesen in Berlin Wilmersdorf, with a small proportion going to the Overseas Trust Corporation Ltd. of Johannesburg. A package of bearer shares had been issued to Midland Bank Ltd. of London, but the VKA bought them back in 1938. The contract for operations was temporarily suspended during the war years. After the First and Second World Wars, the MThB was an important source of hard currency for German counterparties in the periods of high inflation. The contract was terminated at the end of 1950 and the MThB took over its own operations.

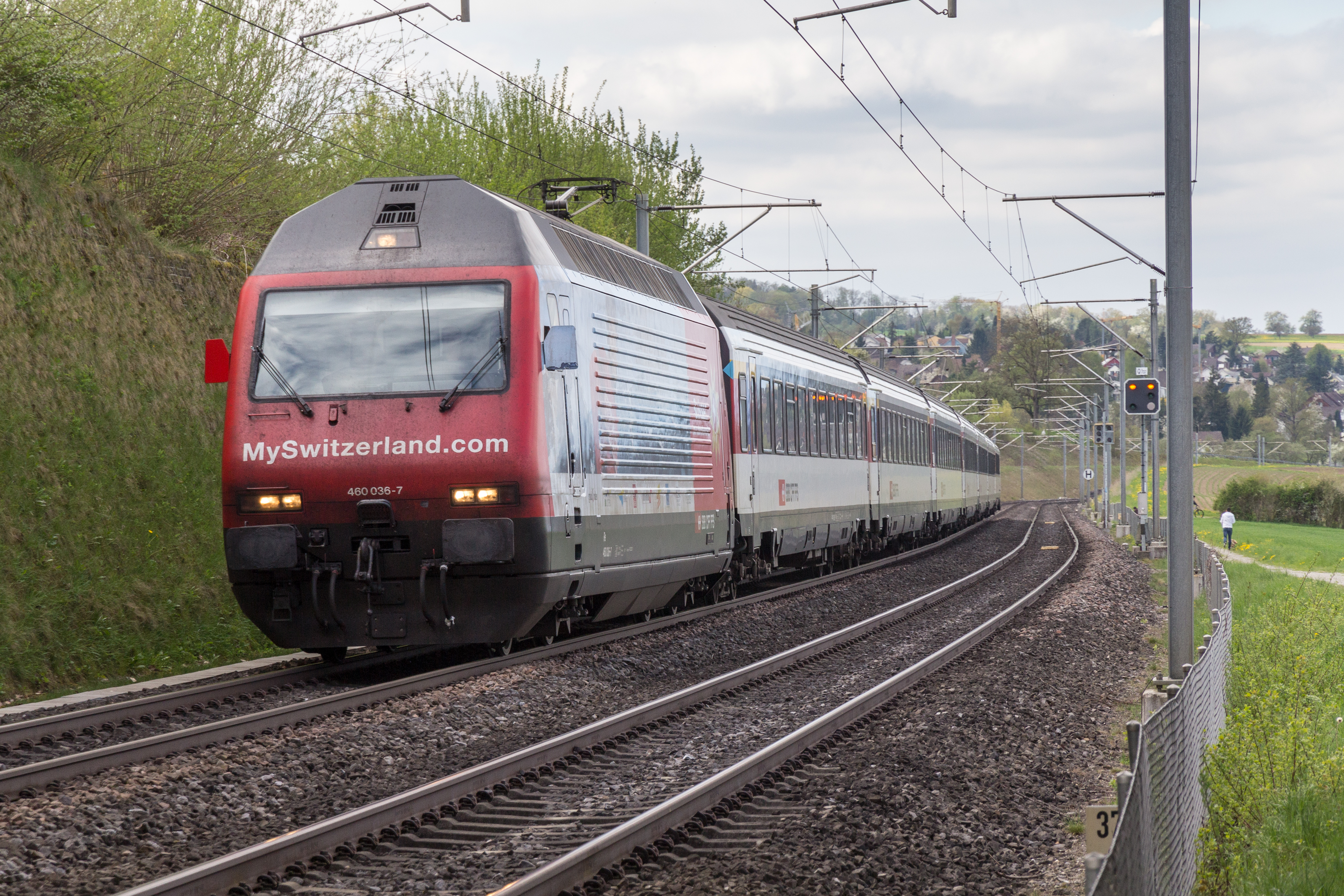
SBB Interregio on the former MThB Konstanz–Weinfelden route on the double-track section between Tägerwilen and Kreuzlingen-Bernrain (2013)

The 41-kilometre, standard-gauge and single-track line from Kreuzlingen via Weinfelden to Wil lies predominantly in the canton of Thurgau, while only the last, four-kilometre section is in the canton of St. Gallen. It was opened on 20 December 1911 for passenger and freight traffic and operated with steam trains. From 1938 it was also operated with a diesel railcar, initially rented. As the last significant private railway in Switzerland, it introduced electrical operations on 24 September 1965. The Reisebüro Mittelthurgau, which operates river cruises, was founded as a subsidiary in 1969.

The trains generally began and ended in Konstanz, where a connection to the German state railway network existed. They used the 1 km-long Kreuzlingen–Konstanz line, which had been opened by the Swiss National Railway (Schweizerische Nationalbahn; SNB) on 17 July 1875 and later transferred to the SBB.

Shortly before its end, the MThB expanded and also took over lines that ran to Germany. However, investments in infrastructure and rolling stock meant that it assumed considerable debt. Mittelthurgaubahn AG was finally dissolved on 11 October 2002. The chief executives were Peter Joss, longtime director, and Hermann Lei (a former member of the Grand Council of Thurgau). The rolling stock and the equipment were taken over by Thurbo AG.

=== Extended operations of the Mittelthurgaubahn ===
In addition to its main line, MThB took over the management of operations in the 1990s on the following routes in Germany and Switzerland:

- Germany:
  - Seehas: Konstanz – Radolfzell – Singen – Engen, on behalf of Deutsche Bahn
  - Seehäsle: Radolfzell – Stockach on the non-electrified Radolfzell–Mengen railway, on behalf of the district of Konstanz
- Switzerland
  - Rorschach - Romanshorn – Kreuzlingen – Stein am Rhein – Schaffhausen
  - SBB Lake Line (Seelinie); the operation of the line was won in competition with the SBB; it included the upgrade of the infrastructure, the procurement of new rolling stock and regular interval operations.

These tasks have been taken over by the SBB subsidiaries, SBB GmbH (Germany) and Thurbo (Switzerland). The latter is now also the owner of the (Kreuzlingen–) Tägermoos – (Weinfelden) – (Wil) line. The infrastructure of the Lake Line was returned to the control of the SBB, which also operates the infrastructure of the Wil–Kreuzlingen railway on behalf of Thurbo.

Part of the historic rolling stock, such as the Mostindien-Express with the steam locomotive Ec 3/5 number 3 (built in 1912) together with the associated cars, a railcar (ABDe 4/4 number 12) and a few others Vehicles are maintained and operated by the Verein Historische Mittel-Thurgau-Bahn for nostalgia, social and excursion trips. These are to be exhibited in the Locorama rail adventure theme park in Romanshorn.

== Current operations ==
Services are operated every 30 minutes between Wil and Weinfelden as line S10 and between Weinfelden, Kreuzlingen and Konstanz as line S14 of the St. Gallen S-Bahn.
