= Rickenbach-Attikon railway station =

Railway station in Thurgau, Switzerland

Rickenbach-Attikon
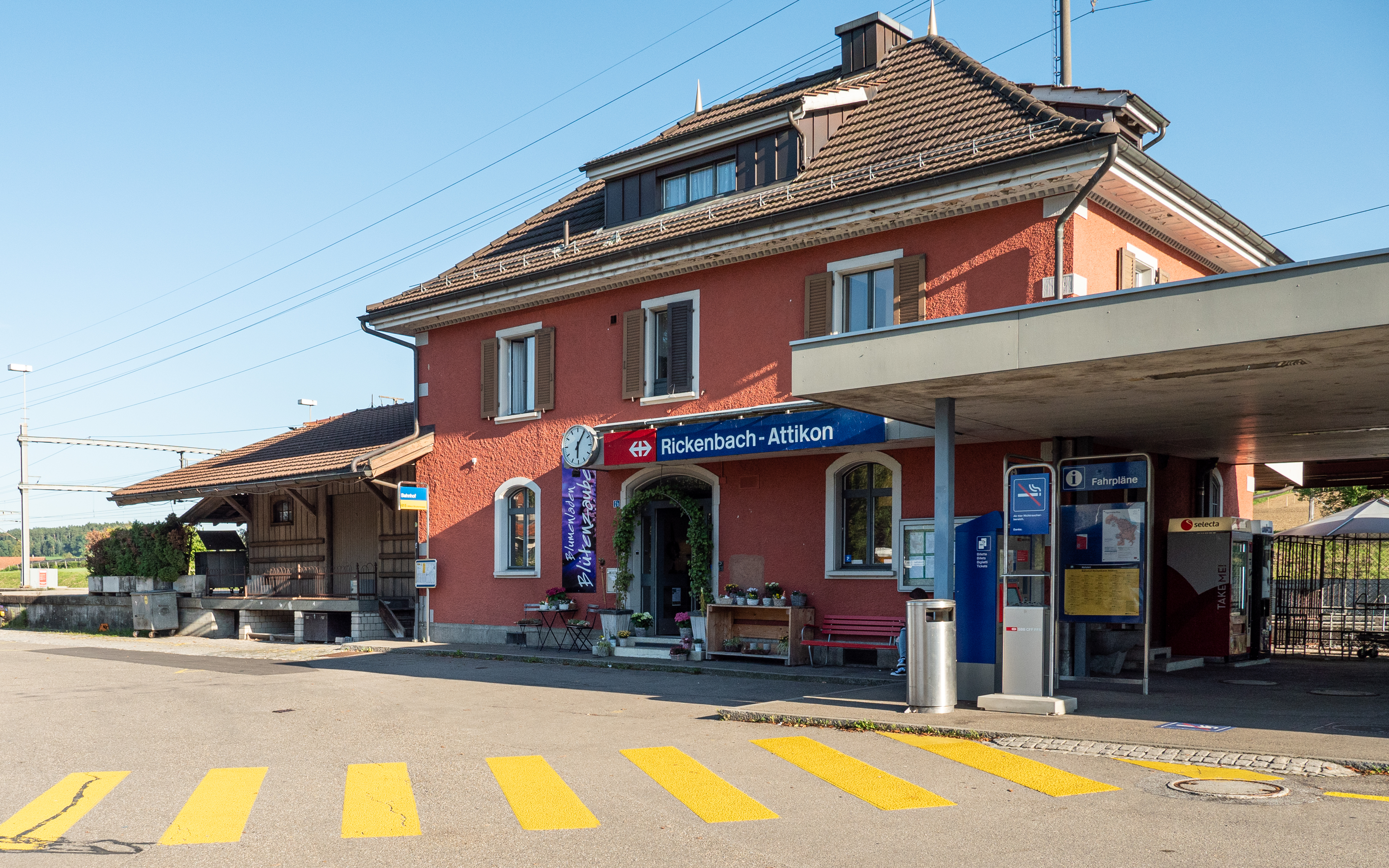
- The station building in 2019

General information
- Location: Stationstrasse; Rickenbach, Zurich; Switzerland
- Coordinates: 47.535124°N 8.789309°E
- Elevation: 472 m (1,549 ft)
- Owner: Swiss Federal Railways
- Operator: Swiss Federal Railways; Thurbo
- Line: Winterthur–Romanshorn

Other information
- Fare zone: 163 (ZVV)

Services
Preceding station	Zurich S-Bahn	Following station
Wiesendangen towards Zug	S24	Islikon towards Weinfelden
Wiesendangen towards Winterthur	S30	Islikon towards Weinfelden
Preceding station	St. Gallen S-Bahn	Following station
Wiesendangen towards Winterthur	SN30 Limited service	Islikon towards Romanshorn
Location
- Location within Switzerland Location within Canton of Zurich

Rickenbach-Attikon is a railway station in the Swiss canton of Zurich and municipality of Rickenbach. It takes its name from that municipality, and the adjacent village of Attikon, in the municipality of Wiesendangen. The station is located on the Winterthur–Romanshorn railway line, within fare zone 163 of the Zürcher Verkehrsverbund (ZVV).

== Services ==
Rickenbach-Attikon station is an intermediate stop on Zurich S-Bahn services S24 and S30.

- Zurich S-Bahn:
  - S24 Thayngen/Weinfelden–Winterthur–Zürich Flughafen –Wipkingen–Zürich HB–Thalwil–Zug
    Services stop in Kemptthal until 9:20 PM; the lines to Thayngen and Weinfelden are operated alternately at hourly intervals; stops between Neuhausen and Winterthur only in Andelfingen.
  - S30 Winterthur–Frauenfeld–Weinfelden (–Romanshorn–Rorschach)

During weekends, the station is served by a nighttime S-Bahn service (SN30), offered by Ostwind fare network, and operated by Thurbo for St. Gallen S-Bahn.

- St. Gallen S-Bahn SN30: hourly service to Winterthur and to Romanshorn (via Weinfelden).

== See also ==
- Rail transport in Switzerland
