= Islikon railway station =

Railway station in Gachnang, Switzerland

Islikon
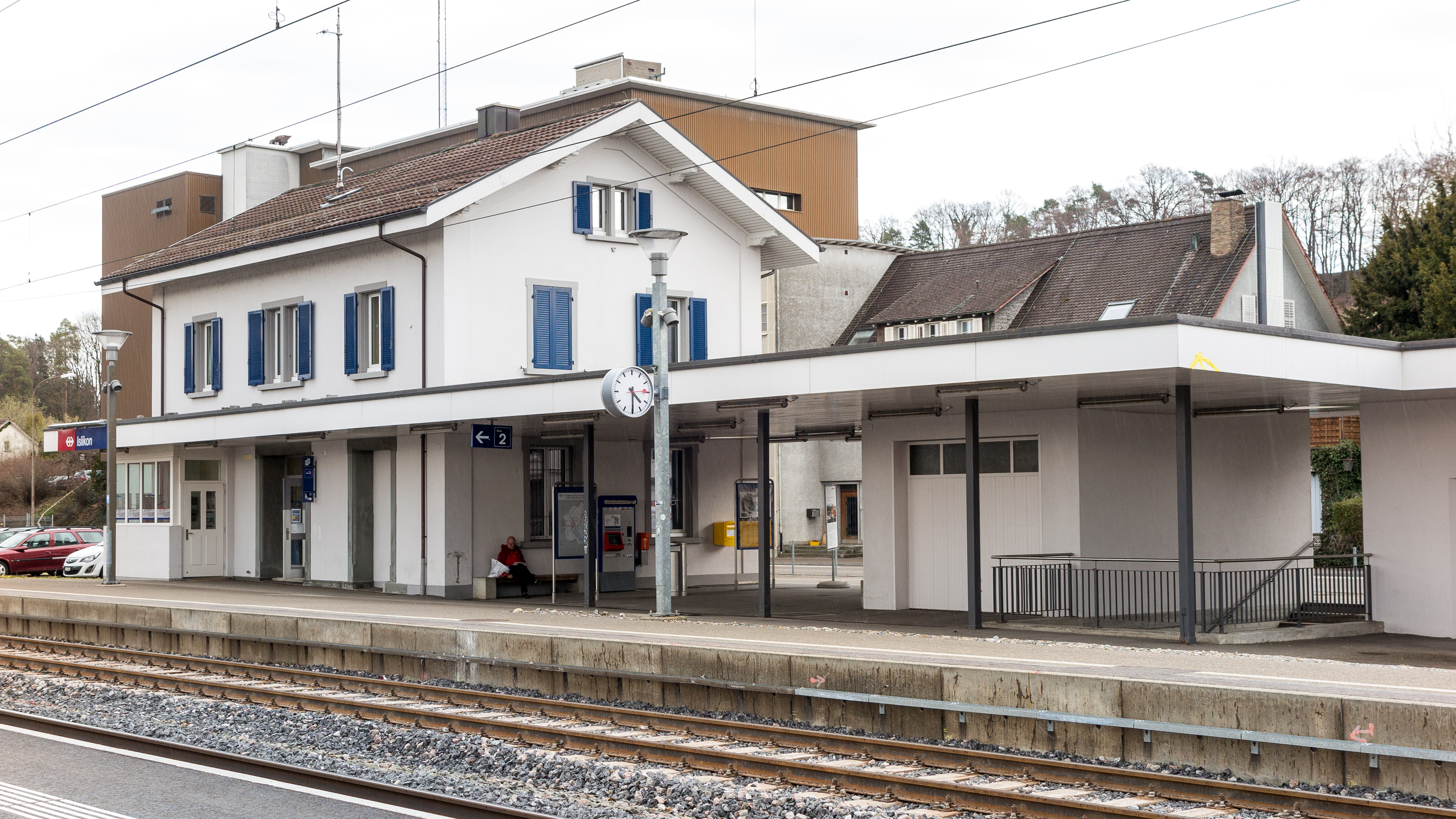
- The station building in 2018

General information
- Location: Hauptstrasse, Islikon, Gachnang, Canton of Thurgau, Switzerland
- Coordinates: 47.546959°N 8.843393°E
- Elevation: 423 m (1,388 ft)
- Owner: Swiss Federal Railways
- Operator: Swiss Federal Railways; Thurbo
- Line: Winterthur–Romanshorn

Other information
- Fare zone: 921 (Tarifverbund Ostwind)

Services
Preceding station	Zurich S-Bahn	Following station
Rickenbach-Attikon towards Zug	S24	Frauenfeld towards Weinfelden
Rickenbach-Attikon towards Winterthur	S30	Frauenfeld towards Weinfelden
Preceding station	St. Gallen S-Bahn	Following station
Rickenbach-Attikon towards Winterthur	SN30 Limited service	Frauenfeld towards Romanshorn
Location
- Location within Switzerland Location within Canton of Thurgau

Islikon railway station, or Gachnang-Islikon railway station, is a railway station in the Swiss canton of Thurgau and municipality of Gachnang. It takes its name from the adjacent village of Islikon. The station is located on the Winterthur–Romanshorn railway line, within fare zone 921 of the Ostwind tariff network (Tarifverbund Ostwind).

== Services ==
The station is an intermediate stop on Zürich S-Bahn services S24 and S30.

- Zurich S-Bahn:
  - S24 Thayngen/Weinfelden–Winterthur–Zürich Flughafen –Wipkingen–Zürich HB–Thalwil–Zug
    Services stop in Kemptthal until 9:20 PM; the lines to Thayngen and Weinfelden are operated alternately at hourly intervals; stops between Neuhausen and Winterthur only in Andelfingen.
  - S30 Winterthur–Frauenfeld–Weinfelden (–Romanshorn–Rorschach)

During weekends, Islikon station is served by a nighttime S-Bahn service (SN30), offered by Ostwind tariff network, and operated by Thurbo for St. Gallen S-Bahn.

- St. Gallen S-Bahn SN30: hourly service to Winterthur and to Romanshorn (via Weinfelden).

== See also ==
- Rail transport in Switzerland
