= Wiesendangen railway station =

Railway station in Wiesendangen, Switzerland

Wiesendangen

General information
- Location: Stationstrasse; Wiesendangen, Zurich; Switzerland
- Coordinates: 47.525616°N 8.776172°E
- Elevation: 470 m (1,540 ft)
- Owner: Swiss Federal Railways
- Operator: Swiss Federal Railways; Thurbo
- Line: Winterthur–Romanshorn

Other information
- Fare zone: 163 (ZVV)

Services
Preceding station	Zurich S-Bahn	Following station
Oberwinterthur towards Zug	S24	Rickenbach-Attikon towards Weinfelden
Oberwinterthur towards Winterthur	S30	Rickenbach-Attikon towards Weinfelden
Preceding station	St. Gallen S-Bahn	Following station
Oberwinterthur towards Winterthur	SN30 Limited service	Rickenbach-Attikon towards Romanshorn
Location
- Location within Switzerland Location within Canton of Zurich

Wiesendangen is a railway station in the Swiss canton of Zurich and municipality of Wiesendangen. The station is located on the Winterthur–Romanshorn railway line, within fare zone 163 of the Zürcher Verkehrsverbund (ZVV).

== Service ==
Wiesendangen station is an intermediate stop on Zurich S-Bahn services S24 and S30.

- Zurich S-Bahn:
  - S24 Thayngen/Weinfelden–Winterthur–Zürich Flughafen –Wipkingen–Zürich HB–Thalwil–Zug
    Services stop in Kemptthal until 9:20 PM; the lines to Thayngen and Weinfelden are operated alternately at hourly intervals; stops between Neuhausen and Winterthur only in Andelfingen.
  - S30 Winterthur–Frauenfeld–Weinfelden (–Romanshorn–Rorschach)

During weekends, the station is served by a nighttime S-Bahn service (SN30), offered by Ostwind fare network, and operated by Thurbo for St. Gallen S-Bahn.

- St. Gallen S-Bahn SN30: hourly service to Winterthur and to Romanshorn (via Weinfelden).

== See also ==
- Rail transport in Switzerland
