= Felben-Wellhausen railway station =

Railway station in Switzerland

Felben-Wellhausen
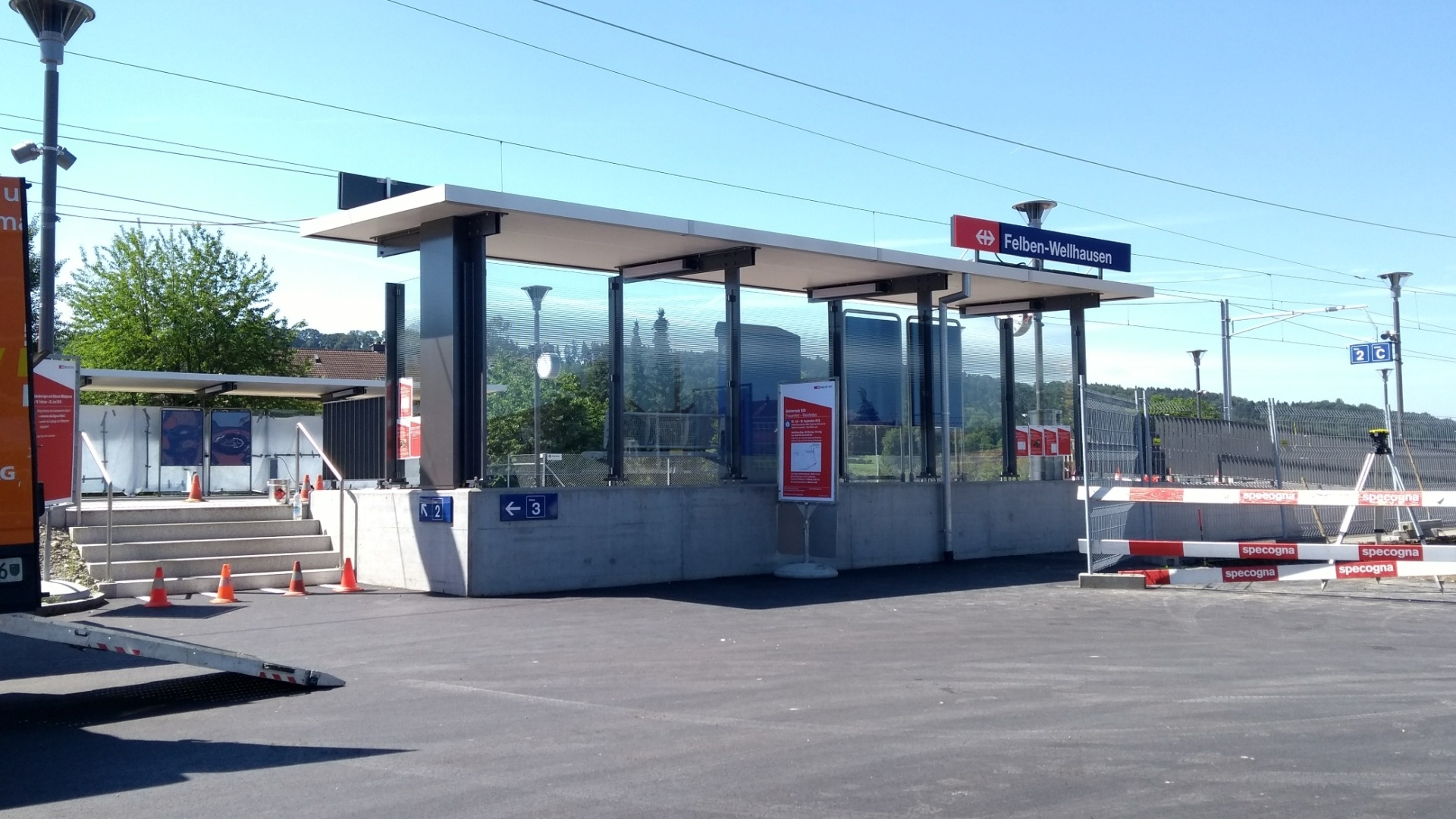

General information
- Location: Poststrasse; Felben-Wellhausen, Thurgau; Switzerland
- Coordinates: 47.576728°N 8.943161°E
- Elevation: 399 m (1,309 ft)
- Owner: Swiss Federal Railways
- Operator: Swiss Federal Railways; Thurbo
- Line: Winterthur–Romanshorn

Other information
- Fare zone: 922 (Tarifverbund Ostwind)

Services
Preceding station	Zurich S-Bahn	Following station
Frauenfeld towards Zug	S24	Hüttlingen-Mettendorf towards Weinfelden
Frauenfeld towards Winterthur	S30	Hüttlingen-Mettendorf towards Weinfelden
Preceding station	St. Gallen S-Bahn	Following station
Frauenfeld towards Winterthur	SN30 Limited service	Hüttlingen-Mettendorf towards Romanshorn
Location
- Location within Switzerland Location within Canton of Thurgau

Felben-Wellhausen railway station is a railway station in the Swiss canton of Thurgau and municipality of Felben-Wellhausen. The station is located on the Winterthur–Romanshorn railway line, within fare zone 922 of the Ostwind tariff network (Tarifverbund Ostwind).

== Services ==
The station is an intermediate stop on Zurich S-Bahn services S24 and S30.

- Zurich S-Bahn:
  - S24 Thayngen/Weinfelden–Winterthur–Zürich Flughafen –Wipkingen–Zürich HB–Thalwil–Zug
    Services stop in Kemptthal until 9:20 PM; the lines to Thayngen and Weinfelden are operated alternately at hourly intervals; stops between Neuhausen and Winterthur only in Andelfingen.
  - S30 Winterthur–Frauenfeld–Weinfelden (–Romanshorn–Rorschach)

During weekends, the station is served by a nighttime S-Bahn service (SN30), offered by Ostwind tariff network, and operated by Thurbo for St. Gallen S-Bahn.

- St. Gallen S-Bahn SN30: hourly service to Winterthur and to Romanshorn (via Weinfelden).

== See also ==
- Rail transport in Switzerland
