= Hüttlingen-Mettendorf railway station =

Railway station in Hüttlingen, Switzerland

Hüttlingen-Mettendorf
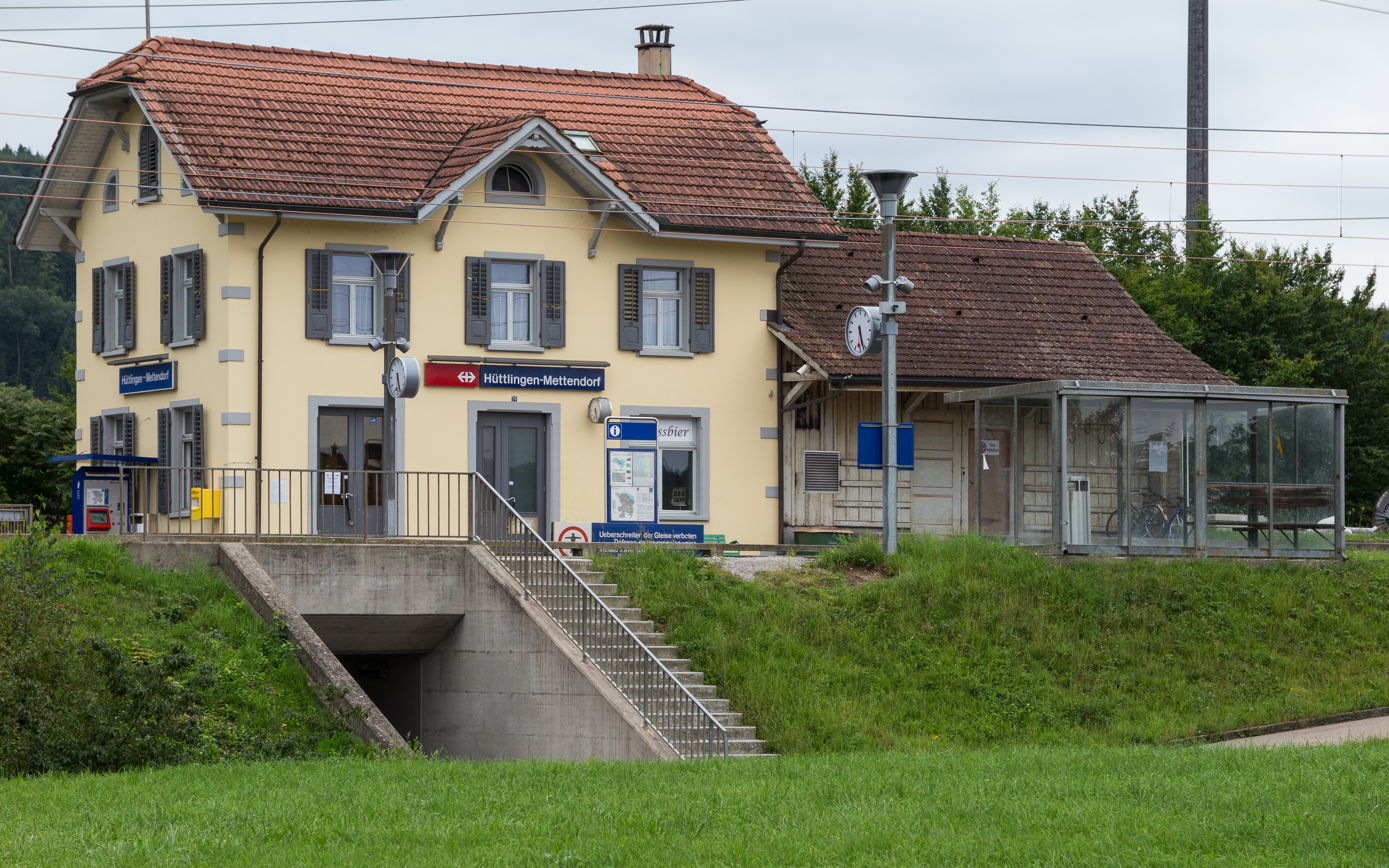

General information
- Location: Bahnhofstrasse; Hüttlingen, Thurgau; Switzerland
- Coordinates: 47.581983°N 8.975079°E
- Elevation: 403 m (1,322 ft)
- Owner: Swiss Federal Railways
- Operator: Swiss Federal Railways; Thurbo
- Line: Winterthur–Romanshorn

Other information
- Fare zone: 922 (Tarifverbund Ostwind)

Services
Preceding station	Zurich S-Bahn	Following station
Felben-Wellhausen towards Zug	S24	Müllheim-Wigoltingen towards Weinfelden
Felben-Wellhausen towards Winterthur	S30	Müllheim-Wigoltingen towards Weinfelden
Preceding station	St. Gallen S-Bahn	Following station
Felben-Wellhausen towards Winterthur	SN30 Limited service	Müllheim-Wigoltingen towards Romanshorn
Location
- Location within Switzerland Location within Canton of Thurgau

Hüttlingen-Mettendorf railway station is a railway station in the Swiss canton of Thurgau and municipality of Hüttlingen. The station is located on the Winterthur–Romanshorn railway line, within fare zone 922 of the Ostwind tariff network (Tarifverbund Ostwind).

== Services ==
The station is an intermediate stop on Zurich S-Bahn services S24 and S30.

- Zurich S-Bahn:
  - S24 Thayngen/Weinfelden–Winterthur–Zürich Flughafen –Wipkingen–Zürich HB–Thalwil–Zug
    Services stop in Kemptthal until 9:20 PM; the lines to Thayngen and Weinfelden are operated alternately at hourly intervals; stops between Neuhausen and Winterthur only in Andelfingen.
  - S30 Winterthur–Frauenfeld–Weinfelden (–Romanshorn–Rorschach)

During weekends, the station is served by a nighttime S-Bahn service (SN30), offered by Ostwind tariff network, and operated by Thurbo for St. Gallen S-Bahn.

- St. Gallen S-Bahn SN30: hourly service to Winterthur and to Romanshorn (via Weinfelden).

== See also ==
- Rail transport in Switzerland
