= Märstetten railway station =

Railway station in Switzerland

Märstetten
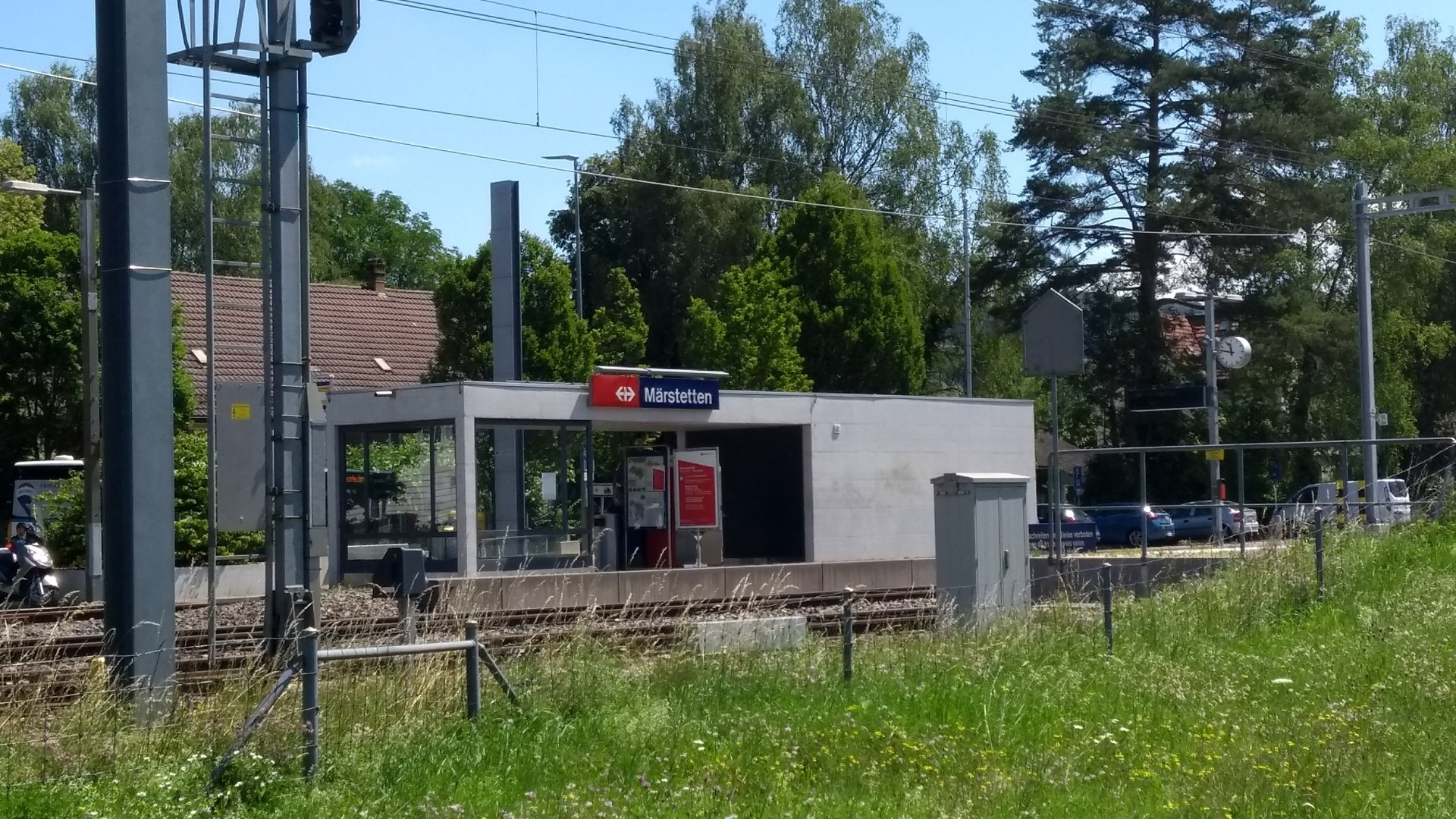
- The station building in 2018

General information
- Location: Märstetten, Thurgau; Switzerland
- Coordinates: 47.583235°N 9.061065°E
- Elevation: 418 m (1,371 ft)
- Owner: Swiss Federal Railways
- Operator: Swiss Federal Railways; Thurbo
- Line: Winterthur–Romanshorn
- Connections
- Bus: PostAuto bus route 833

Other information
- Fare zone: 923 (Tarifverbund Ostwind)

Services
Preceding station	Zurich S-Bahn	Following station
Müllheim-Wigoltingen towards Zug	S24	Weinfelden Terminus
Müllheim-Wigoltingen towards Winterthur	S30	Weinfelden Terminus
Preceding station	St. Gallen S-Bahn	Following station
Müllheim-Wigoltingen towards Winterthur	SN30 Limited service	Weinfelden towards Romanshorn
Location
- Location within Switzerland Location within Canton of Thurgau

Märstetten railway station is a railway station in the Swiss canton of Thurgau and the municipality of Märstetten. The station is located on the Winterthur–Romanshorn railway line, within fare zone 923 of the Ostwind tariff network (Tarifverbund Ostwind).

The railway station is linked with the Conny-Land animal theme park in Lipperswil via a bus line (833).

== Services ==
The station is an intermediate stop on Zurich S-Bahn services S24 and S30.

- Zurich S-Bahn:
  - S24 Thayngen/Weinfelden–Winterthur–Zürich Flughafen –Wipkingen–Zürich HB–Thalwil–Zug
    Services stop in Kemptthal until 9:20 PM; the lines to Thayngen and Weinfelden are operated alternately at hourly intervals; stops between Neuhausen and Winterthur only in Andelfingen.
  - S30 Winterthur–Frauenfeld–Weinfelden (–Romanshorn–Rorschach)

During weekends, the station is served by a nighttime S-Bahn service (SN30), offered by Ostwind tariff network, and operated by Thurbo for St. Gallen S-Bahn.

- St. Gallen S-Bahn SN30: hourly service to Winterthur and to Romanshorn (via Weinfelden).

== See also ==
- Rail transport in Switzerland
