= Johann Jakob Breitinger =

Johann Jakob Breitinger may refer to:

- Johann Jakob Breitinger (Antistes) (1575–1645)
- Johann Jakob Breitinger (architect) (1814–1880)
- Johann Jakob Breitinger (philologist) (1701–1776)
