= Hüttlingen =

Hüttlingen may refer to:

- Hüttlingen, Baden-Württemberg, Germany, town in the German state of Baden-Württemberg, in Ostalbkreis district
- Hüttlingen, Switzerland, municipality in the district of Frauenfeld, in the canton of Thurgau in Switzerland

== See also ==
- Hüttlingen-Mettendorf railway station, railway station in the Swiss canton of Thurgau and municipality of Hüttlingen
- Hüttingen (disambiguation)
