= S30 (ZVV) =

Railway service in Switzerland

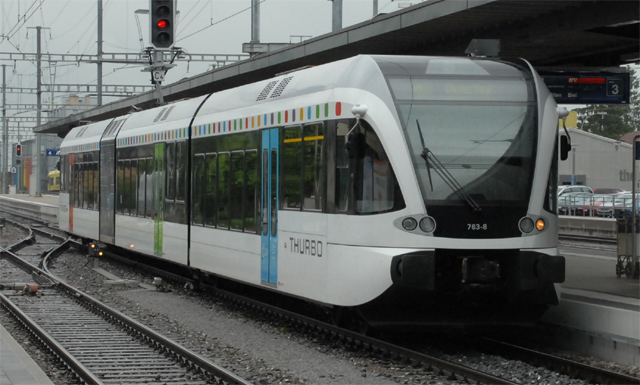
- A Thurbo Stadler GTW at Weinfelden, 2009.

Overview
- Status: Operational
- Locale: Switzerland
- Termini: Winterthur HB; Weinfelden (TG)
- Website: ZVV (in English)

Service
- Type: S-Bahn
- System: Zurich S-Bahn
- Operator(s): Zürcher Verkehrsverbund (ZVV)
- Rolling stock: Thurbo rolling stock

Technical
- Track gauge: 1,435 mm (4 ft 8 1/2 in)

Zürich S-Bahn network as of December 2018

The S30 is a regional railway line of the Zurich S-Bahn on the ZVV (Zürich transportation network). It connects the cantons of Zurich and Thurgau, Switzerland, with some services extending to the canton of St. Gallen.

== Route ==
- S30 Winterthur–Frauenfeld–Weinfelden (–Romanshorn–Rorschach)

The line runs from Winterthur, canton of Zürich, via Frauenfeld, canton of Thurgau, to Weinfelden, also in Thurgau.

Some services also extend to Romanshorn, Thurgau, and Rorschach, in the canton of St. Gallen.

== Stations ==
- Winterthur Hauptbahnhof
- Oberwinterthur
- Wiesendangen
- Rickenbach-Attikon
- Islikon
- Frauenfeld
- Felben-Wellhausen
- Hüttlingen-Mettendorf
- Müllheim-Wigoltingen
- Märstetten
- Weinfelden

== Rolling stock ==
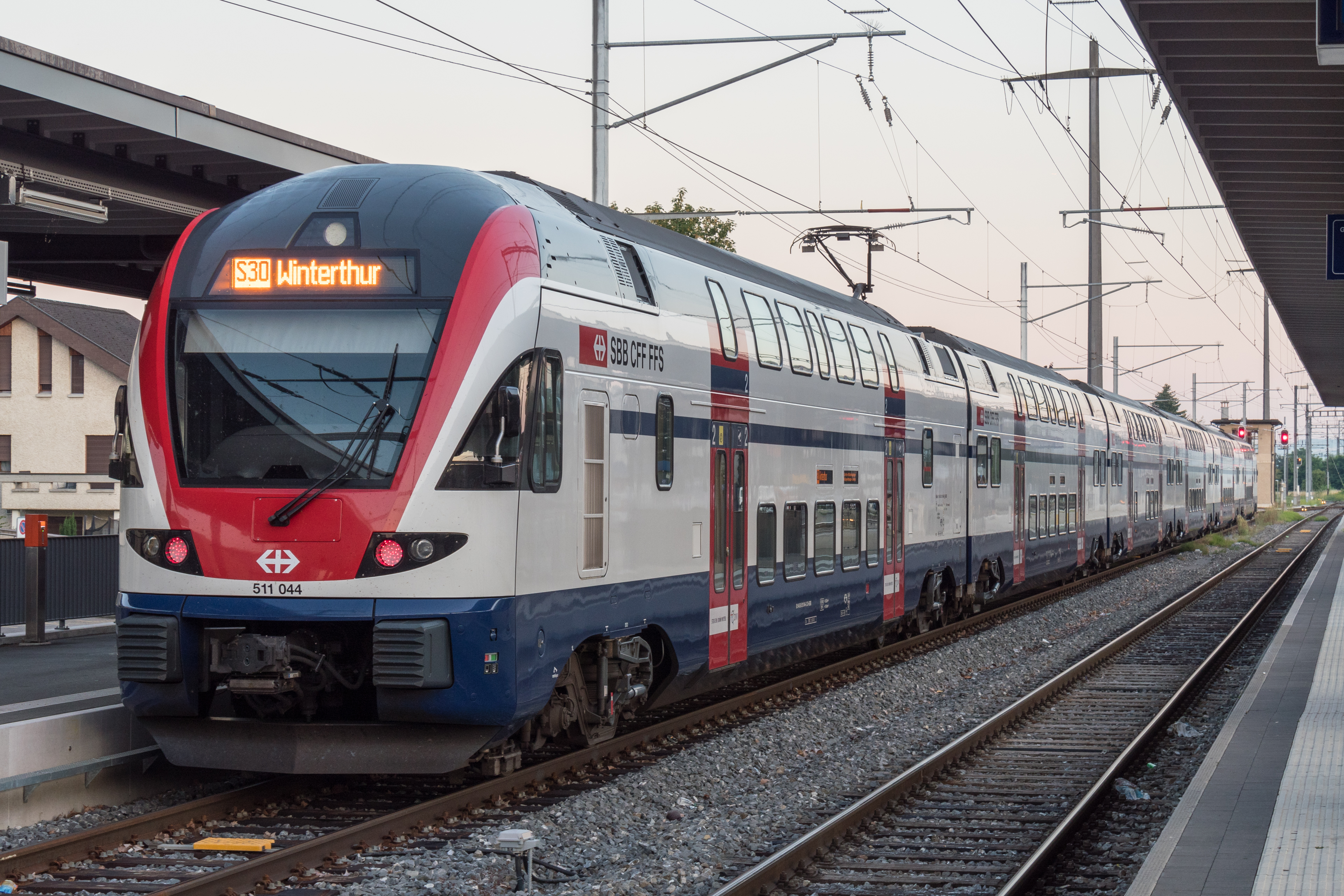
RABe 511 operating as S30 at Weinfelden station in 2019

Most services are operated by THURBO rolling stock. Some are operated using RABe 511 doubledecker trainsets.

== Scheduling ==
The train frequency is usually one every 60 minutes.

== See also ==
- Rail transport in Switzerland
- Public transport in Zurich
- ZVV fare zones
