= S44 (St. Gallen S-Bahn) =

Railway in Switzerland and Germany

Overview
- First service: 11 December 2022
- Current operator(s): THURBO

Route
- Termini: Konstanz; Weinfelden
- Stops: 3
- Distance travelled: 22.8 kilometres (14.2 mi)
- Average journey time: 24 minutes
- Service frequency: Every 2 hours
- Line(s) used: Wil–Kreuzlingen line; High Rhine line

The S44 is a railway service of the St. Gallen S-Bahn that runs every two hours between Weinfelden, in the Swiss canton of Thurgau, and Konstanz in southern Germany. The line is also part of the Bodensee S-Bahn. THURBO, a joint venture of Swiss Federal Railways and the canton of Thurgau, operates the service.

== Operations ==
The S44 runs every two hours between Weinfelden and Konstanz. It makes one intermediate stop in Kreuzlingen. In Weinfelden, the S44 connects with the IC 8, which operates to Interlaken Ost via Zürich Hauptbahnhof. The hourly Lucerne–Konstanz InterRegio 75 and half-hourly S14 provide frequent service between Weinfelden and Konstanz.

== Route ==
S44 Weinfelden – Konstanz

- Weinfelden
- Kreuzlingen
- Konstanz

== History ==
The S44 began operation with the 11 December 2022 timetable change. Track capacity constraints limit operation to every two hours; future plans call for increased service.
