= Winterthur–Romanshorn railway =

Railway line in Switzerland (opened 1855)

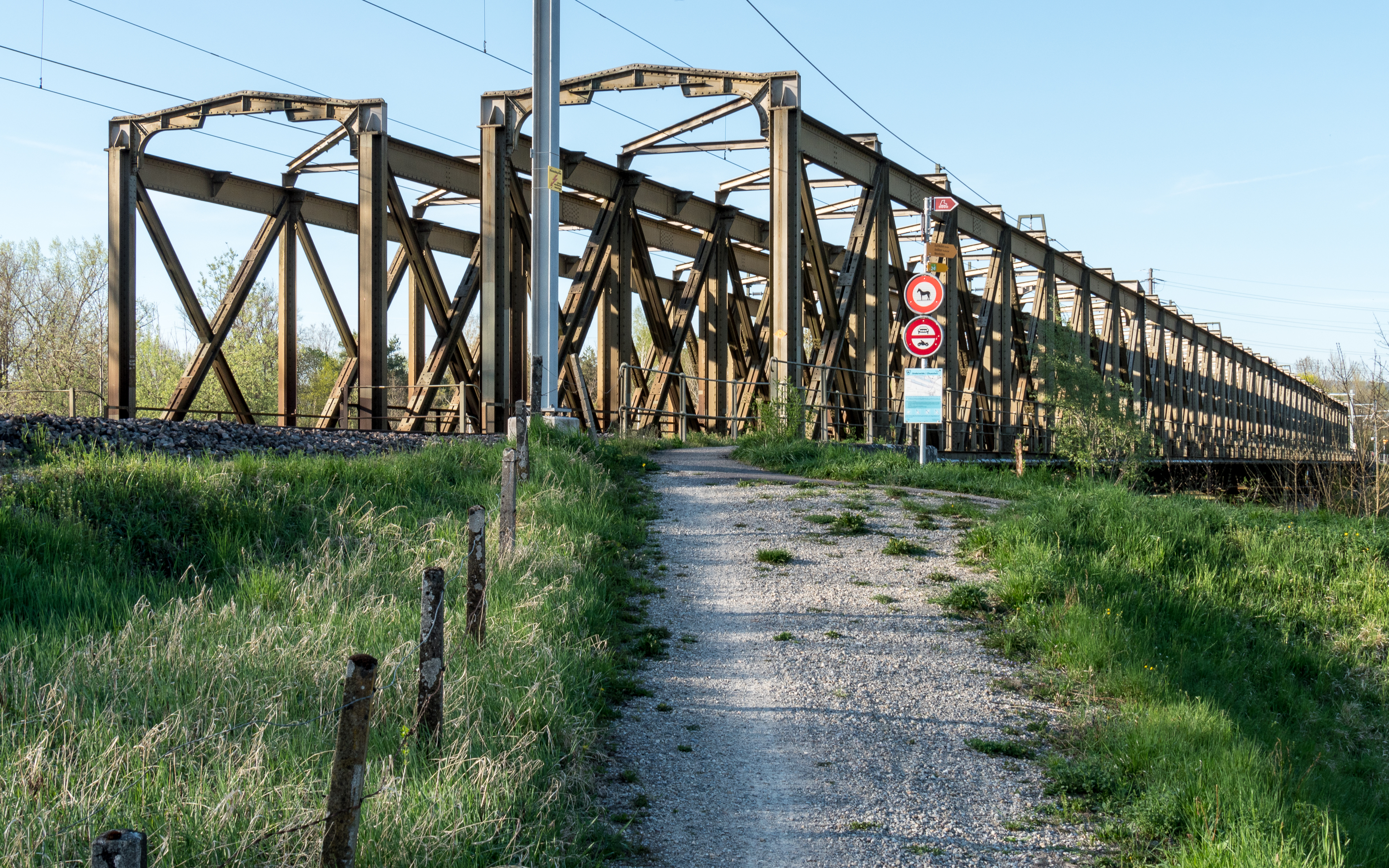
- Bridge over the Thur at Eschikof

Overview
- Native name: Thurtallinie
- Line number: 840
- Locale: Switzerland
- Termini: Winterthur; Romanshorn

Technical
- Line length: 53.1 km (33.0 mi)
- Track gauge: 1,435 mm (4 ft 8 1/2 in)
- Electrification: 15 kV/16.7 Hz AC overhead catenary
- Operating speed: 125 km/h (78 mph)
- Maximum incline: 1.4%

The Winterthur–Romanshorn railway, also known in German as the Thurtallinie ("Thur valley line"), is a Swiss railway line and was built as part of the railway between Zürich and Lake Constance (Bodensee). It connects Winterthur with Romanshorn, where it formerly connected to train ferries over Lake Constance. It is the fourth oldest internal railway in Switzerland. Its construction was to be funded by the Zürich-Lake Constance Railway (Zürich-Bodenseebahn), but during the construction the company was merged with the Swiss Northern Railway (Schweizerische Nordbahn) to form the Swiss Northeastern Railway (Schweizerische Nordostbahn, NOB). The Winterthur–Romanshorn railway was opened on 16 May 1855 and the line from Winterthur to Oerlikon was opened on 27 December 1855. Zürich was reached on 26 June 1856 and the two existing NOB lines were connected.

The Lake Constance train ferries on the Romanshorn–Friedrichshafen and Romanshorn–Lindau routes were established to connect with this line.

== History ==
The line's genesis goes back to one of the oldest Swiss railway projects: an Eastern Railway (Ostbahn, Zürich–Lake Constance) project was developed as early as 1836. This project, like the Northern Railway (Nordbahn, Zürich–Basel) and the Southern Railway (Südbahn, Zürich–Chur) was developed by Alois Negrelli and was to run from Winterthur via Frauenfeld to Romanshorn, while a slightly different route was proposed between Zürich and Winterthur. in Zürich for example, a separate station was planned in the Oberstrass area. From there, the line ran around the Zürichberg to Stettbach, to cross the Glatt at Dübendorf. Then it went via Hegnau and Kindhausen to Rikon, now a district of Effretikon. After that, the line would have largely followed the route of the current railway. Negrelli himself gave this the least chance of financial success of the three projects he had designed. Any chance of the project proceeding ended with the political change of 1839 when the liberal forces in the canton of Zürich were ousted by the conservatives. Negrelli left Zürich in 1840 and worked in Austria at the Emperor Ferdinand Northern Railway as Inspector General. He later came back to Switzerland, but he was only involved in the construction of the Northern Railway.

The political situation in Switzerland at that time was not favourable for the building of railways, but it was dominated by the conflict between the Catholics and Protestants, which culminated in the Sonderbund War of 1847. The situation changed fundamentally only with the new national constitution and the abolition of domestic tariffs. Alfred Escher, who was at the centre of Swiss politics and would have a major influence on the railway history of Switzerland, was elected to the first Swiss parliament in 1848. His political philosophy was usually described as a legalradikal (legal radical), but this is an inaccurate description of his politics: he was a supporter of what we understand today as a free market economy. He knew that healthy financial growth was only possible through improved transport links with other markets, and for that the railway was the tool of the times. He is considered one of the main advocates of the 1852 Railway Act (Eisenbahngesetz), which put the construction of railways in private hands.

The Winterthur–Romanshorn railway was his first major project and the Zürich-Lake Constance Railway was authorised to build it on 28 February 1853. The first president of the Zürich-Bodenseebahn-Gesellschaft, Melchior Ziegler, was soon replaced by Escher. An agreement for the Swiss Northern Railway to merge with the Zürich-Lake Constance railway to form the Swiss Northeast Railway was signed by Escher on behalf of the Zürich-Lake Constance Railway, as newly appointed director of the Northeastern Railway and as the president of the canton of Zürich.

While the determination of the final route had begun in 1850, the final alignments for all sections were not determined until 1853, meaning that in some places construction began immediately after the determination of the route. In addition to the terminuses in Romanshorn and Zürich the plans included the following stations: Amriswil, Riedt, Bürglen, Weinfelden, Märstetten, Felben, Frauenfeld, Islikon, Ruchegg, Winterthur, Rikon (Effretikon), Wallisellen and Oerlikon. Two of these stations were relocated: Wiesendangen replaced Ruchegg and Sulgen replaced Riedt. The local authorities have called for additional stations, but only the two requests that promised additional freight traffic were acted on. It was agreed to build industrial connections from the line to the copper mill in Kupferhammer near Kemptthal and at Haslimühle in Müllheim-Wigoltingen. Stations at Oberach, Hüttingen, Oberwinterthur and Baltenswil, which were primarily intended to benefit the local population, were all rejected.

The Winterthur–Romanshorn railway was built as a single track and opened on 16 May 1855. Preparations for duplication had been made during the planning, but duplication did not begin until the line was taken over by the SBB. The two parallel tracks between Winterthur and Oberwinterthur, which were built separately by the NOB and SNB, were merged in 1903 to form a double-track line. The foundation for the second track had to be built on the rest of the line first. The sections of double-track were opened in the following order:

- Frauenfeld–Müllheim on 1 October 1905
- Oberwinterthur–Wiesendangen on 1 May 1906
- Islikon–Frauenfeld on 1 May 1906
- Müllheim–Sulgen on 1 May 1907.
- Sulgen–Amriswil on 1 July 1907
- Wiesendangen–Islikon on 4 July 1907
- Amriswil–Romanshorn on 30 September 1907

The line was used by the world's first diesel-powered locomotive (a diesel-mechanical locomotive) in the summer of 1912, but it was not a commercial success.

As a main line, it was quickly electrified by the SBB with its normal power system of 15 kV AC 16.7 Hz. Electrical operations on the Winterthur–Romanshorn line commenced on 4 May 1928.

== Route and stations ==
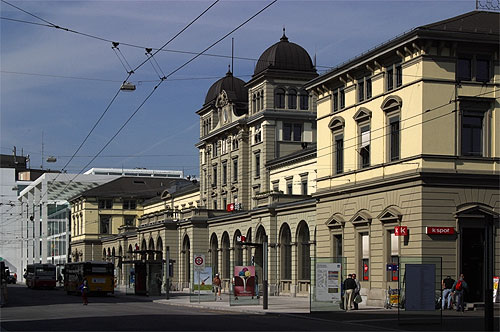
Winterthur station

Winterthur station was built west of the Altstadt (old town). Running towards Romanshorn, the Thur valley line curves to the right, while the line to Schaffhausen branches off to the left. The Winterthur depot was built in the resulting triangle, but it now has only minor importance apart from the stationing of a fire and rescue train. The work of the depot has been outsourced to the S-Bahn depot in Oberwinterthur. The line on the exit from Winterthur station along the Stadtrain has been quadrupled. The former track of the Zürich-Lake Constance Railway is now the second northernmost. After completing the four tracks to Oberwinterthur and Grüze, a separate track was created for each rail company and line. In 1903, the two adjacent track tracks between Winterthur and Oberwinterthur were merged to create a genuine double-track line. After it has separated with a left turn from the lines to St. Gallen and to the Töss valley, the Romanshorn line reaches Oberwinterthur station. This was built in 1875 by the National Railway; its line from Etzwilen used the Lake Constance Railway’s route from here to Winterthur. The Baroque Revival station building was built by the Swiss Federal Railways (Schweizerische Bundesbahnen, SBB). With the opening of the Zürich S-Bahn in 1990, the seven-hectare Oberwinterthur maintenance facility was opened south of the line towards Romanshorn. On the other side of the track is the Swiss Science Center Technorama.

Wiesendangen station came to public notice in 1975 when the SBB had the unique and valuable building in the Swiss chalet style demolished at 5 AM on a Monday. The high-point of this section is reached between Wiesendangen and Rickenbach.

The Rickenbach-Attikon station building dates back to 1907, this station was only opened on 15 October 1907. After Attikon, the Winterthur–Romanshorn line runs over a three kilometre-long embankment while descending 85 metres to the Thur valley.

Islikon station is now operated on the Stationshalter (station holder) model and still has the station building of 1873. After Islikon station, a siding branches off to the north to the Frauenfeld sugar factory, the large-scale facilities of which are built next to the Winterthur–Romanshorn line until shortly before the town of Frauenfeld.

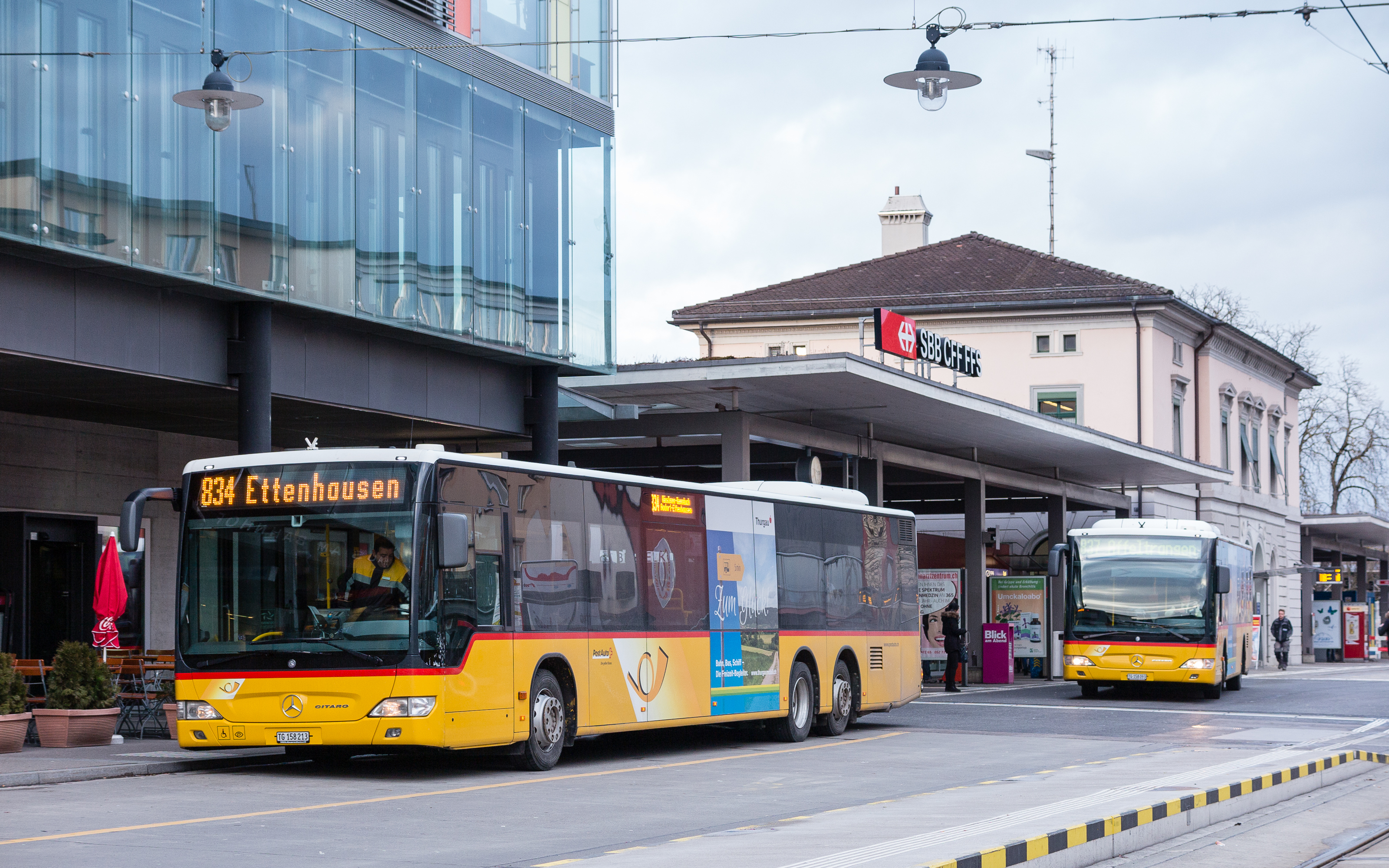
Frauenfeld station

Frauenfeld station, which serves the capital of the canton of Thurgau, has a large and stately entrance building. Trains on the Frauenfeld–Wil railway have departed from the station forecourt since 1887. The station was extensively expanded with the establishment of the place-of-arms and rebuilt under the Rail 2000 program, but it was one of the last major stations with ground-level passenger access to the platforms. During the renovation, an underground roundabout was built under the station forecourt, the neo-classical entrance building built in 1859 was carefully renovated and a 420 metre-long island platform was built, which is covered by Switzerland's second longest platform canopy. While the goods shed was demolished, the neo-classical military warehouse building was converted into a park-and-ride garage. The locomotive shed built in 1890 is now used by the SBB construction service.

A siding connects to the Frauenfeld parcel post centre, which was opened in 1999 on the northern side of the line.

Felben-Wellhausen station probably has the first goods shed on the line, with parts of it built in 1855. The present entrance building was built in 1873.

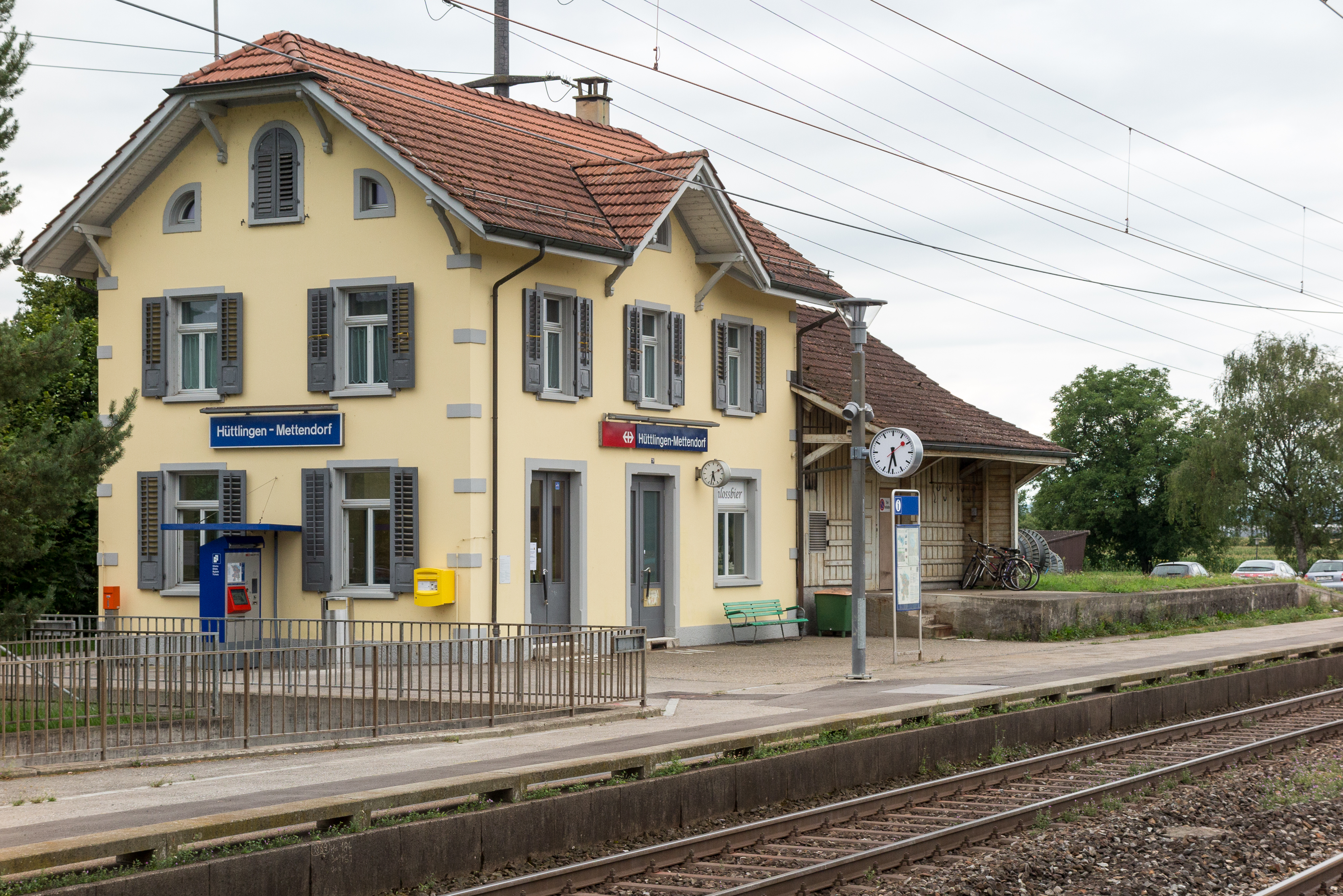
Hüttlingen-Mettendorf station

Hüttligen-Mettendorf station developed from a halt to a station and has been downgraded to a halt again. The line crosses the Thur before Müllheim-Wigoltingen station. The Winterthur–Romanshorn line makes an S-curve, in the middle of which is the Eschikof bridge. The initially single-track covered bridge was replaced during the duplication of the track in 1903 by a new bridge that consists of two adjoining 174 metre-long steel truss bridges.

Müllheim-Wigoltingen station was built with a medium-sized entrance building. A goods shed was added to this in 1862 and it was extended in 1871. A waiting room annex was built on the other side in 1894. On 19 May 1863, there was a collision between a passing express train with a stopping passenger train in the station due to wrongly-set points. Two railway employees were injured so severely that they died and another survived seriously injured. An unspecified number of passengers were slightly injured, although their carriages were smashed.

Märstetten station received a shelter in 2001 under the Facelifting Stationen program.

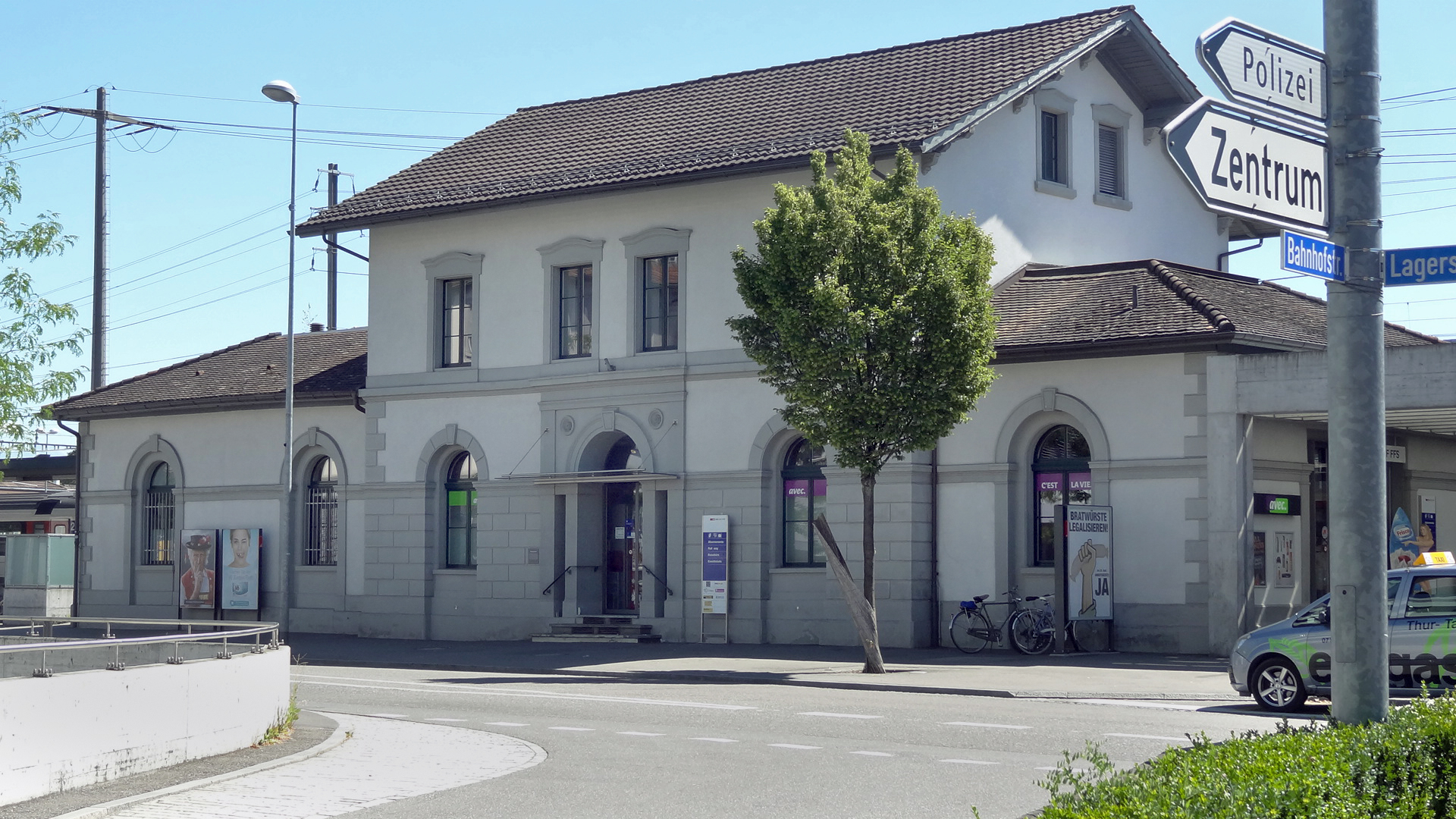
Weinfelden station

Weinfelden station has been a railway junction since 1911, when, the Mittelthurgaubahn company opened the Wil–Kreuzlingen railway. The company established its depot here and its line crosses the Winterthur–Romanshorn line.

Bürglen station received a medium-sized entrance building with a gable that faced the track in 1866.

Sulgen station has been a junction station since 1876. The Bischofszellerbahn company, which opened the Sulgen–Gossau railway on 1 February between Sulgen and Bischofszell-Stadt, also built a locomotive shed at the station. This is now the home of a branch of Eurovapor.

Erlen station has a converted station building that was originally built in 1873 and the goods shed built in 1859 still exists.

Oberaach station still has a station building built in 1907, but it has been privatised. The station itself was only opened on 1 February 1908. The station was closed for passenger traffic in 2001 and replaced by a new station of the same name a few hundred metres to the east. This avoided the need to construct a passenger underpass, because the road overpass can be used for access.

Amriswil station was already equipped in 1855 with a freight yard and in 1867 with a stately station building. The station building was demolished in modern times and the freight tracks were dismantled. Since 2004, it has only been a halt from a railway technical point of view. The station building is now a functional, single-storey building with a flat roof, but it is still occupied commercially and still includes a travel agency and money transfer service.

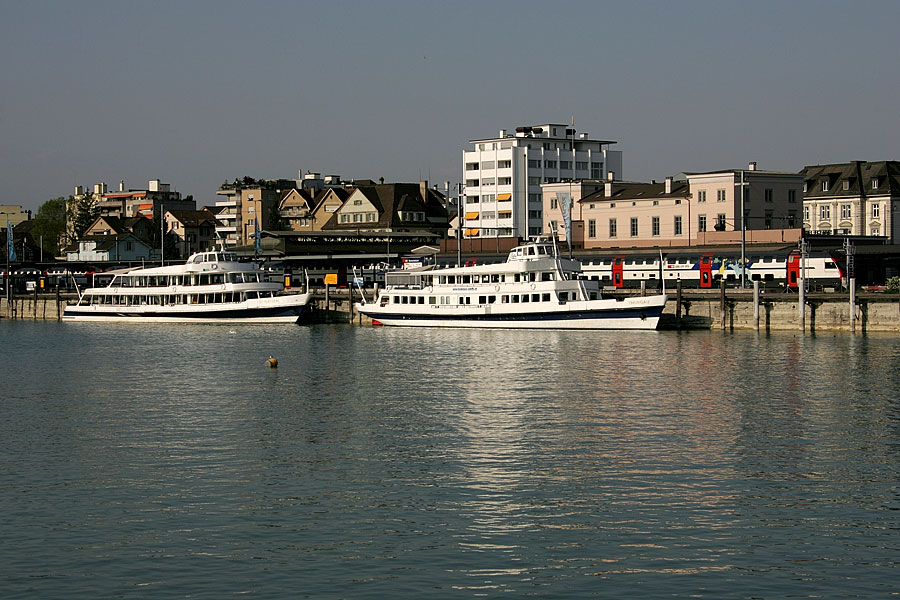
Romanshorn station

Romanshorn station is a terminus at a port and has an extensive track layout and a train depot. The Romanshorn marshalling yard, which is located on the line to Romanshorn and was opened on 15 October 1869, was closed in 1997. Trains from the line from Winterthur gained access to the yard via a connecting loop; the depot is located in the triangle of tracks thus formed. This single-track line is still used today by the freight trains from the upper Rhine Valley and Rorschach towards the Limmattal marshalling yard, but not by scheduled passenger trains. The passenger station was completely renewed in 2004, while the entrance building, which was built between 1853 and 1855, has been preserved.

== Operations ==
The Winterthur–Romanshorn railway has always been used by fast trains on the Zürich–Romanshorn route (in 2010, InterCity trains ran between Romanshorn and Brig) and Regional trains on the Winterthur–Romanshorn route. Since the introduction of Rail 2000, an express has run on the Zürich–Weinfelden–Konstanz route (in 2010, an InterRegio service had run on the Konstanz–Biel/Bienne route) has been added. Both services are occasionally run as tilting train (ICN) services with RABDe 500 sets, but are usually run as commuter trains with Re 460 locomotives and Einheitswagen IV or IC2000 coaches. Regional services have terminated in Weinfelden since the introduction of the St. Gallen S-Bahn: since then the regional trains designated as the S7 have run from Romanshorn to Weinfelden, while the regional services of the Zürich S-Bahn, now called the S30, run only between Weinfelden and Winterthur. For this purpose, the S30 is supplemented during the day from Monday to Friday by the extended S8 (Zürich S-Bahn) service running on a fairly irregular half-hourly pattern. S5 (S-Bahn St. Gallen) services were also added between Sulgen and Weinfelden, continuing on the Sulgen–Gossau railway.

There are additional night S-Bahn services during the nights from Friday to Saturday and from Saturday to Sunday.

The Thur valley line has lost some importance for freight transport since the closure of the marshalling yard in Romanshorn. Nevertheless, freight trains from the Rhine Valley and from Lake Constance are routed to Limmattal marshalling yard, as Buchs marshalling yard serves only as a distributing point, but not as a collecting point for national single-wagon traffic. As a transit route, it is only used by trains destined to Wolfurt marshalling yard. Freight trains across the Arlberg usually use the border crossing at Buchs. In addition, several parcel post trains run to the parcel post centre in Frauenfeld and every autumn many sugar beet trains run to the Frauenfeld sugar factory.

The Thur valley line is often used by experimental trains and new trains being tested because it has enough capacity and enough alternative tracks and sidings that can be easily used outside the sugar beet season.

== Modernisation ==
At the moment (2015–2017), the Winterthur–Romanshorn railway is being modernised from Winterthur to Weinfelden in order to increase the maximum speed from 125 km/h to 150 km/h. The travel time should be shortened by five minutes. The straightening of a section of track that was originally planned was omitted for cost reasons.
