= Hüttingen =

Hüttingen may refer to:

- Hüttingen an der Kyll, municipality in the district of Bitburg-Prüm, in Rhineland-Palatinate, western Germany
- Hüttingen bei Lahr, municipality in the district of Bitburg-Prüm, in Rhineland-Palatinate, western Germany

== See also ==
- Hüttlingen (disambiguation)
