= Johann Jakob Breitinger (architect) =

Swiss architect (1814-1880)

Johann Jakob Breitinger (30 January 1814 – 15 March 1880) was a Swiss architect.

== Early years ==
Johann Jakob Breitinger was born to Protestant parents in Dinhard, a village north of Winterthur in the Canton of Zürich. He was orphaned at an early age, attending school in Horgen and Zürich. In 1830 he embarked on an apprenticeship with the then newly established construction business of Locher & Cie in Zürich. Between 1832 and 1837 he worked as a wandering journeyman in Neuchâtel, Paris and Berlin, though it is unclear whether this period involved any formal further study. There was no appropriate education establishment in Neuchâtel, although in Berlin the Bauakademie (building academy) was taking students by the mid-1830s. It is, in any case, evident from Breitinger's later work that he was strongly influenced by several leading Berlin architects of the time including Friedrich August Stüler. Heinrich Strack, Eduard Knoblauch and, particularly, Karl Friedrich Schinkel.

== Career ==
Back in Zurich, Breitinger headed up his own construction business between 1837 and 1845. The Üetliberg Guest house, constructed during 1838 and 1839, dates from this period. This timber construction in what became the "typical Swiss" style was an ambitiously conceived hotel and an early indication of the boom in Alpine tourism that would take off later in the century. (The building itself was torn down and replaced with a more bombastic structure in 1872.) In 1845 he relocated to the Tyrol where he based himself for the next eight years. He set up and ran a mining operation and an associated asphalt factory near Innsbruck. On his return to Switzerland he worked as architect and project manager for new railway stations along a number of new railway lines. Railway construction displayed accelerating momentum in response to the 1852 Railway Law. Breitinger's first major railway-related contract came in 1853 and was with the newly founded Swiss Northeastern Railway, for which he built the station at Romanshorn which opened in 1855. Later in the decade he worked for the competing United Swiss Railways company, responsible for the construction of a series of stations along the lines from the northeast of Switzerland to Chur.

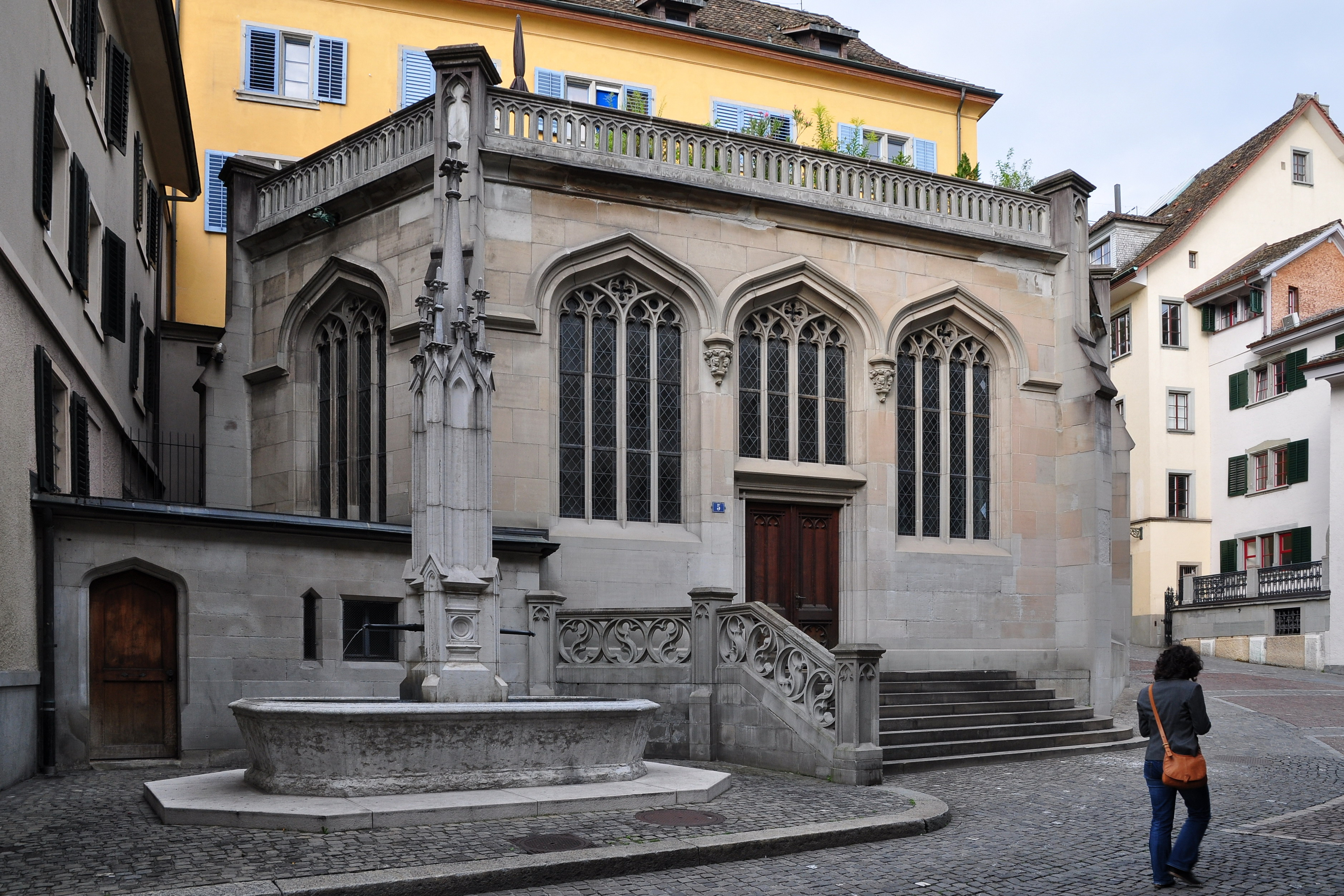

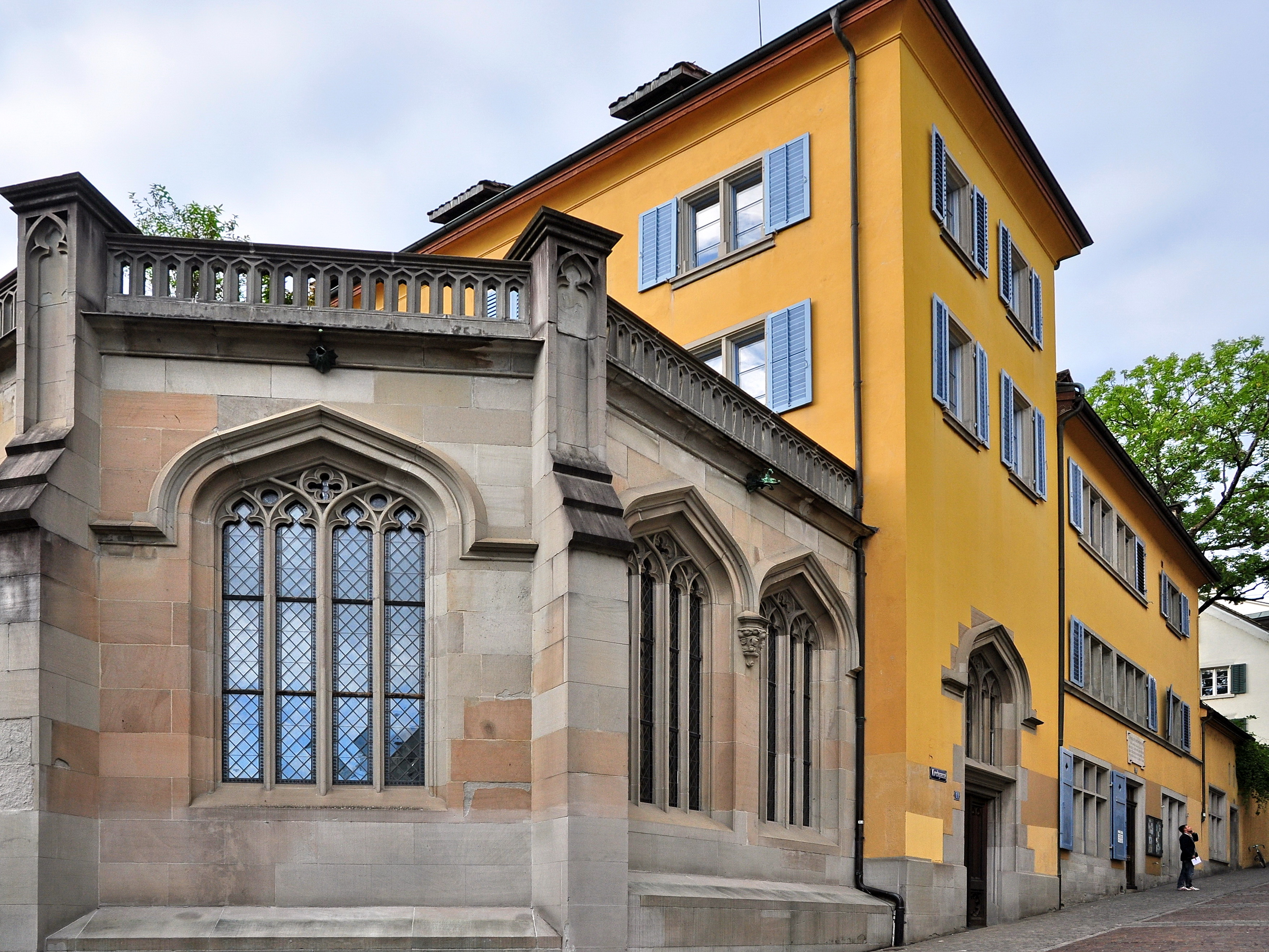
Grossmünsterkapelle, 1858

Breitinger was also highly active in Zürich. He repeatedly submitted proposals for city development, for instance concerning a new development in round the main station (1855) and another for the Kratz quarter alongside the lake (1959). Between 1857 and 1867 he engaged more directly in the political aspects of Zürich's urban development, serving as a "Gemeinderat" (loosely, "local councillor") and as a member of the city's Buildings Commission. Along with Leonhard Zeugheer, Gustav Albert Wegmann and Ferdinand Stadler, Breitinger was part of a new generation of Zürich architects who learned their craft before a structured training programme in Architecture had been created in Switzerland. That deficiency would be remedied by the creation during the 1850s of the "Polytechnikum Academy", followed by the emergence from it of a subsequent generation of architecture students taught and mentored by the formidable Gottfried Semper. Between 1865 and 1867 Breitinger teamed up with these recently trained younger architects to put forward a major development plan for the city of Zürich.

Unfortunately, many of Breitinger's Zürich buildings no longer exist. One that survived in the heart of the city, thanks to a referendum conducted in response to a contentious redevelopment plans in the 1960s, which has more recently been imaginatively and carefully restored, is the "Great Minster Chapel", built between 1858 and 1860, across the Zwingliplatz beyond the Theological Faculty in the former cloisters of the "Great Minster", in the "Old town". The chapel applies a Swiss vision the so-called English Tudor Gothic style, with a large fountain on the west side of the building. Breitinger achieved significant additional interior floor space by using a polygonal floor plan which pushes through, far into the adjacent pre-existing "helper building". Fountain and chapel are both part of a more ambitious (otherwise unrealised) plan that Breitinger had drawn up in 1858 for a renovation of the Medieval "Helferei Quarter".

After the Great Fire, which destroyed two thirds of Glarus in 1861, Breitinger relocated and involved himself in a number of important building projects. His contributions included modern residential developments which he undertook with his pupil Johann Heinrich Reutlinger (1841–1913).

In 1876 he relocated again, this time to Weesen (St. Gallen) where he continued working for the rest of his life, notably on plans for the Protestant church at Siebnen and for the Stachelberg thermal resort (LinthalGL), completed posthumously in 1881.
