= Weinfelden railway station =

Railway station in Switzerland

Weinfelden
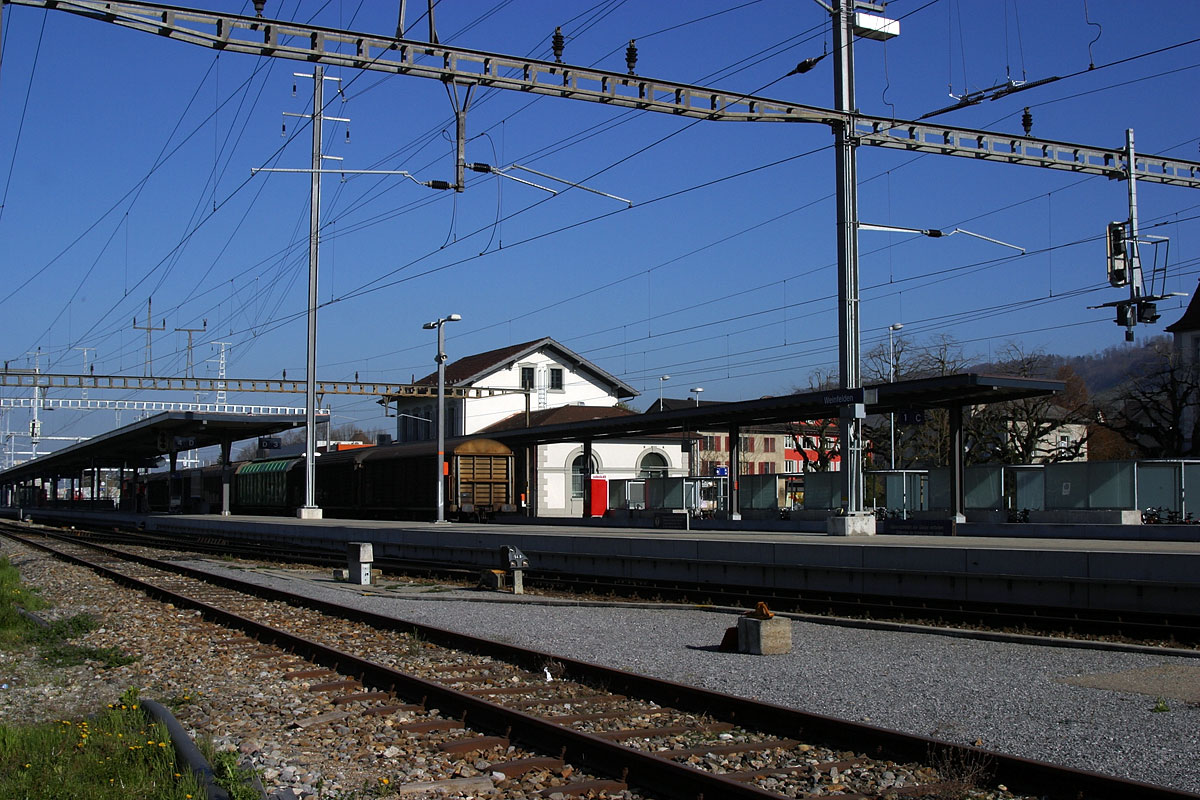

General information
- Location: Bahnhofstrasse; Weinfelden; Switzerland
- Coordinates: 47.566732°N 9.104823°E
- Elevation: 429 m (1,407 ft)
- Owner: Swiss Federal Railways
- Lines: Winterthur–Romanshorn line; Wil–Kreuzlingen line
- Train operators: Swiss Federal Railways; Thurbo
- Connections
- Bus: PostAuto bus routes 722 833 838 921

Other information
- Fare zone: 924 (Tarifverbund Ostwind)

Passengers
- 2025: 16,500 per day (SBB, Thurbo)
- Rank: 50 out of 1,095

Services
Preceding station	SBB CFF FFS	Following station
Frauenfeld towards Brig	IC 8	Amriswil towards Romanshorn
Frauenfeld towards Interlaken Ost	IC 81	Amriswil towards Romanshorn
Frauenfeld towards Lucerne	IR 75	Kreuzlingen towards Konstanz
Preceding station	Zurich S-Bahn	Following station
Frauenfeld towards Zürich HB	S23	Sulgen towards Romanshorn
Märstetten towards Zug	S24	Terminus
Märstetten towards Winterthur	S30	Terminus
Preceding station	St. Gallen S-Bahn	Following station
Terminus	S5	Bürglen towards St. Margrethen
Terminus	S7	Amriswil towards Lindau-Insel
Bussnang towards Wil	S10	Bürglen towards Romanshorn
Terminus	S14	Kehlhof towards Konstanz
Terminus	S44	Kreuzlingen towards Konstanz
Terminus	SN14 Limited service	Kehlhof towards Konstanz
Märstetten towards Winterthur	SN30 Limited service	Bürglen towards Romanshorn
Location
- Location within Switzerland Location within Canton of Thurgau

Weinfelden railway station is a railway station in the Swiss canton of Thurgau and the municipality of Weinfelden. The station is located on the Winterthur–Romanshorn railway line, at its junctions with the Mittelthurgau-Bahn lines to Wil and Konstanz.

Weinfelden station is an intermediate stop on long-distance services from Brig to Romanshorn and Lucerne to Konstanz. It is also the terminus of Zurich S-Bahn services S24 and S30, together with services of the St. Gallen S-Bahn.

The railway station is linked with the Conny-Land animal theme park in Lipperswil via a bus line (833).

== Services ==
=== Rail ===
As of the December 2023 timetable change, the following services stop at Weinfelden:

- InterCity / InterRegio:
  - / /: half-hourly service to Zürich Hauptbahnhof; hourly service to Spiez, Lucerne, Romanshorn, and Konstanz; service every two hours to Brig and Interlaken Ost.
- Zurich S-Bahn
  - S23: peak-hour service between Zürich main station and Romanshorn via Zürich Stadelhofen.
  - S24 / S30: half-hourly service to Winterthur and hourly service to Zug.
- St. Gallen S-Bahn:
  - S5: half-hourly service to Bischofszell Stadt (weekends) or St. Gallen (weekdays) and hourly service to St. Margrethen.
  - S7 / S10: half-hourly service to Romanshorn and hourly service to Rorschach.
  - S14: half-hourly service to Konstanz.
  - S44: service every two hours to Konstanz.

During weekends, the station is served by two nighttime S-Bahn services (SN14, SN30), offered by Ostwind fare network, and operated by Thurbo for St. Gallen S-Bahn.

- St. Gallen S-Bahn:
  - SN14: hourly service to Konstanz via Kreuzlingen.
  - SN30: hourly service to Winterthur and to Romanshorn, via Frauenfeld.

=== Bus ===
The railway station is also served by several bus routes of PostBus Switzerland (PostAuto).

== See also ==
- Bodensee S-Bahn
- Rail transport in Switzerland
