= Thurbo =

Swiss railway company

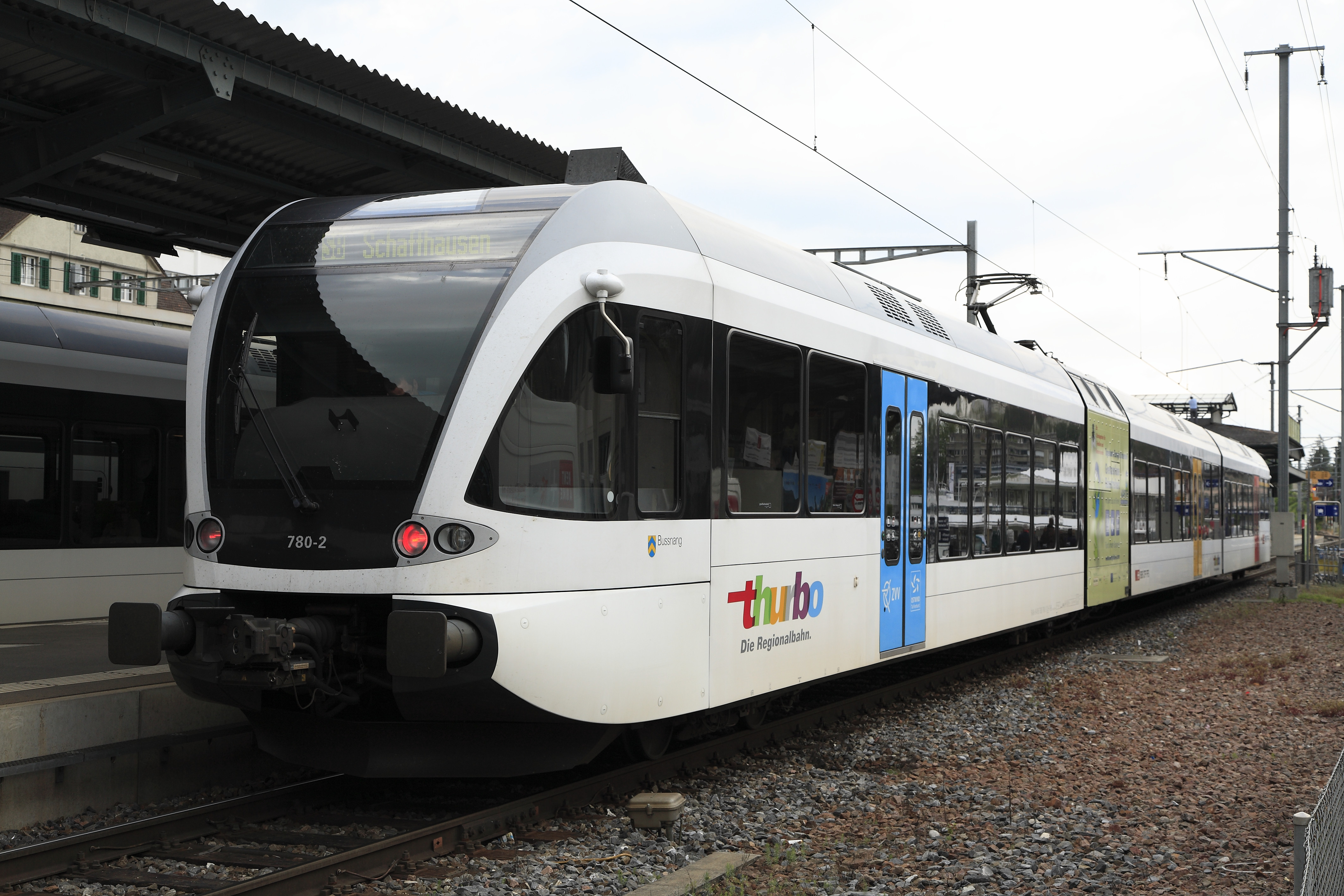
- Thurbo regional at Romanshorn
- Company type: Jointly SBB CFF FFS and cantonal owned AG/SA
- Industry: Rail Transport
- Founded: 20 September 2001; 24 years ago
- Headquarters: Kreuzlingen, Thurgau, Switzerland
- Key people: Claudia Bossert (CEO), Werner Schurter
- Number of employees: 500 (as of 2022)
- Divisions: Passenger
- Website: www.thurbo.ch

Thurbo is a railway company with mostly S-Bahn-style services in Switzerland (cantons of Aargau, Grisons, Schaffhausen, St. Gallen, Thurgau, Zürich), southern Germany (states of Baden-Württemberg, Bavaria), and northwestern Vorarlberg, Austria, jointly owned by Swiss Federal Railways (90%) and the canton of Thurgau.

It operates regional transport on a network of 658 km (409 mi) belonging to SBB CFF FFS, with the exception of the route Wil–Weinfelden–Konstanz, which is only maintained by the latter and except tracks in Austria and Germany. As of 2022, the company owns 110 Stadler GTW EMUs and carries 25.8 million passengers a year. The fleet will be renewed with Stadler Flirt Evo trainsets from 2026 onwards.

The acronym Thurbo (pronounced as Tour-bo in German) is derived from the river Thur (or the canton of Thurgau, respectively) and the first two letters of Bodensee (German name for Lake Constance), probably on the basis of the homophone turbo.

== Description ==
Thurbo was founded in September 2001 by Swiss Federal Railways (SBB CFF FFS) and Mittelthurgau-Bahn (MThB). Its main business is regional passenger traffic. Infrastructure Kreuzlingen - Weinfelden - Wil SG, taken over from Mittelthurgau-Bahn, is operated by Thurbo but maintained by SBB CFF FFS.

Thurbo operates many lines in the Ostwind transit district, including all services of Schaffhausen S-Bahn (since 2013), and most services of St. Gallen S-Bahn. Some lines are part of the Bodensee S-Bahn, which includes transborder services between Switzerland and southern Germany (Baden-Württemberg, Bavaria), some operated by SBB GmbH using EMUs of Thurbo, and Austria (Vorarlberg).

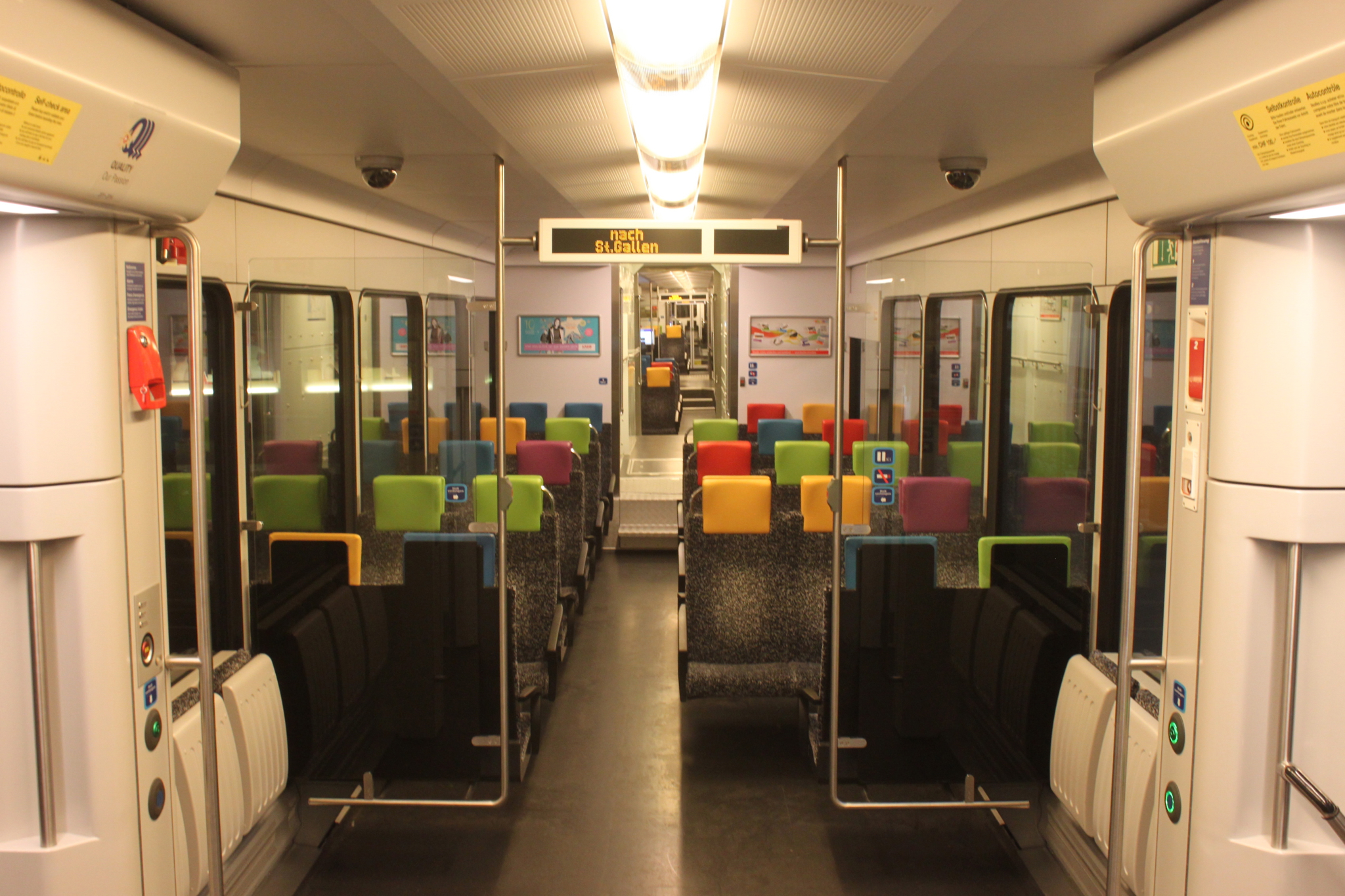
Interior of a Thurbo EMU

Several ZVV lines of Zürich S-Bahn are also operated by Thurbo, for example the S26 service in the canton of Zürich between Winterthur and Rüti ZH, or the S36 between Bülach and Waldshut (Germany). Due to increased demand, some services previously operated by Thurbo are now operated by SBB CFF FFS using either double-deck EMUs (e.g., RABe 511) or Re 450 class locomotives pushing or pulling double-deck passenger carriages.

THURBO also operates a RegioExpress (RE) between Herisau and Konstanz (Germany) nicknamed der Konstanzer by locals.

== Operation ==
Network of Zürich S-Bahn (2018)

The following services are (or were) operated by THURBO.

=== Former Mittelthurgaubahn ===
- Wil SG–Weinfelden–Kreuzlingen (–Konstanz)

=== RegioExpress ===
- RE1 Konstanz–Kreuzlingen Hafen–Romanshorn–St. Gallen–Herisau

=== Schaffhausen S-Bahn ===
- S62: Singen (Hohentwiel)–Thayngen–Schaffhausen (Rhyhas)
- S64: Erzingen (Baden)–Wilchingen-Hallau–Neuhausen Badischer Bahnhof–Schaffhausen
- S65: Jestetten–Neuhausen Rheinfall–Neuhausen–Schaffhausen

=== St. Gallen S-Bahn ===
- S1 Wil SG–St. Gallen–Romanshorn–Kreuzlingen–Stein am Rhein–Diessenhofen–Schaffhausen
- S2 Nesslau-Neu St. Johann–Ebnat-Kappel–Lichtensteig–St. Gallen–Rorschach–St. Margrethen–Altstätten SG
- S5 Weinfelden–Sulgen–Hauptwil–Gossau SG–St. Gallen–St. Margrethen
- S7 Weinfelden–Romanshorn–Arbon–Rorschach (–Bregenz–Lindau-Reutin–Lindau-Insel)
- S9 Wil SG–Bütschwil–Wattwil
- S10 Wil SG–Weinfelden–Amriswil–Romanshorn
- S12 Sargans–Bad Ragaz–Landquart–Chur
- S14 Weinfelden–Kreuzlingen–Konstanz
- S44 Weinfelden–Kreuzlingen–Konstanz (express)
- S82 St. Gallen–St. Gallen St. Fiden–Wittenbach

==== Previous operations ====
- S3 St. Gallen–St. Margrethen (until 2021, merged with the former S5 into the current S5 of St. Gallen S-Bahn)
- S8 Schaffhausen–Romanshorn–St. Gallen (until 2021, merged with the former S1 into the current S1 of St. Gallen S-Bahn)
- S81 Herisau–St. Gallen Haggen–St. Gallen (until December 2024, now operated by SOB)

=== Zürich S-Bahn ===
- S26 Winterthur–Bauma–Rüti ZH
- S29 Winterthur–Stein am Rhein
- S35 Winterthur–Wil SG (operated by SBB CFF FFS during peak hour since 2022)
- S36 Waldshut–Bad Zurzach–Bülach
- S41 Winterthur–Bülach

==== Previous operations ====
- S22 Singen (Hohentwiel)–Schaffhausen–Jestetten–Rafz–Eglisau–Bülach (until 2015, subsumed into S9 and S24 of Zürich S-Bahn, respectively)
- S30 Winterthur–Frauenfeld–Weinfelden (–Romanshorn–Rorschach) (until 2018, now operated by SBB CFF FFS)
- S33 Winterthur–Andelfingen–Schaffhausen (until 2018, now operated by SBB CFF FFS)

== Rolling stock ==
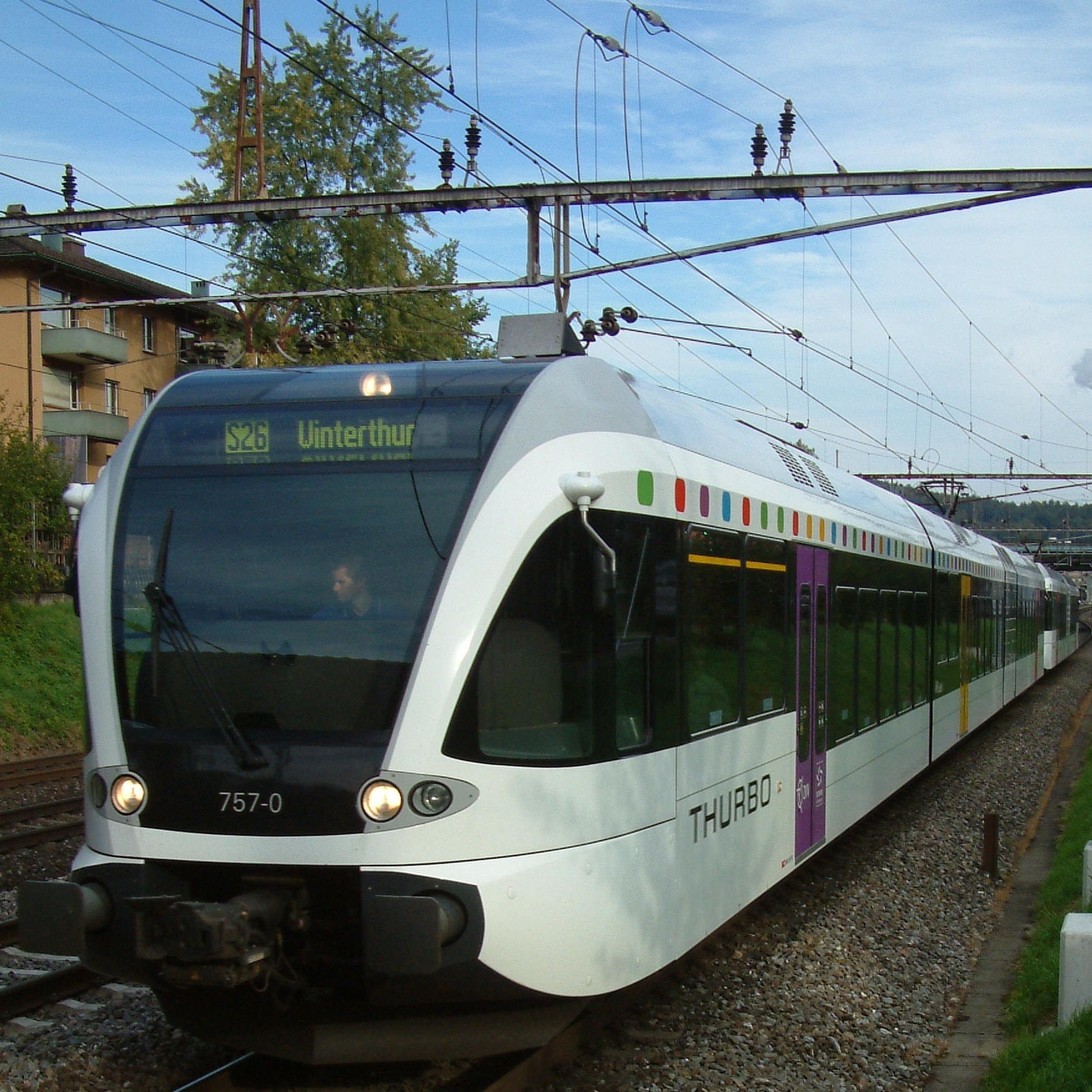
Stadler GTW with former THURBO livery operating as S26 service of Zürich S-Bahn in the Töss Valley

THURBO's fleet consists of

- 41 GTW 2/6 EMUs (RABe 526 701–751)
- 39 GTW 2/8 EMUs (RABe 526 752–790; 781–790 ex 709–718)
- 12 GTW 2/8 EMUs on order (RABe 526 791–802)
- 10 GTW 2/6 EMUs (RABe 526 680–689)

Starting in 2026, the current fleet will be replaced stepwise with Stadler FLIRT Evo trainsets as part of a large order by SBB, Thurbo and RegionAlps.

== See also ==
- Bodensee S-Bahn
- Rail transport in Switzerland
