= Romanshorn railway station =

Railway station in Switzerland

Romanshorn
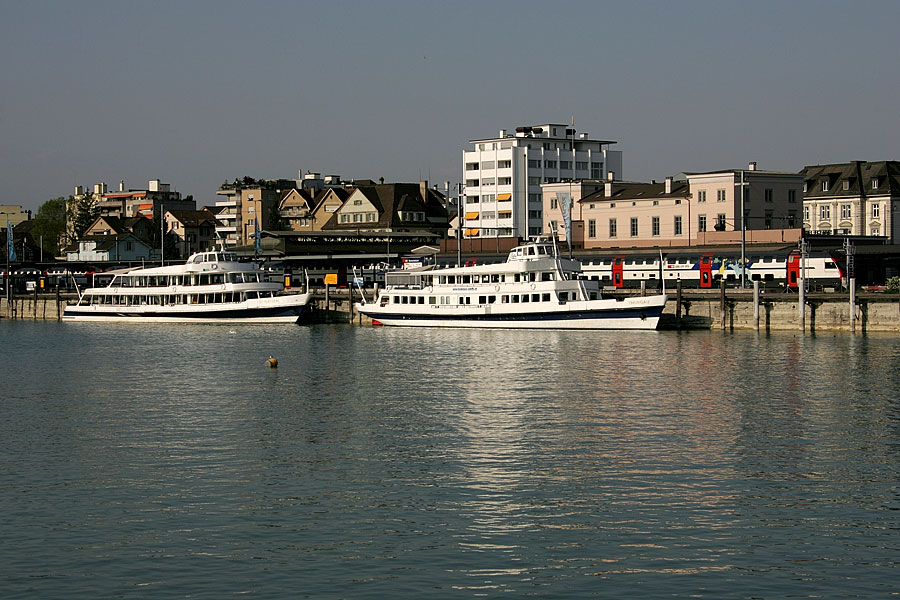
- The station viewed from Lake Constance, 2007.

General information
- Location: Neustrasse; Romanshorn; Switzerland
- Coordinates: 47°33′56″N 9°22′46″E
- Elevation: 399 m (1,309 ft)
- Owner: Swiss Federal Railways
- Lines: Winterthur–Romanshorn line; Lake line; Bodensee–Toggenburg line
- Platforms: 2 island platforms; 1 side platform
- Tracks: 5
- Train operators: Swiss Federal Railways; Thurbo
- Connections
- Ship: Lake Constance ferries

Construction
- Architect: Johann Jakob Breitinger

Other information
- Fare zone: 227 (Tarifverbund Ostschweiz)

History
- Opened: 1855

Passengers
- 2025: 11,800 per day (SBB, Thurbo)
- Rank: 69 out of 1,095

Services
Preceding station	SBB CFF FFS	Following station
Terminus	IC 8	Amriswil towards Brig
Terminus	IC 81	Amriswil towards Interlaken Ost
Preceding station	St. Gallen S-Bahn	Following station
Uttwil towards Schaffhausen	S1	Neukirch-Egnach towards Wil
Reverses direction	S7	Egnach towards Lindau-Insel
Reverses direction	S7	Amriswil towards Weinfelden
Terminus	S10	Amriswil towards Wil
Terminus	SN30 Limited service	Amriswil towards Winterthur
Uttwil towards Kreuzlingen	SN71 Limited service	Terminus
Terminus	SN72 Limited service	Neukirch-Egnach towards Lichtensteig
Preceding station	Thurbo	Following station
Kreuzlingen Hafen towards Konstanz	RE1	St. Gallen towards Herisau
Preceding station	Zurich S-Bahn	Following station
Terminus	S23	Amriswil towards Zürich HB
Location
- Location within Switzerland Location within Canton of Thurgau

Romanshorn railway station (German: Bahnhof Romanshorn) is a railway station that serves the municipality of Romanshorn, in the canton of Thurgau, Switzerland. Opened in 1855, the station is owned and operated by SBB-CFF-FFS. It forms the junction between the Winterthur–Romanshorn railway, the Schaffhausen–Rorschach railway and the Romanshorn–Nesslau Neu St. Johann railway.

The SBB-CFF-FFS and Thurbo operate both long-distance and local traffic to and from the station. These include four St. Gallen S-Bahn lines and an InterCity train to Brig.

== Layout and connections ==
Romanshorn railway station is situated in Neustrasse, at the eastern edge of the city centre. The station has a side platform with one track (No. 1) and two island platforms with two tracks each (Nos. 2–3 and 4–5).

On the other side of the tracks is the Romanshorn ferry terminal, for ferries across Lake Constance.

== Services ==
As of the December 2023 timetable change, the following services stop at Romanshorn:

- InterCity:
  - / hourly service to Spiez; trains continue to Interlaken Ost or Brig.
- RegioExpress:
  - RE1 hourly service between Konstanz and Herisau via St. Gallen.
- St. Gallen S-Bahn (these services also operate for Bodensee S-Bahn):
  - S1: half-hourly service between Schaffhausen and Wil via St. Gallen.
  - S7: hourly service to Weinfelden and half-hourly service to Rorschach. On Saturdays and Sundays, service every two hours from Rorschach to Lindau-Reutin via Bregenz.
  - S10: half-hourly service to Wil via Weinfelden.
- Zurich S-Bahn:
  - S23: peak-hour service between Zürich main station and Romanshorn via Zürich Stadelhofen.

During weekends, the station is served by three nighttime S-Bahn services (SN30, SN71, SN72), offered by Ostwind fare network, and operated by Thurbo for St. Gallen S-Bahn.

- St. Gallen S-Bahn:
  - SN30: hourly service to Winterthur, via Weinfelden and Frauenfeld.
  - SN71: hourly service to Kreuzlingen.
  - SN72: hourly service to Lichtensteig, via St. Gallen.

== History ==
=== Early years ===
After two years of planning, the station was opened in 1855, together with the first stage of the Winterthur–Romanshorn railway, of which it was a terminus. Also in 1855, the station building was erected, according to plans by Johann Jakob Breitinger.

In 1869, the Swiss Northeastern Railway (German: Schweizerische Nordostbahn) put into service the Seelinie between Romanshorn and Rorschach. In the same year, the Lake Constance train ferry was established, for cross-border goods traffic to and from Germany between Romanshorn and Friedrichshafen, and between Lindau and Bregenz.

In 1871, the railway connection with Kreuzlingen Hafen and over the border to Konstanz was handed over to traffic.

On 1 October 1910, the Bodensee-Toggenburg-Bahn opened the line to Nesslau, via St. Gallen and Wattwil.

The train ferry to Lindau and Bregenz was suspended with the outbreak of World War II, and the link with Friedrichshafen was discontinued in 1976, after 107 years of operation.

=== Modernisation 2001–2003 ===
After a major renovation at the beginning of the 20th century, almost no significant modifications were made to the passenger station for nearly 90 years.

Around the turn of the millennium, the signals and points (switches) at the station were still controlled by signal boxes equipped with mechanical lever frames made by the Braunschweig firm of Jüdel in 1912. The southern station throat was spanned by the last signal gantry in Switzerland. Also, the public facilities were outdated, and access to tracks 5 and 6 was via a level crossing, which was secured by the legendary "Chetteli", i.e. chains and a roller shutter. To enable interchange with the ferries, trains to and from Zürich had to be moved during their layovers, make the pathway to the ferry terminal accessible.

The SBB-CFF-FFS therefore decided to make an investment of 50 million francs in the modernization of the station. The contribution to be made by the local community was approved in a referendum with an 86 percent "yes" vote.

The modernisation work began in the summer of 2001, and lasted until the end of November 2003. Track 1, the locomotive shed dating from 1900, various other buildings and the tracks of the former goods depot were all taken out of service. The mechanical signal frames were replaced by a Siemens SIMIS C type electronic system, and therefore the signals and the manually operated barriers were also replaced.

Comfort was also greatly improved in the public areas of the station. The "Chetteli-Übergang" was replaced with a generous pedestrian underpass. New passenger information leaflet displays and screens were installed to replace the lever operated boards dating from 1920. The platforms were raised, and the roofs and speakers were renewed. The two kiosks were replaced by a new building. Thanks to an extension of Platform 2, express trains to Zürich can now use Track 3.

As part of this modernisation work, the Bahnhofplatz was renovated. National publicity for the renovations was ensured by the sculpture of the mythical creature "mocmoc", a creation of the artist duo Com&Com. The local controversy about the sculpture resulted in a 2004 referendum.

=== Developments since 2003 ===
The SBB-CFF-FFS locomotive shed and the signal boxes have been operated since 2003 by the Verein Historische Mittel-Thurgau-Bahn, and since 2005 also by the Stiftung Historisches Bahnhof-Ensemble Romanshorn, as Locorama, a railway world of experience. The historic signal gantry, the coaling stage and the water crane are also part of Locorama.

As part of Rail 2000, an InterCity service, operating to an hourly clock-face timetable using IC2000 trains, was established between Romanshorn and Brig.

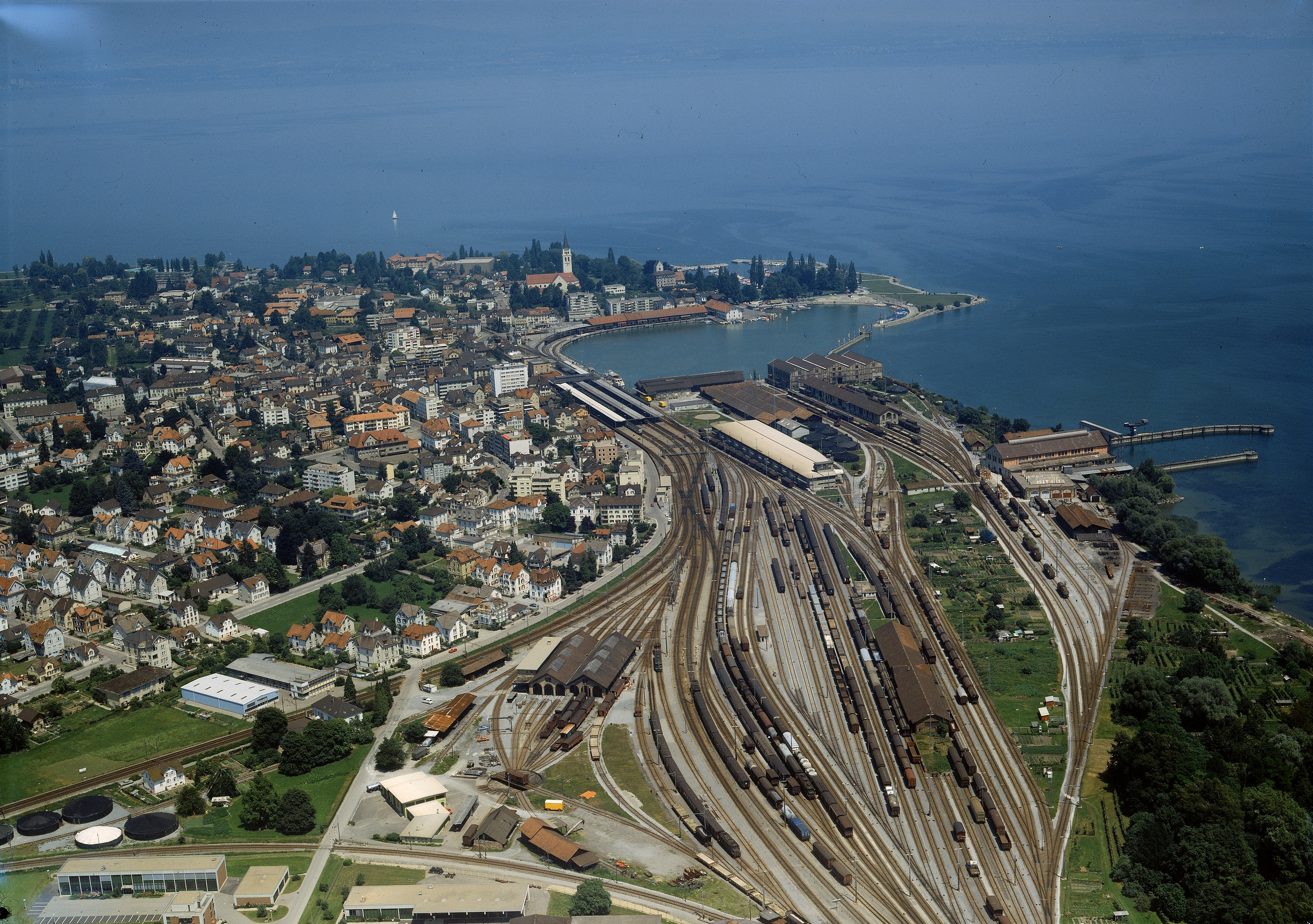
aerial view (1981)

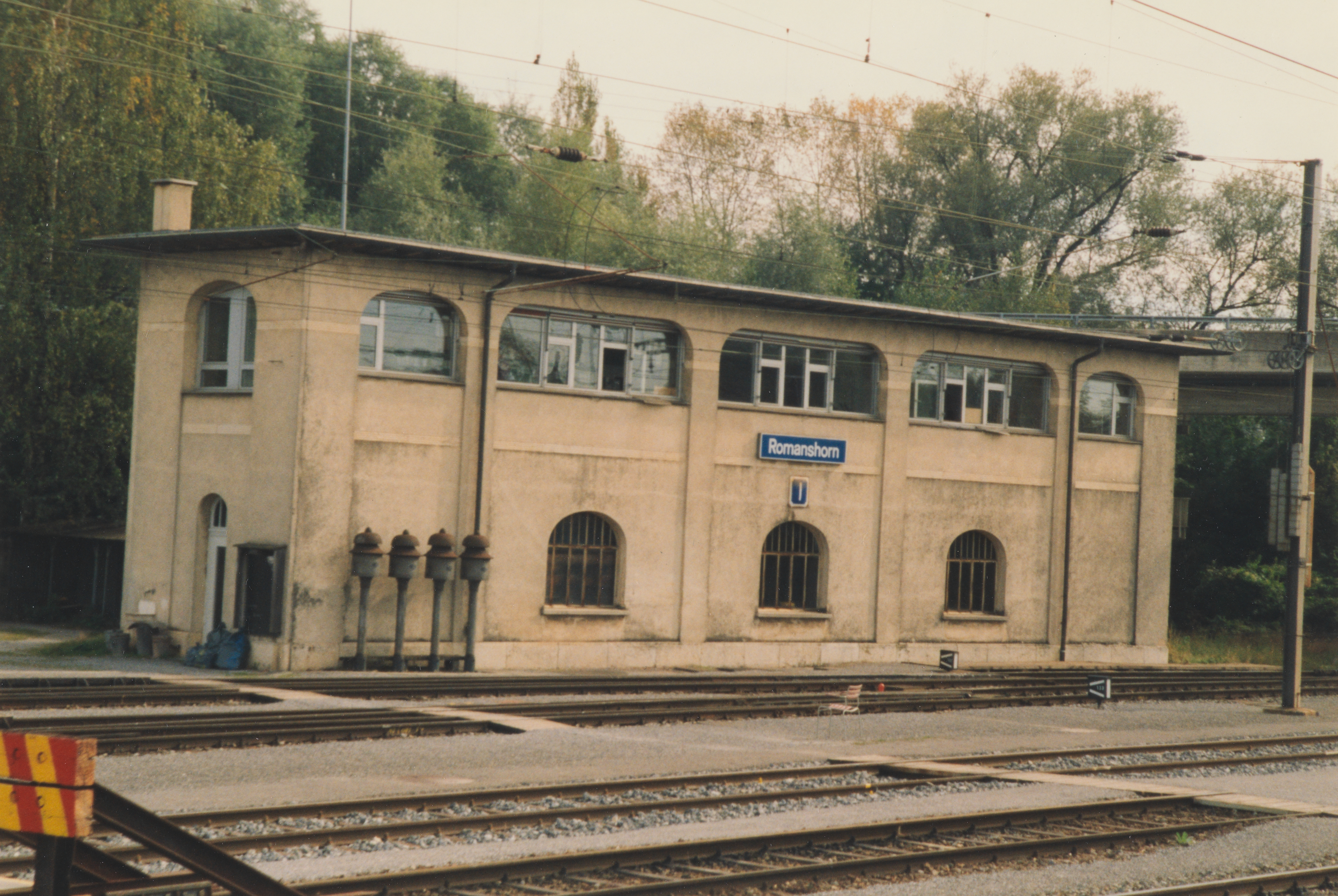
signal box I (1997)

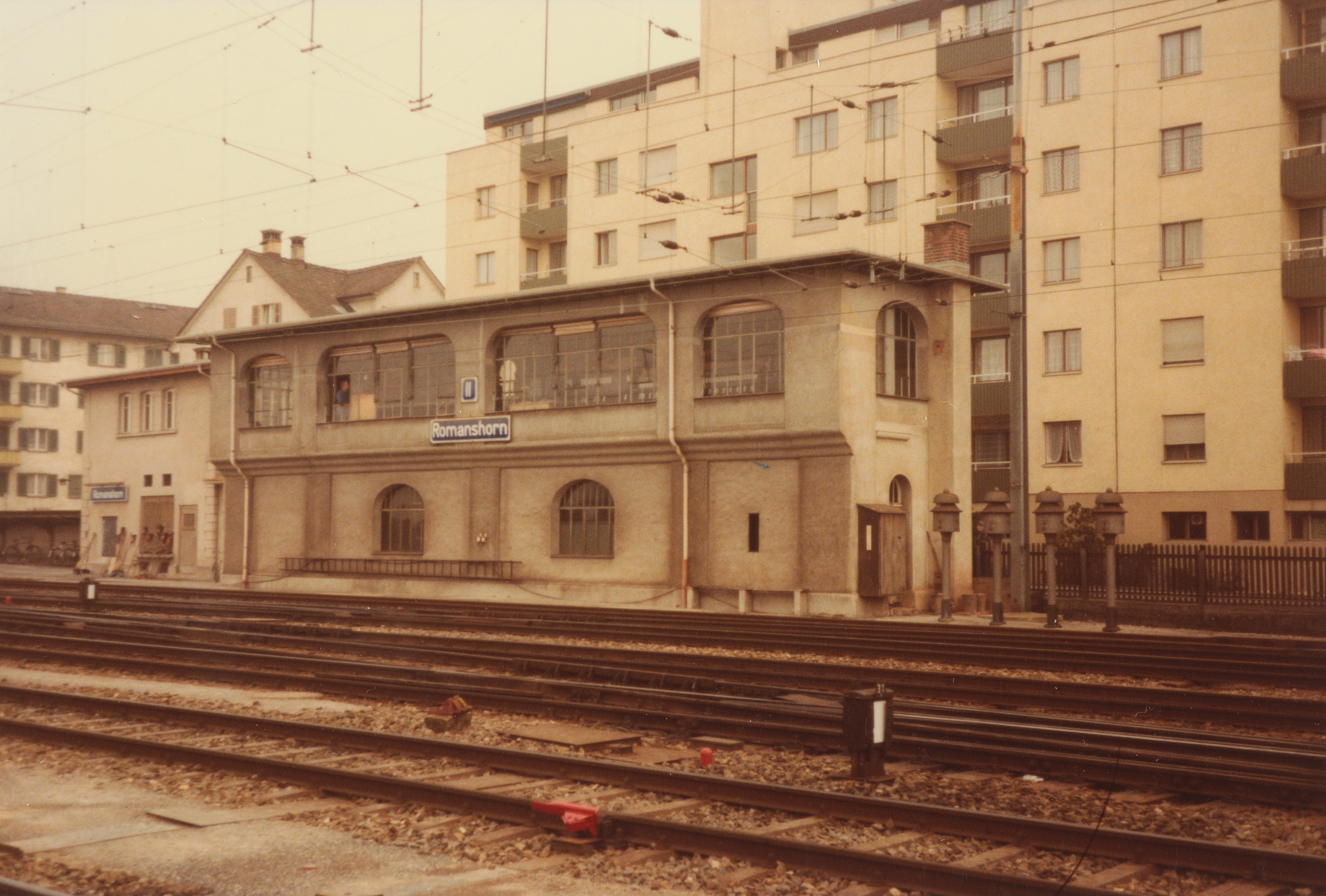
signal box II (ca. 1990)

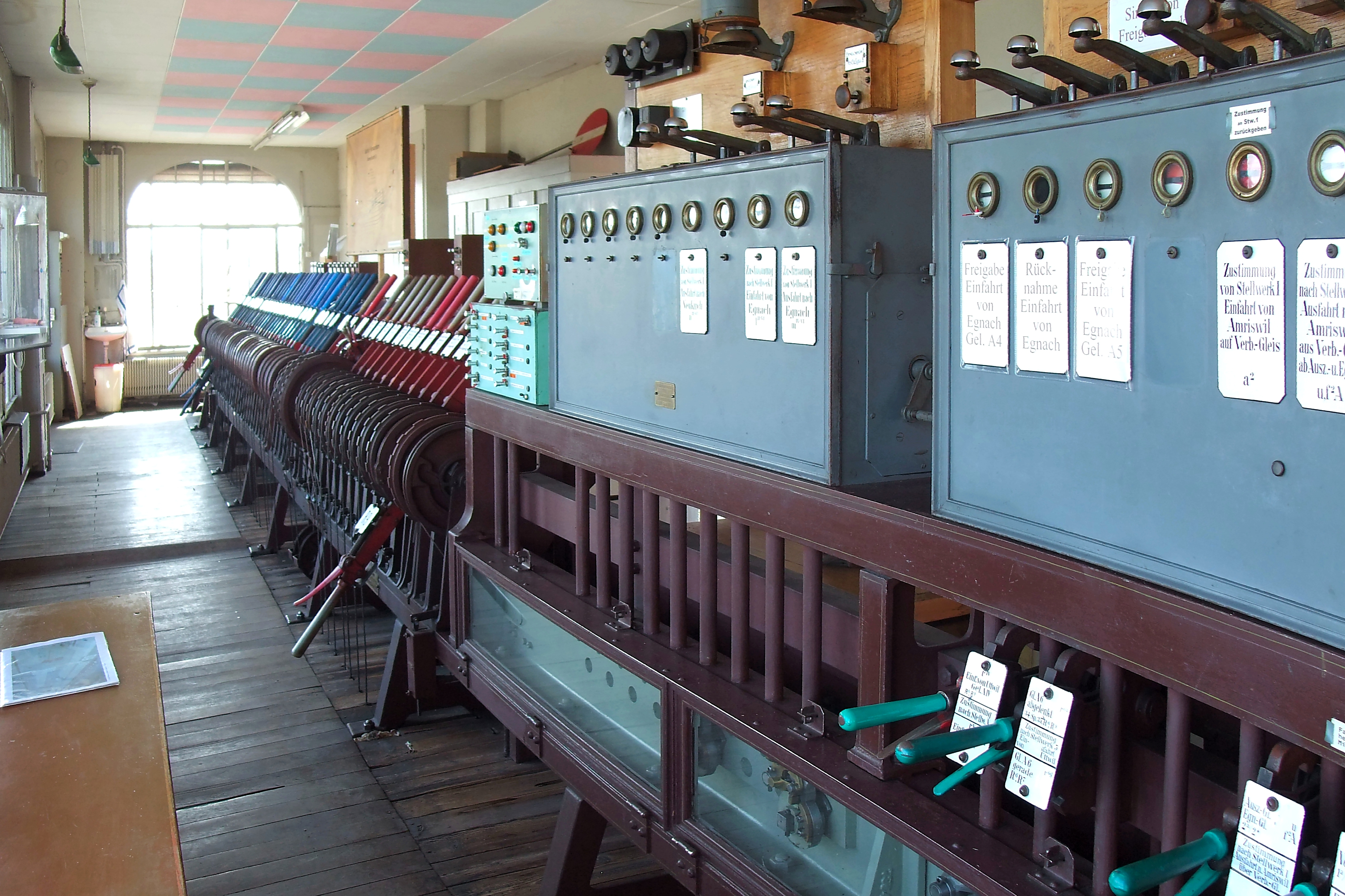
interior of signal box II (2010)

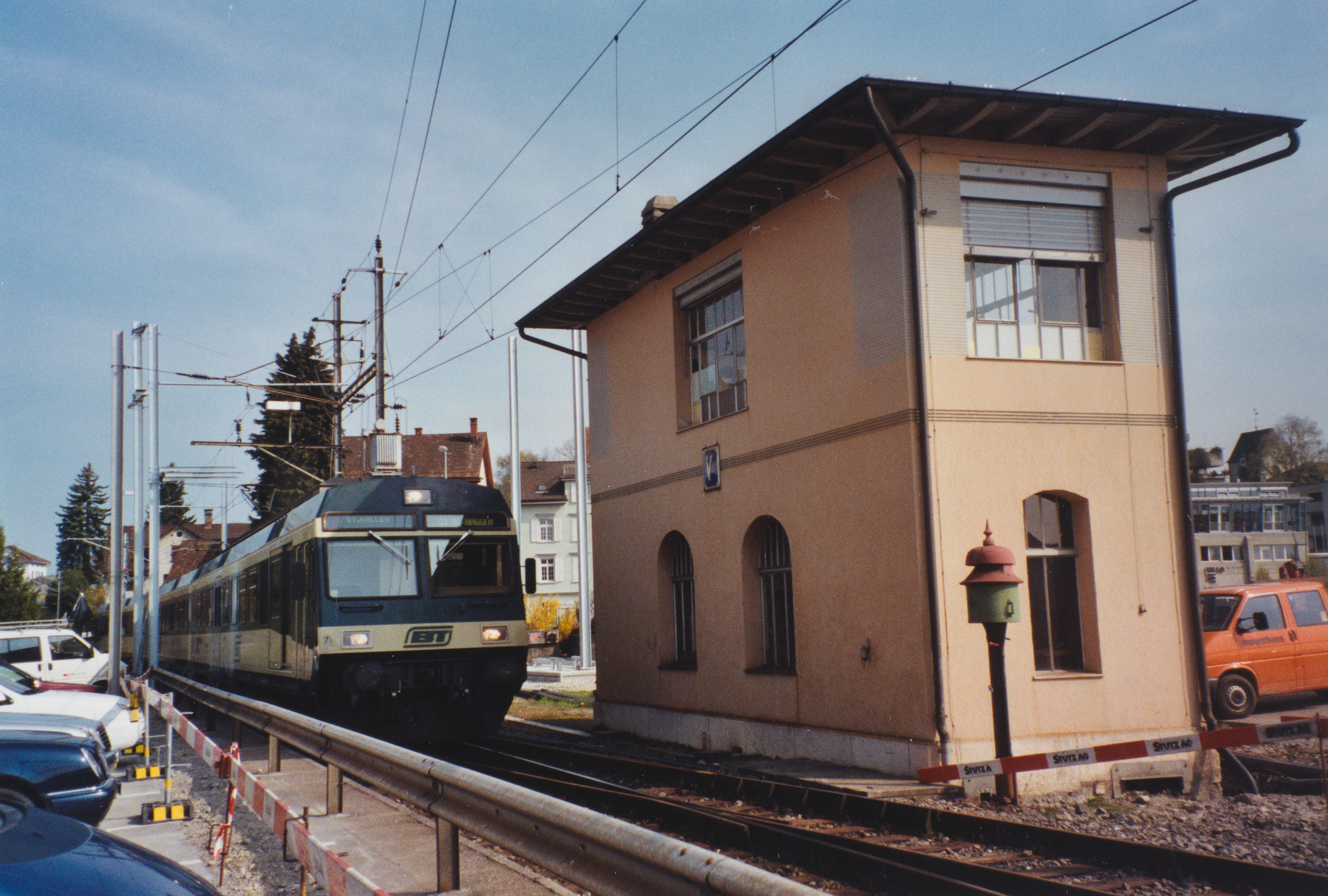
signal box V (2002)

== See also ==
- History of rail transport in Switzerland
- Rail transport in Switzerland
