= Kollbrunn =

Municipality in Zurich, switzerland

Rikon im Tösstal
- Village
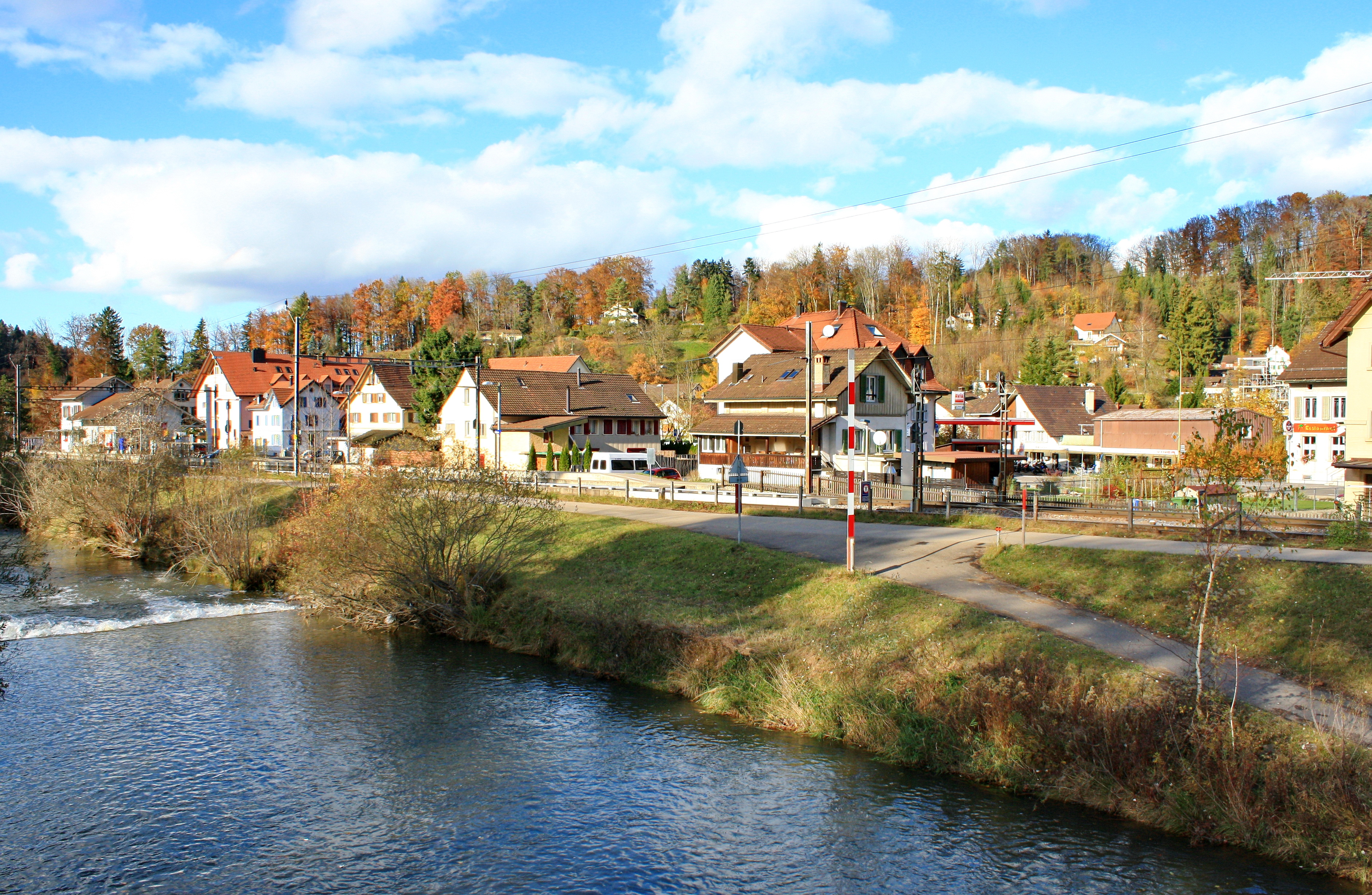
- Rikon and the Töss river (November 2009)
- Interactive map of Rikon im Tösstal
- Coordinates: 47°27.47′N 8°46.48′E
- Country: Switzerland
- Canton: Zürich
- District: Winterthur
- Municipality: Zell, Zurich
- Elevation: 493 m (1,617 ft)

Population (12/2020)
  - Total: 2,971
- Time zone: UTC+1 (CET)
  - Summer (DST): UTC+2 (CEST)
- Postal code: 8483
- Website: www.zell.ch (in German)

Kollbrunn is a village within the municipality of Zell in the canton of Zurich in Switzerland.

== Geography ==
Kollbrunn is located in the district of Winterthur within the Töss Valley. Zell-Kollbrunn belongs to the urban area of the northwestern city of Winterthur. Neighbouring settlements are Kyburg, Rikon im Tösstal, Schlatt, Wildberg and Winterthur.

== Education ==
Education covers Kindergarten and Primarschule (Sekundarschule in Zell and Rikon) levels. Higher school levels are located in Winterthur.

== Transportation ==
The Tösstalstrasse motorway was built in 1837, the Tösstalbahn railway in 1872/76. Kollbrunn railway station is a stop of the S-Bahn Zürich on the lines S11 and S26.

== History ==
Aerial view by Walter Mittelholzer (1920)

Near the church of Zell, the remains of a Roman Empire estate have been found. First mentioned in the years 741 and 744 as «Cella» (Zell), the municipalities Zell and Turbenthal were given to the nunnery on Lützelau island on Lake Zurich by the Alamannic noblewoman Beata. Then after, the area was given to the St. Gallen Abbey, and as a fief to the House of Habsburg, including a watermill in Rikon. As part of the Grafschaft Kyburg the area was sold to the city of Zürich around 1450. In 1817/18 a textile manufacture was established in Rikon, and some years later another one in Kollbrunn.
