= Rämismühle-Zell railway station =

Railway station in Canton of Zürich, Switzerland

Rämismühle-Zell
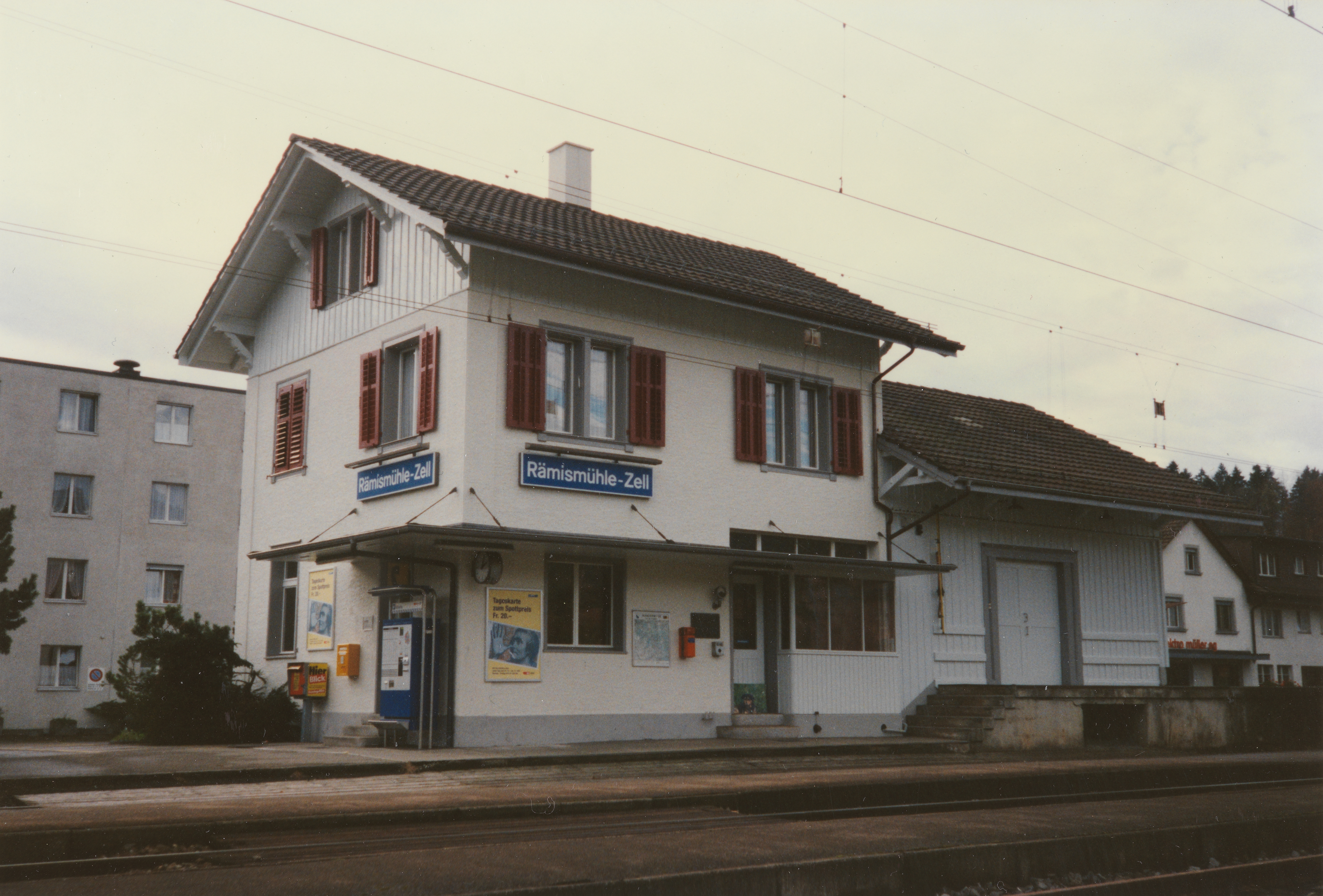
- Station in 1994

General information
- Location: Bahnhofplatz; Zell, Zurich; Switzerland
- Coordinates: 47.44155°N 8.818915°E
- Elevation: 530 m (1,740 ft)
- Owner: Swiss Federal Railways
- Operator: Swiss Federal Railways; Thurbo
- Line: Tösstalbahn
- Platforms: 1 side platform
- Tracks: 1

Other information
- Fare zone: 170 (ZVV)

Services
Preceding station	Zurich S-Bahn	Following station
Rikon towards Aarau	S11	Turbenthal towards Wila
Rikon towards Winterthur	S26	Turbenthal towards Rüti ZH
Location
- Location within Switzerland Location within Canton of Zurich

Rämismühle-Zell railway station is a railway station in the Swiss canton of Zurich. The station is situated in the municipality of Zell. It is located on the Töss Valley railway line (Tösstalbahn) between Winterthur and Rüti ZH, within fare zone 170 of the Zürcher Verkehrsverbund (ZVV).

== Services ==
The station and is served by Zurich S-Bahn lines S11 (peak-hour only, since December 2020) and S26.

- Zurich S-Bahn
  - S11: hourly service (peak-hour only) between Wila and Aarau, via Zürich HB
  - S26: half-hourly service between Winterthur and Rüti ZH

== See also ==
- Rail transport in Switzerland
