= Zell, Zürich =

Zell
- Municipality
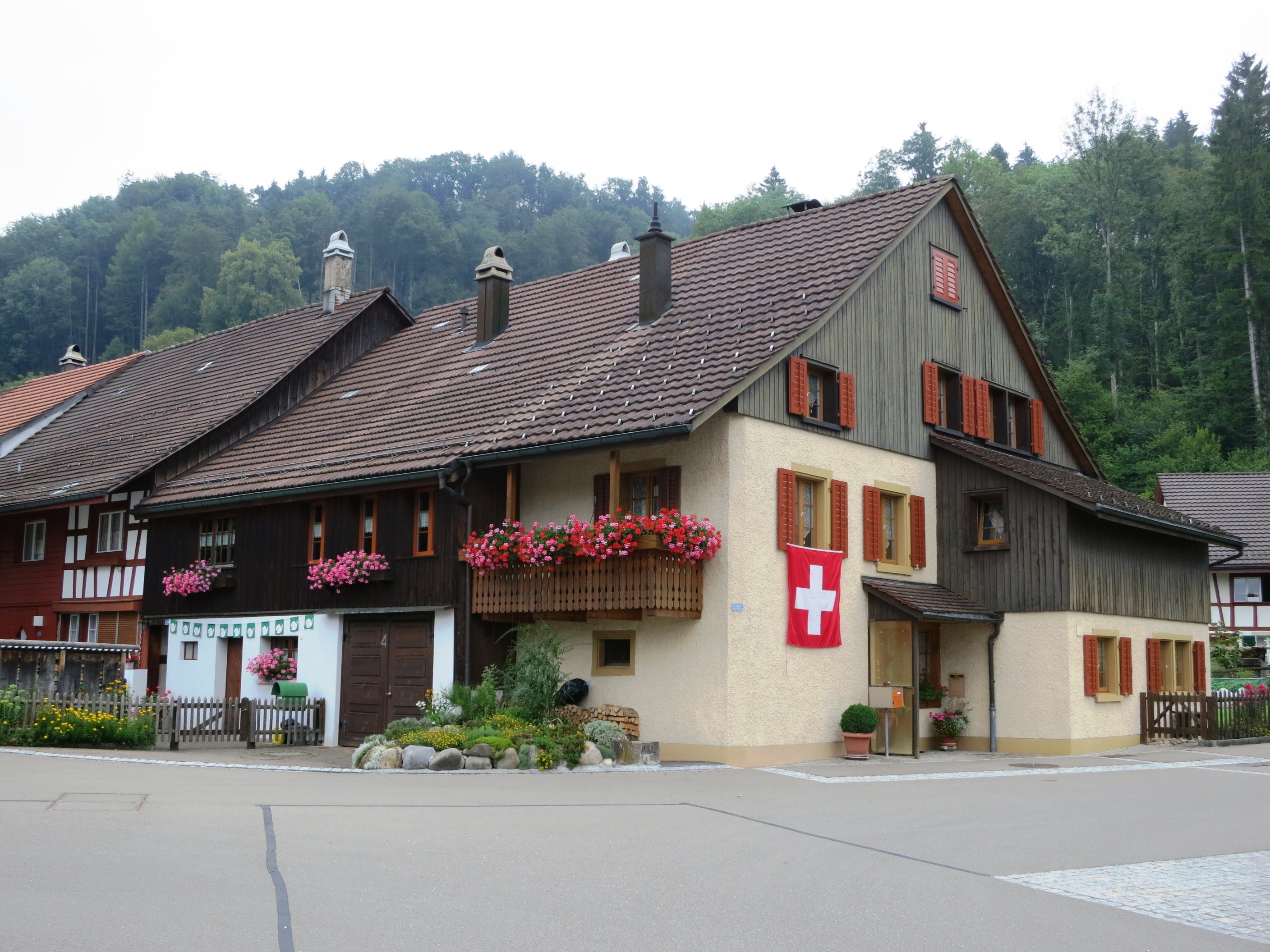

- Flag Coat of arms
- Location of Zell
- Location within Switzerland Location within Canton of Zürich
- Coordinates: 47°27′N 8°49′E
- Country: Switzerland
- Canton: Zürich
- District: Winterthur

Area
  - Total: 12.70 km^{2} (4.90 sq mi)
- Elevation: 541 m (1,775 ft)

Population (December 2020)
  - Total: 6,430
  - Density: 506/km^{2} (1,310/sq mi)
- Time zone: UTC+01:00 (CET)
  - Summer (DST): UTC+02:00 (CEST)
- Postal code: 8487
- SFOS number: 231
- ISO 3166 code: CH-ZH
- Localities: Garten, Kollbrunn, Lettenberg, Rämismühle, Rikon, Schooren, Zell
- Surrounded by: Kyburg, Schlatt, Turbenthal, Weisslingen, Wildberg, Winterthur
- Website: www.zell.ch

Zell (German pronunciation: [tsɛl]) is a municipality in the district of Winterthur in the canton of Zürich in Switzerland.

== Geography ==
Aerial view (1957)

Zell has an area of 13 km^{2} (5.0 sq mi). Of this area, 43.1% is used for agricultural purposes, while 42.1% is forested. Of the rest of the land, 12.5% is settled (buildings or roads) and the remainder (2.3%) is non-productive (rivers, glaciers or mountains). In 1996 housing and buildings made up 9.1% of the total area, while transportation infrastructure made up the rest (3.8%). Of the total unproductive area, water (streams and lakes) made up 1.7% of the area. As of 2007, 12.2% of the total municipal area was undergoing some type of construction.

Zell is situated in the upper Töss Valley. In Zell-Rikon is a Tibetan monastery, the Tibet Institute Rikon. The municipality also includes the hamlet of Kollbrunn.

== Demographics ==
Zell has a population (as of 31 December 2020) of 6,430. As of 2007, 17.6% of the population was made up of foreign nationals. As of 2008 the gender distribution of the population was 50.3% male and 49.7% female. Over the last 10 years the population has grown at a rate of 14.5%. Most of the population (as of 2000) speaks German (87.6%), with Italian being second most common ( 2.8%) and Albanian being third ( 1.8%).

In the 2007 election the most popular party was the SVP which received 40.5% of the vote. The next three most popular parties were the SPS (17%), the CSP (14.1%) and the Green Party (8.3%).

The age distribution of the population (as of 2000) is children and teenagers (0–19 years old) make up 23.4% of the population, while adults (20–64 years old) make up 59.2% and seniors (over 64 years old) make up 17.3%. In Zell about 70% of the population (between age 25–64) have completed either non-mandatory upper secondary education or additional higher education (either university or a Fachhochschule). There are 1874 households in Zell.

Zell has an unemployment rate of 3.02%. As of 2005, there were 134 people employed in the primary economic sector and about 35 businesses involved in this sector. 397 people are employed in the secondary sector and there are 47 businesses in this sector. 680 people are employed in the tertiary sector, with 141 businesses in this sector. As of 2007 52.3% of the working population were employed full-time, and 47.7% were employed part-time.

As of 2008 there were 1138 Catholics and 2306 Protestants in Zell. In the 2000 census, religion was broken down into several smaller categories. From the census, 54.3% were some type of Protestant, with 49.3% belonging to the Swiss Reformed Church and 5% belonging to other Protestant churches. 22.3% of the population were Catholic. Of the rest of the population, 0% were Muslim, 6.5% belonged to another religion (not listed), 3.1% did not give a religion, and 9.6% were atheist or agnostic.

== Transportation ==
Zell lies on the Tösstalbahn railway that links Winterthur and Rüti ZH, and the stations of Rämismühle-Zell, Rikon and Kollbrunn are all within the municipality. All three stations are served by lines S11 and S26 of the Zürich S-Bahn.
