= Kollbrunn railway station =

Railway station in Zürich, Switzerland

Kollbrunn
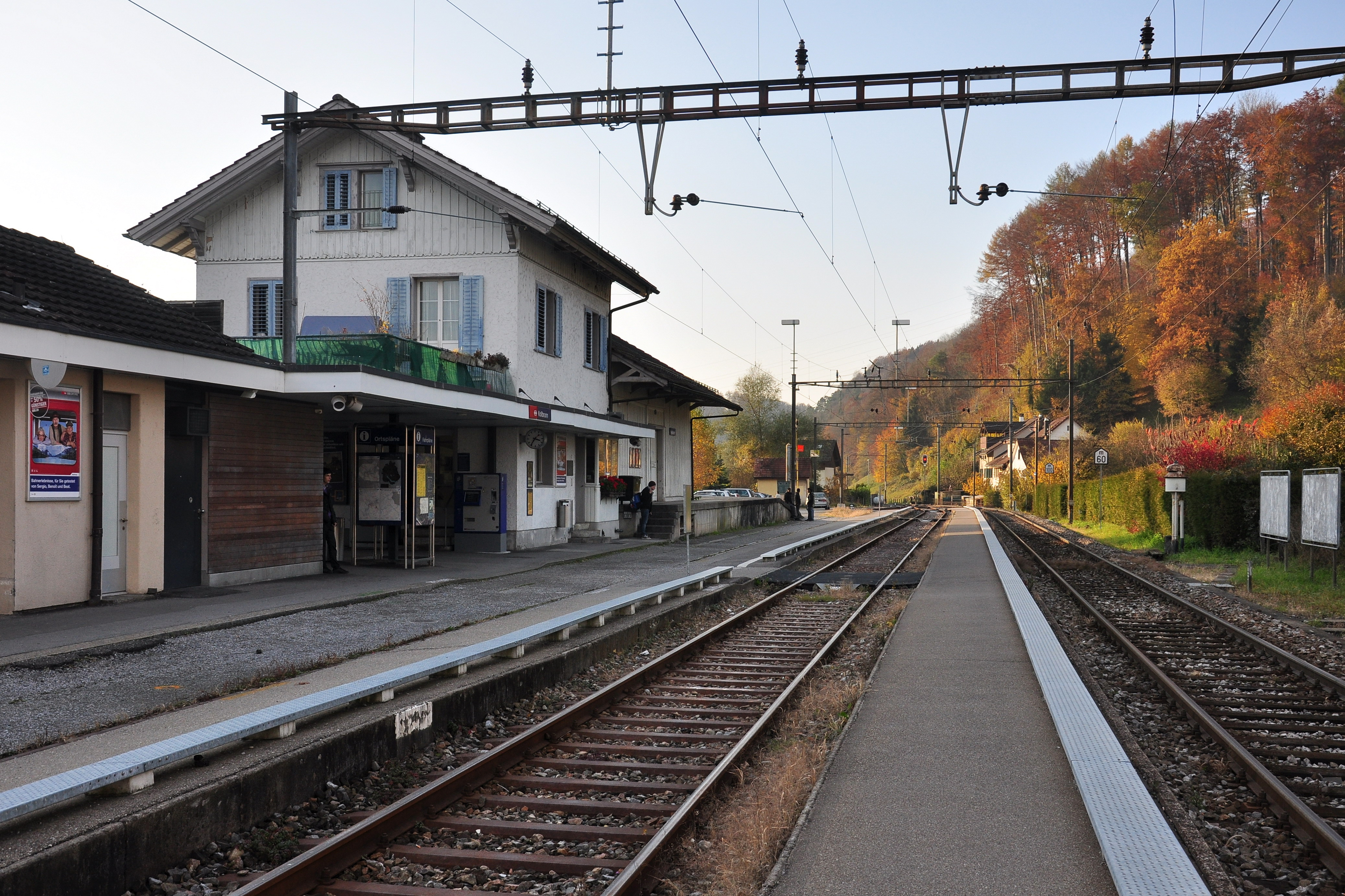

General information
- Location: Untere Bahnhofstrasse, Kollbrunn, Zell, Canton of Zurich, Switzerland
- Coordinates: 47.45807°N 8.773012°E
- Elevation: 493 m (1,617 ft)
- Owner: Swiss Federal Railways
- Operator: Swiss Federal Railways; Thurbo
- Line: Tösstalbahn
- Platforms: 1 side platform
- Tracks: 1
- Connections
- Bus: PostAuto bus route 832

Other information
- Fare zone: 170 (ZVV)

Services
Preceding station	Zurich S-Bahn	Following station
Sennhof-Kyburg towards Aarau	S11	Rikon towards Wila
Sennhof-Kyburg towards Winterthur	S26	Rikon towards Rüti ZH
Location
- Location within Switzerland Location within Canton of Zurich

Kollbrunn railway station is a railway station in the Swiss canton of Zürich. The station is situated in the village of Kollbrunn within the municipality of Zell (Töss Valley). It is located on the Töss Valley railway line (Tösstalbahn) between Winterthur and Rüti ZH, within fare zone 170 of the Zürcher Verkehrsverbund (ZVV).

== Services ==
The station is served by Zurich S-Bahn lines S11 (peak-hour only) and S26.

- Zurich S-Bahn
  - S11: hourly service (peak-hour only) between Wila and Aarau, via Zürich HB
  - S26: half-hourly service between Winterthur and Rüti ZH

== See also ==
- Rail transport in Switzerland
