= Christoph Mörgeli =

Swiss medical historian, journalist and politician

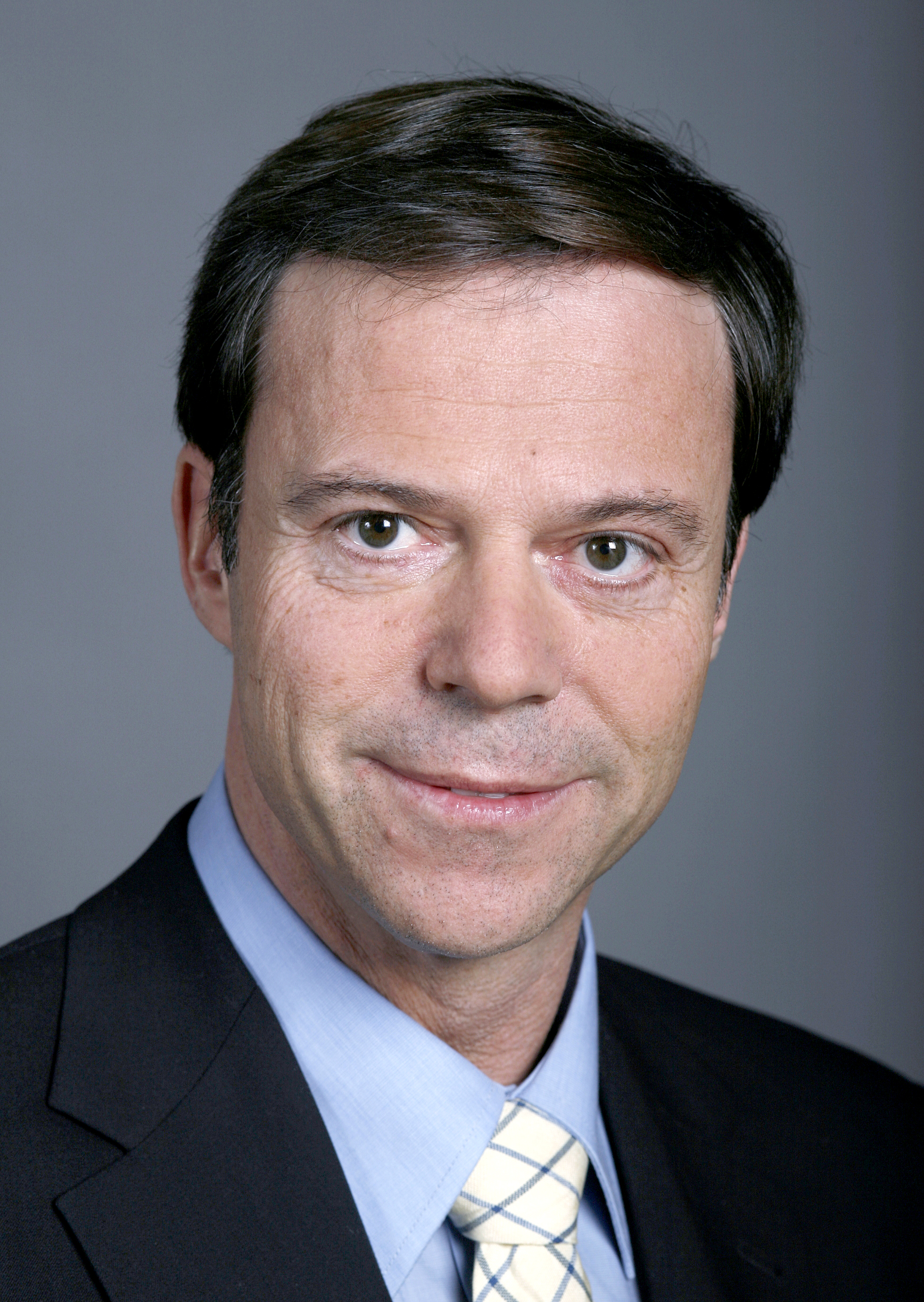
- Mörgeli in 2007

Member of the National Council
- In office 6 December 1999 – 29 November 2015
- Constituency: Canton of Zürich

Personal details
- Born: Christoph Mörgeli; 16 July 1960 (age 66) Stäfa, Zürich, Switzerland
- Party: Swiss People's Party
- Spouse: Yvonne Jenny (m. 1997; div. 2007)
- Domestic partner: Andrea Giger
- Children: 2
- Education: University of Zürich (Licentiate); University of Zürich (Doctorate)
- Occupation: Medical historian, journalist and politician

Military service
- Allegiance: Switzerland
- Branch/service: Swiss Armed Forces
- Rank: Lieutenant Colonel

Christoph Mörgeli (/mɒɡɛlj/ born 16 July 1960) is a Swiss medical historian, journalist and former politician. He served as a member of the National Council (Switzerland) from 1999 to 2015 for the Swiss People's Party. He previously also served as a member of the Cantonal Council of Zürich between 1997 and 1999. Mörgeli announced to run for office again in the 2019 Swiss federal election but was not elected again.

== Early life and education ==
Mörgeli was born 16 July 1960 in Stäfa, Switzerland, a small municipality on Lake Zürich, the second of three children, to Adolf Mörgeli and Marta Mörgeli (née Koller; 1932–2021). He has one brother and a sister. His parents were teachers at the local school in Stäfa. His nephew, Rafael Mörgeli, is a member of the Social Democratic Party of Switzerland and was elected as a member of the Cantonal Council of Zürich for the Meilen constituency in 2022.

His paternal family hailed from Schlatt (presently Schlatt bei Winterthur) where they have been settled in the hamlet of Nussberg since 1548. They were primarily farmers and tradespeople.

He attended the Cantonal School of Wetzikon where he graduated with his Matura Typus A in 1979. Mörgeli then studied history, Political Science and German Literature and Linguistics at University of Zürich graduating in 1985 with a Licentiate (equivalent to a Master's degree). In 1986, he completed his Doctorate under professor Peter Stadler, on a thesis about Johannes Hegetschweiler.

== Career ==
Subsequently, after his graduation he worked as permanent scientific assistant at the Medical History Institute of the University of Zürich, as well as curator of the Museum for Medical History. He remained with the Institute and Museum of Medical History until his dismissal after 'Causa Mörgeli', when it became public that he let his students copy theses for their Doctorate studies. His main research was about the history of the danse macabre.

Since 2016, he engages in self-employed activities as historian, with his company Research Mörgeli GmbH, primarily in the field of medical historical research.

== Politics ==
In 1986, Mörgeli started his political career as a member of the church commission of Stäfa. He was elected into Cantonal Council of Zürich for the Swiss People's Party in 1997 and remained a member until 1999. In the 1999 Swiss federal election, Mörgeli was elected in the National Council (Switzerland). He was not re-elected in the 2015 Swiss federal election and resigned from public office.

== Personal life ==
Mörgeli was married to Yvonne Jenny, with whom he has two children; Maurice (b. 1998) and Michelle (b. 2000). Since 2014, he has been in a relationship with Andrea Giger (b. c. 1985).

He is a member of the Guild zur Schmiden (Zunft zur Schmiden), a well-established guild of the city of Zurich. Mörgeli resides in Stäfa.

== Awards ==
- Conrad Ferdinand Meyer Prize, 1996
- Columnist of the Year (Schweizer Journalist in 2007)
- Arosa Humorschaufel, Arosa Humor Festival, 2012 (nominated)
