= Schlieren railway station =

Railway station in Switzerland

Schlieren
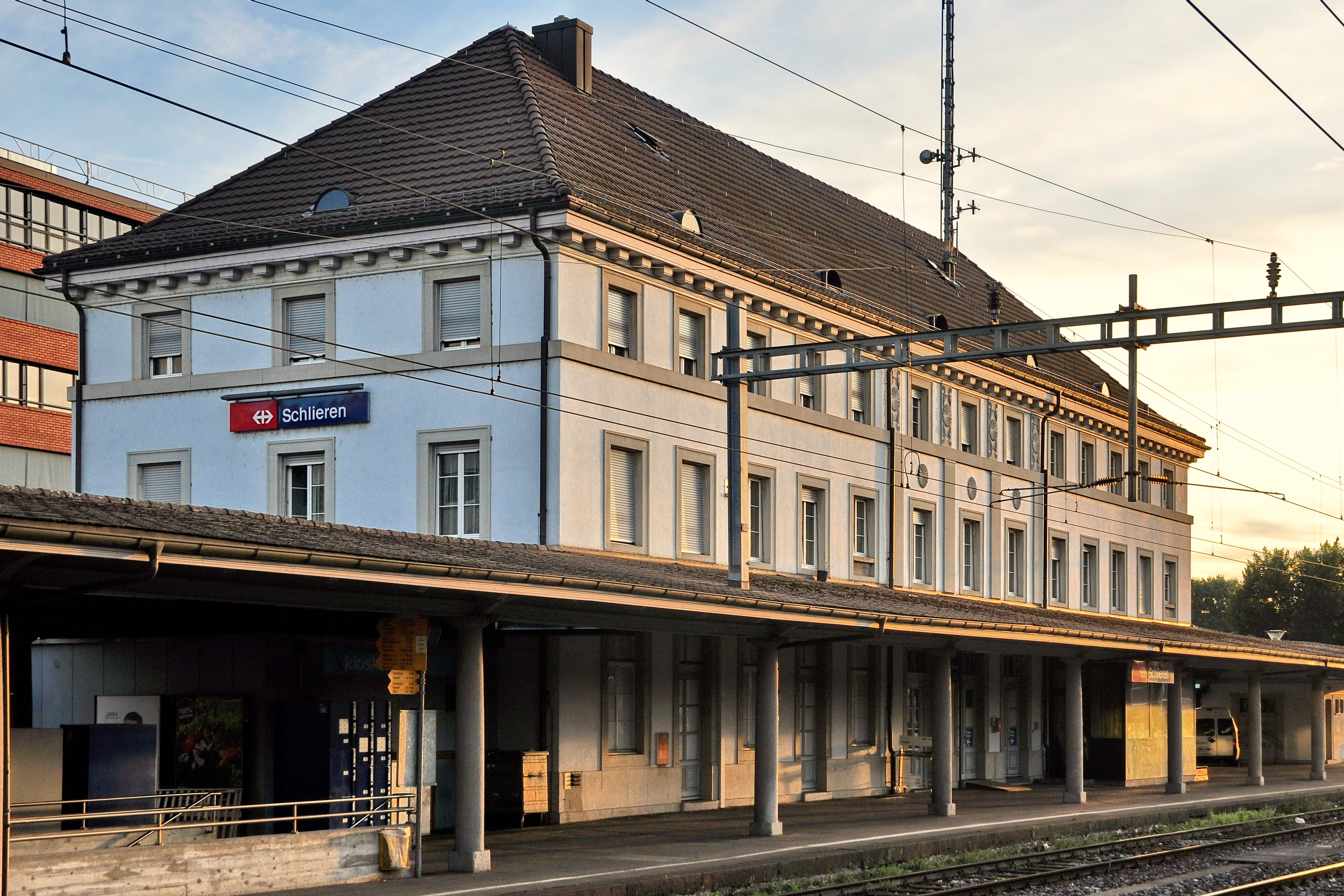
- The station in 2011

General information
- Location: Bahnhofstrasse; Schlieren, Canton of Zurich; Switzerland
- Coordinates: 47°23′55″N 8°26′52″E
- Elevation: 393 m (1,289 ft)
- Owner: Swiss Federal Railways (since 1902); Schweizerische Nordostbahn (1853–1902); Schweizerische Nordbahn (1847–1853)
- Line: Zurich–Baden railway line
- Distance: 7.5 km (4.7 mi) from Zürich HB
- Platforms: 2 island platforms, 1 side platform
- Tracks: 7
- Train operators: Swiss Federal Railways
- Connections: ZVV
- Tram: VBZ tram line 2; AVA tram line 20
- Bus: VBZ bus lines 302 307 317

Other information
- Fare zone: 154 (ZVV)

History
- Opened: 1847

Passengers
- 2025: 12,800 per day (SBB)
- Rank: 63 out of 1,095

Services
Preceding station	Zurich S-Bahn	Following station
Glanzenberg towards Aarau	S11	Zürich Altstetten towards Seuzach or Wila
Glanzenberg towards Brugg AG	S12	Zürich Altstetten towards Schaffhausen or Wil
Glanzenberg towards Aarau	SN1 Limited service	Zürich Altstetten towards Winterthur
Glanzenberg towards Olten	SN11 Limited service	Zürich Altstetten towards Winterthur
Location
- Location within Switzerland Location within Canton of Zürich

Schlieren railway station (German: Bahnhof Schlieren) is a railway station in the Swiss canton of Zurich, situated in the municipality of Schlieren. The station is located on the Zurich–Baden railway line, within fare zone 154 of ZVV.

The former Schlieren carriage works of the Schweizerische Wagons- und Aufzügefabrik AG Schlieren-Zürich were once situated adjacent to the station. The works closed in 1985, and the site is now partially occupied by a printing works for the Neue Zürcher Zeitung.

== Services ==
=== S-Bahn ===
Schlieren is a stop of two Zurich S-Bahn lines: the S11, which operates between Aarau and Seuzach/Wila, and the S12, which runs between Brugg and Schaffhausen/Wil, both via Zurich and Winterthur. As of the December 2023 timetable change, the following services stop at Schlieren:

- Zurich S-Bahn:
  - S11: half-hourly service between Aarau and Winterthur; hourly service to Seuzach or Sennhof-Kyburg; rush-hour service to Wila.
  - S12: half-hourly service between Brugg AG and Winterthur; hourly service to Schaffhausen or Wil.

During weekends, there are also two nighttime S-Bahn services (SN1, SN11) calling at the station, offered by ZVV:

- SN1: on Friday and Saturday night, hourly service between Aarau and Winterthur via Zürich Stadelhofen.
- SN11: on Friday and Saturday night, hourly service between Winterthur and Olten.

=== Tram and bus ===
The Limmattalbahn (operated by Aargau Verkehr AG, AVA) and Verkehrsbetriebe Zürich (VBZ) trams and buses depart from the nearby tram and bus stop "Schlieren Zentrum/Bahnhof".

== Gallery ==
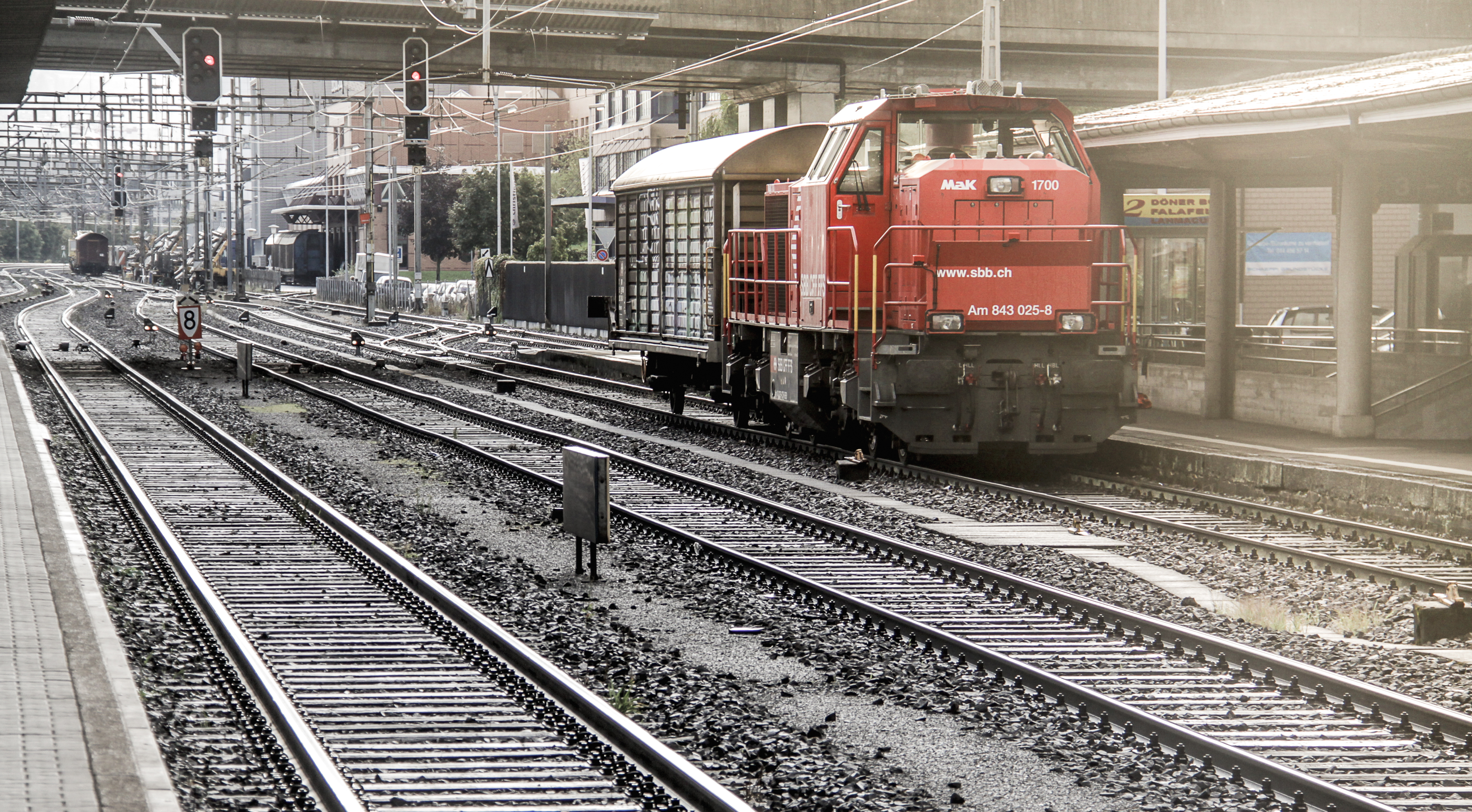
Schlieren train station

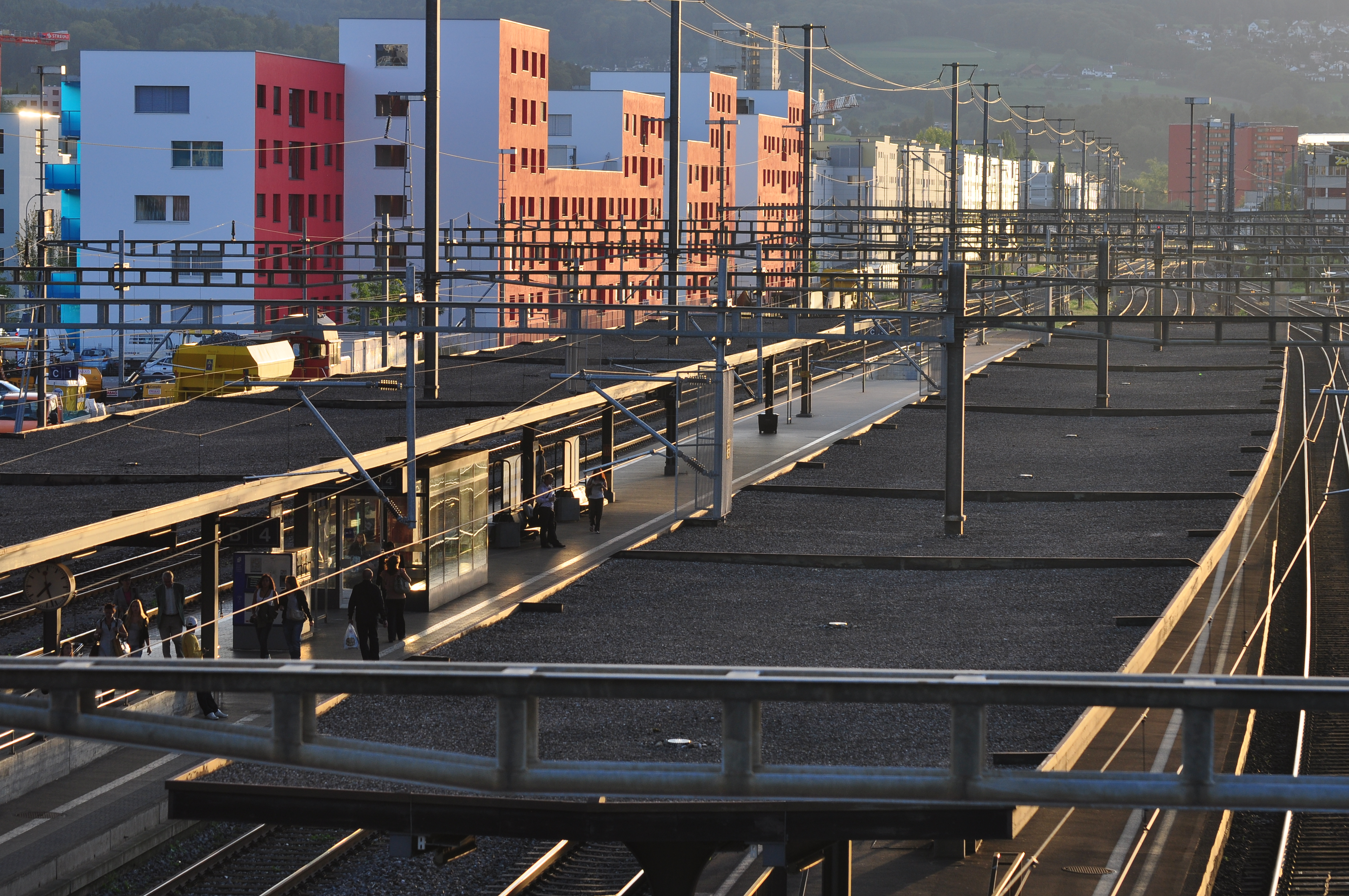
Station platforms

== See also ==
- Rail transport in Switzerland
