= Glanzenberg railway station =

Railway station in Canton of Zürich, Switzerland

Glanzenberg
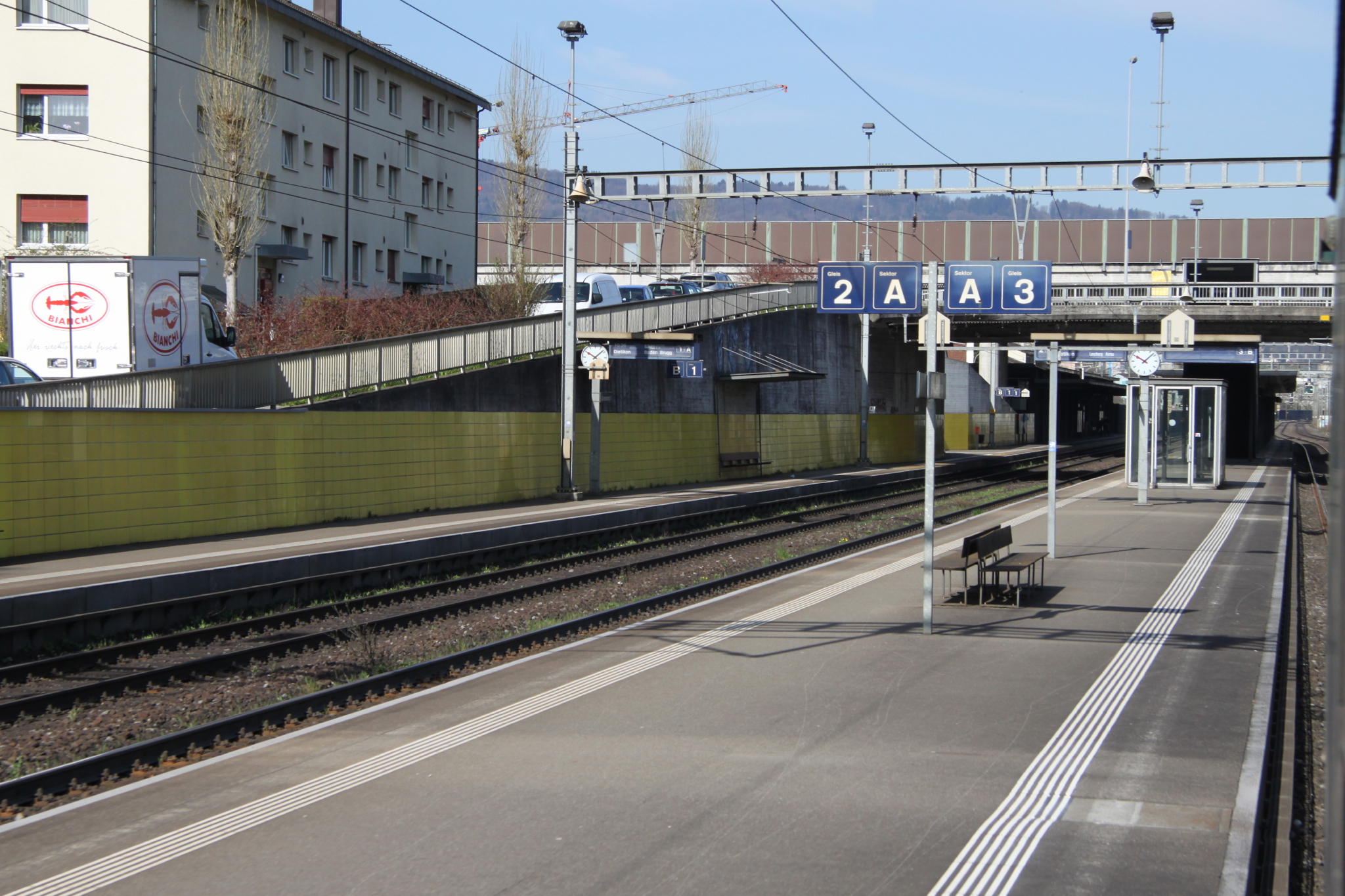
- The platforms in 2015

General information
- Location: Dietikon, Zürich; Switzerland
- Coordinates: 47°23′55″N 8°25′17″E
- Elevation: 389 m (1,276 ft)
- Owner: Swiss Federal Railways
- Line: Zurich–Baden railway line
- Platforms: 1 island platform, 1 side platform
- Tracks: 4
- Train operators: Swiss Federal Railways
- Connections: VBZ bus route 317

Other information
- Fare zone: 154 (ZVV)

Services
Preceding station	Zurich S-Bahn	Following station
Dietikon towards Aarau	S11	Schlieren towards Seuzach or Wila
Dietikon towards Brugg AG	S12	Schlieren towards Schaffhausen or Wil
Dietikon towards Aarau	SN1 Limited service	Schlieren towards Winterthur
Dietikon towards Olten	SN11 Limited service	Schlieren towards Winterthur
Location
- Location within Switzerland Location within Canton of Zürich

Glanzenberg railway station (German: Bahnhof Glanzenberg) is a railway station in the Swiss canton of Zurich, situated in the city of Dietikon. The station is located on the Zurich to Olten main line, within fare zone 154 of ZVV.

== Services ==
Glanzenberg is a stop of two Zurich S-Bahn lines: the S11, which operates between Aarau and Seuzach/Wila, and the S12, which runs between Brugg and Schaffhausen/Wil, both via Zurich and Winterthur. As of the December 2023 timetable change, the following services stop at Glanzenberg:

- Zurich S-Bahn:
  - S11: half-hourly service between Aarau and Winterthur; hourly service to Seuzach or Sennhof-Kyburg; rush-hour service to Wila.
  - S12: half-hourly service between Brugg AG and Winterthur; hourly service to Schaffhausen or Wil.

During weekends, there are also two nighttime S-Bahn services (SN1, SN11) calling at the station, offered by ZVV:

- SN1: on Friday and Saturday night, hourly service between Aarau and Winterthur via Zürich Stadelhofen.
- SN11: on Friday and Saturday night, hourly service between Winterthur and Olten.

Verkehrsbetriebe Zürich (VBZ) buses depart from a bus stop adjacent to the railway station.

== See also ==
- Rail transport in Switzerland
