= Rikon railway station =

Railway station in Zürich, Switzerland

Rikon
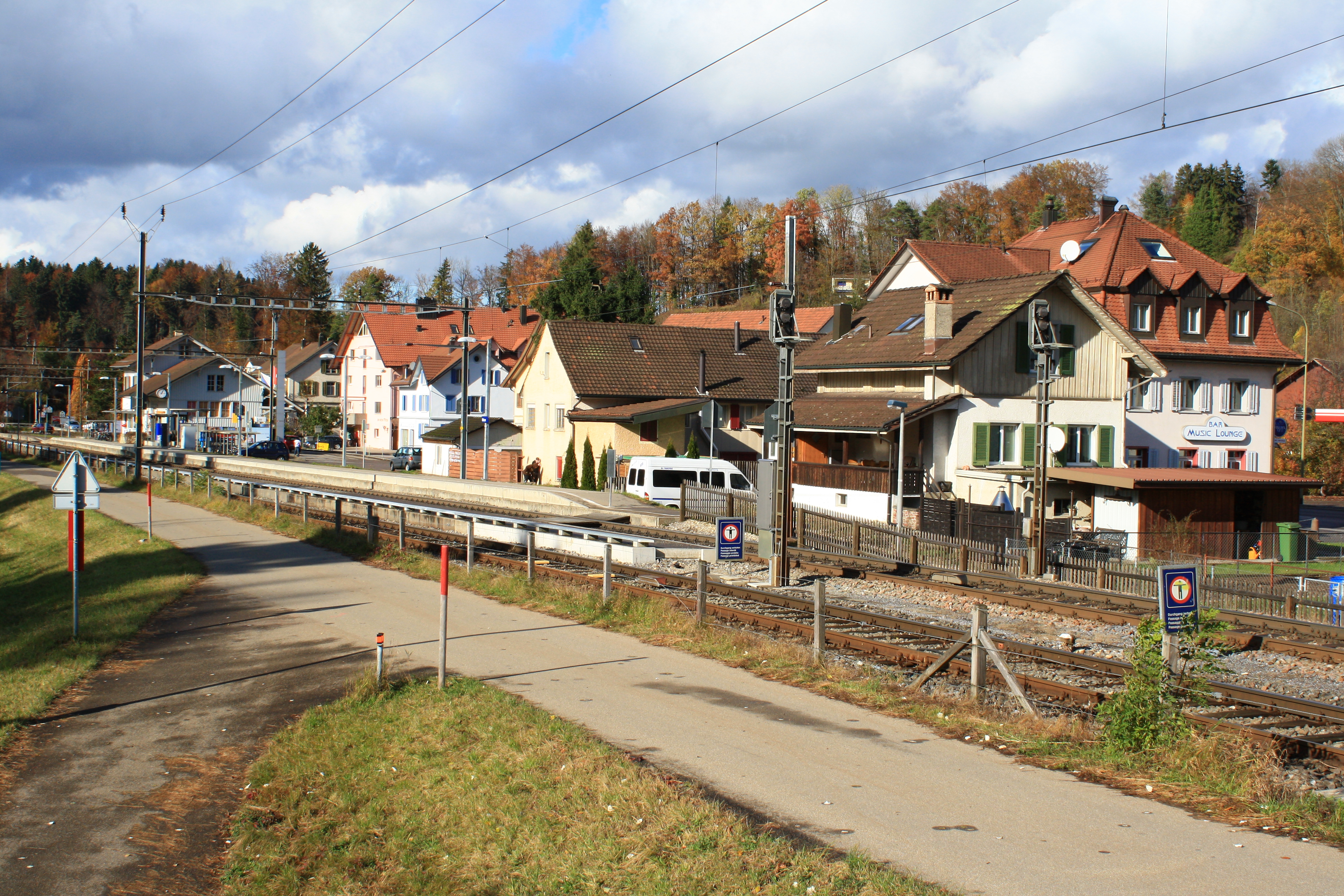

General information
- Location: Tösstalstrasse, Rikon im Tösstal, Zell, Canton of Zurich, Switzerland
- Coordinates: 47.444503°N 8.796551°E
- Elevation: 512 m (1,680 ft)
- Owner: Swiss Federal Railways
- Operator: Swiss Federal Railways; Thurbo
- Line: Tösstalbahn
- Platforms: 2 side platforms
- Tracks: 2

Other information
- Fare zone: 170 (ZVV)

Services
Preceding station	Zurich S-Bahn	Following station
Kollbrunn towards Aarau	S11	Rämismühle-Zell towards Wila
Kollbrunn towards Winterthur	S26	Rämismühle-Zell towards Rüti ZH
Location
- Location within Switzerland Location within Canton of Zurich

Rikon railway station is a railway station in the Swiss canton of Zurich. The station is situated in the village of Rikon im Tösstal within the municipality of Zell (Töss Valley). It is located on the Töss Valley railway line (Tösstalbahn) between Winterthur and Rüti ZH, within fare zone 170 of the Zürcher Verkehrsverbund (ZVV).

== Services ==
The station is served by Zurich S-Bahn lines S11 (peak-hour only, since the 2019 timetable change) and S26.

- Zurich S-Bahn
  - S11: hourly service (peak-hour only) between Wila and Aarau, via Zürich HB
  - S26: half-hourly service between Winterthur and Rüti ZH

== Gallery ==
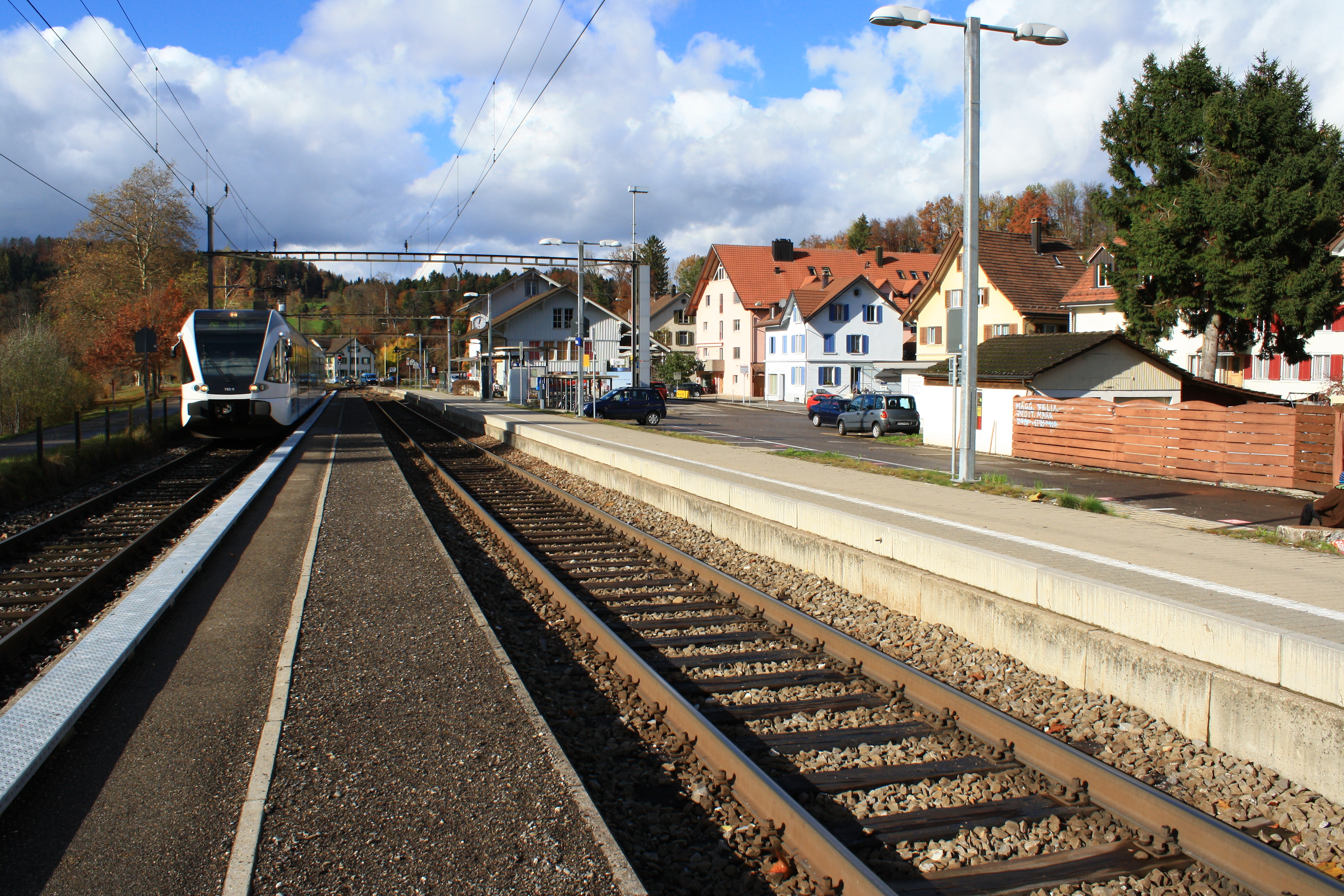
Station platforms

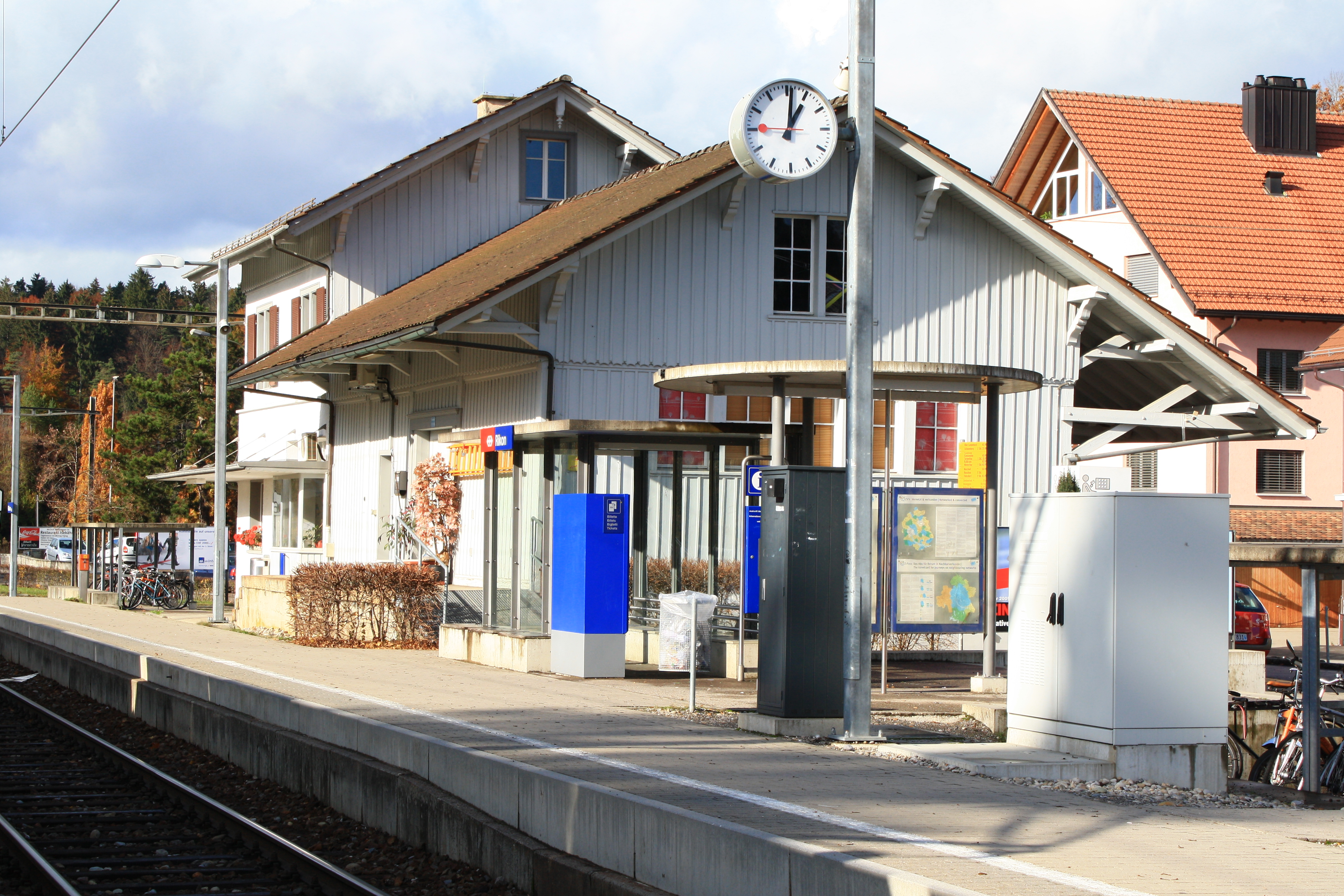
Station building

== See also ==
- Rail transport in Switzerland
