= Bichelsee =

Village in the canton of Thurgau, Switzerland

Coordinates: 47°27′N 8°56′E

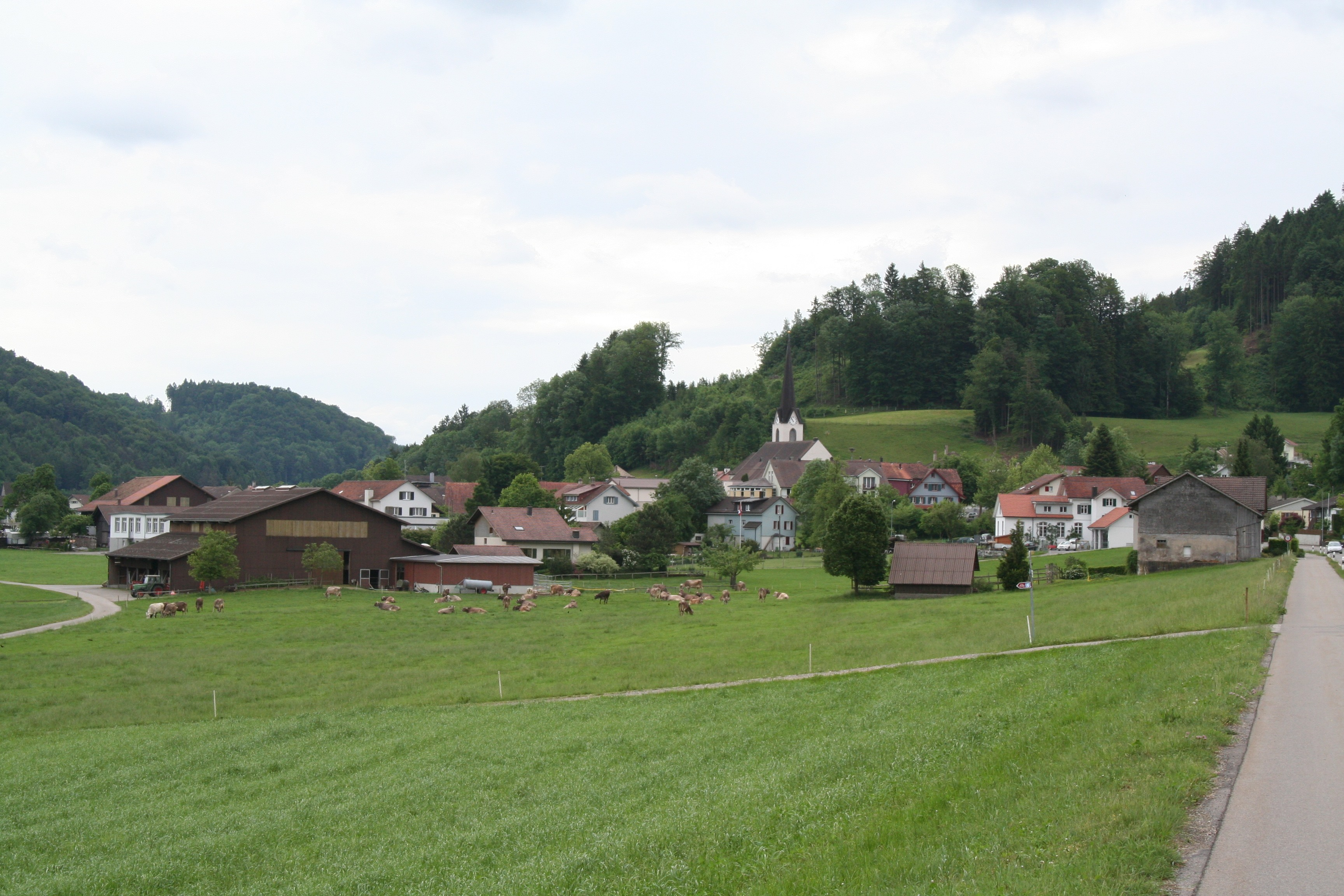
Bichelsee village

Bichelsee is a village and former municipality in the canton of Thurgau, Switzerland. It takes its name from the nearby lake, Bichelsee.

The municipality also contained the villages Höfli, Niederhofen am Bichelsee and Itaslen.

== History ==
Bichelsee is first mentioned in 894 as Pichelense. The Udalrichinger family donated the village of Bichelsee, in the Early Middle Ages, to the Abbey of St. Gallen. During the High Middle Ages, the Bichelsee family ruled the village as a fief for the Abbey. Originally they ruled from Alt-Bichelsee Castle, though in the early 13th century, they built Neu-Bichelsee Castle. This castle was destroyed in 1274 by the Habsburgs. In 1358 Hermann IV of Landsberg-Greifensee acquired Alt-Bichelsee Castle along with various rights and possessions, including the bailiwick of Balterswil. In 1407, Alt-Bichelsee was burned by Appenzell troops. After rebuilding the castle, the Abbey of Fischingen bought the castle, land and parish in 1419–21. It remained part of the Fischingen court until 1798. However, the village of Itaslen was not part of Bichelsee at this time. It was part of the Tannegg district and an independent municipality until 1812.

The parish church of St. Nicholas (later St. Blasius church) was occupied from 1275 and probably built in the 12th century under the leadership of Fischingen Abbey. The Abbey supported the church until 1769. In 1529 the village converted to the new faith during the Protestant Reformation in 1529, but returned to their old faith in 1542 during the Counter-Reformation. The Reformed church members were part of the parish of Dussnang since 1550. St. Blasius church remained a shared church, even after a new church was built in 1864, until 1954. In 1960 a new Reformed church was built.

Agriculture and small industries still dominated the local economy until the late 20th century. Since the end of the 19th century, cropland and orchards have been segregated from the dairy industry. Small-scale home weaving and embroidery became common in the early 19th century but declined by about 1900. In 1899, Johann Evangelist Traber founded the first Swiss Raiffeisen bank. The largest employer is the Traxler AG embroidery firm (founded 1908). With increased immigration after 1970 and the construction of many new houses, it became a commuter town; by 1990, about 62% of the population commuted.

In 1996 the municipality was merged with the neighboring municipality Balterswil to form a new and larger municipality Bichelsee-Balterswil.

== Historic population ==
The historical population is given in the following table:

Year	Population, Bichelsee Village	Population, Bichelsee Bürgergemeinde
1850	-	1,071
1870	605	953
1900	728	1,205
1910	782	1,442
1950	691	1,417
1970	696	1,554
1990	935	2,065
