= Schlossberg Textil =

Swiss manufacturer of bed linen

Schlossberg Switzerland AG
- Founded: 1833; 192 years ago
- Headquarters: Turbenthal, Zurich, Switzerland
- Website: schlossberg.ch

Schlossberg Switzerland AG is a Swiss manufacturer of bed linen. The company was founded in 1833 and is based in Turbenthal in the Toss Valley and the canton of Zurich.
