= Turbenthal railway station =

Railway station in Switzerland

Turbenthal
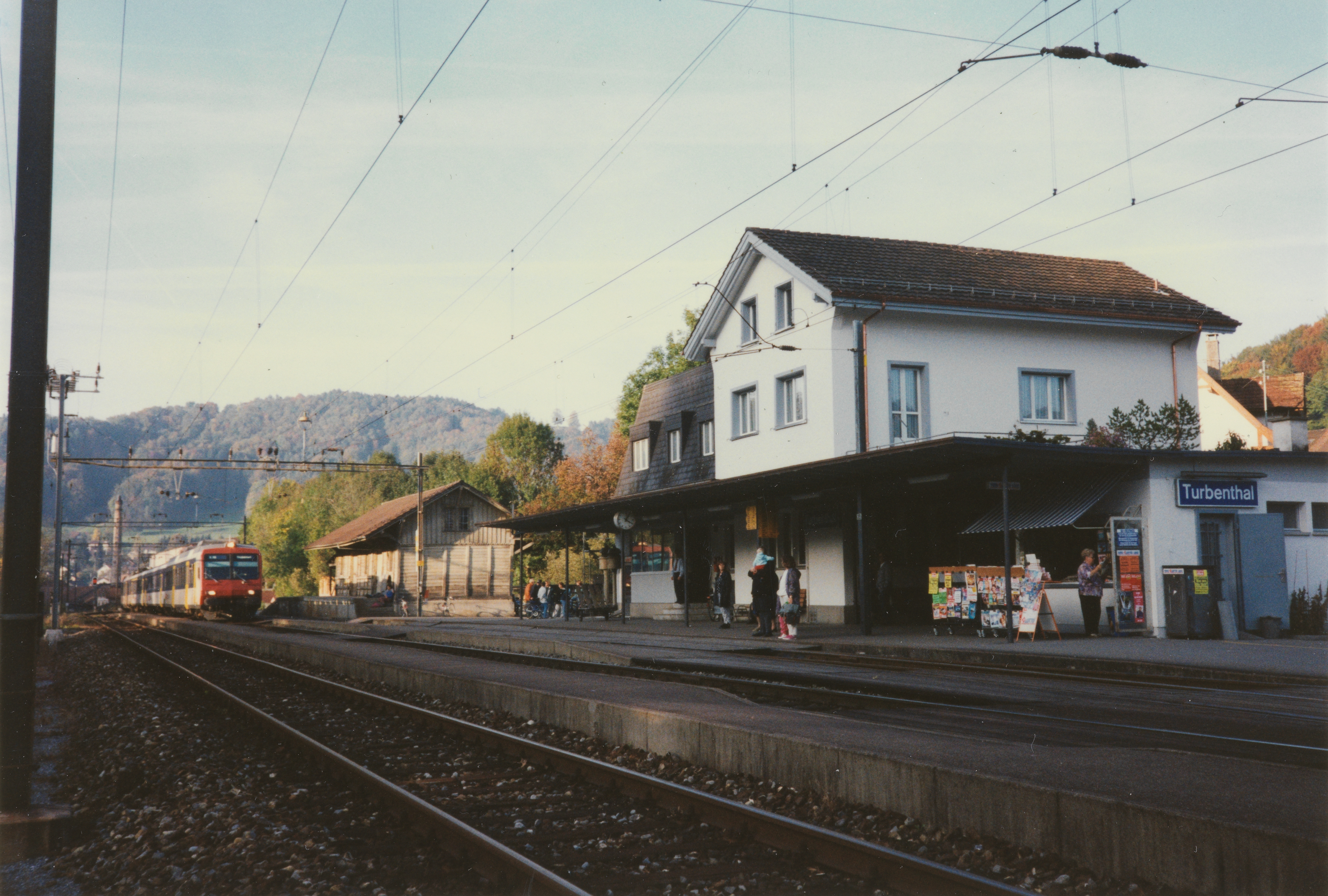
- The station in 1994

General information
- Location: Bahnhofplatz; Turbenthal, Zurich; Switzerland
- Coordinates: 47.437268°N 8.843586°E
- Elevation: 550 m (1,800 ft)
- Owner: Swiss Federal Railways
- Operator: Swiss Federal Railways; Thurbo
- Line: Tösstalbahn
- Platforms: 1 side platform
- Tracks: 2
- Connections
- Bus: PostAuto bus routes 806 807 825

Other information
- Fare zone: 171 (ZVV)

Services
Preceding station	Zurich S-Bahn	Following station
Rämismühle-Zell towards Aarau	S11	Wila Terminus
Rämismühle-Zell towards Winterthur	S26	Wila towards Rüti ZH
Location
- Location within Switzerland Location within Canton of Zurich

Turbenthal railway station is a railway station in the Swiss canton of Zurich. The station is situated in the municipality of Turbenthal. It is located on the Töss Valley railway line (Tösstalbahn) between Winterthur and Rüti ZH, within fare zone 171 of the Zürcher Verkehrsverbund (ZVV).

== Services ==
The station is served by Zurich S-Bahn lines S11 (peak-hour only) and S26.

- Zurich S-Bahn
  - S11: hourly service (peak-hour only) between Wila and Aarau, via Zürich HB
  - S26: half-hourly service between Winterthur and Rüti ZH

== See also ==
- Rail transport in Switzerland
