= Bichelsee-Balterswil =

- Municipality
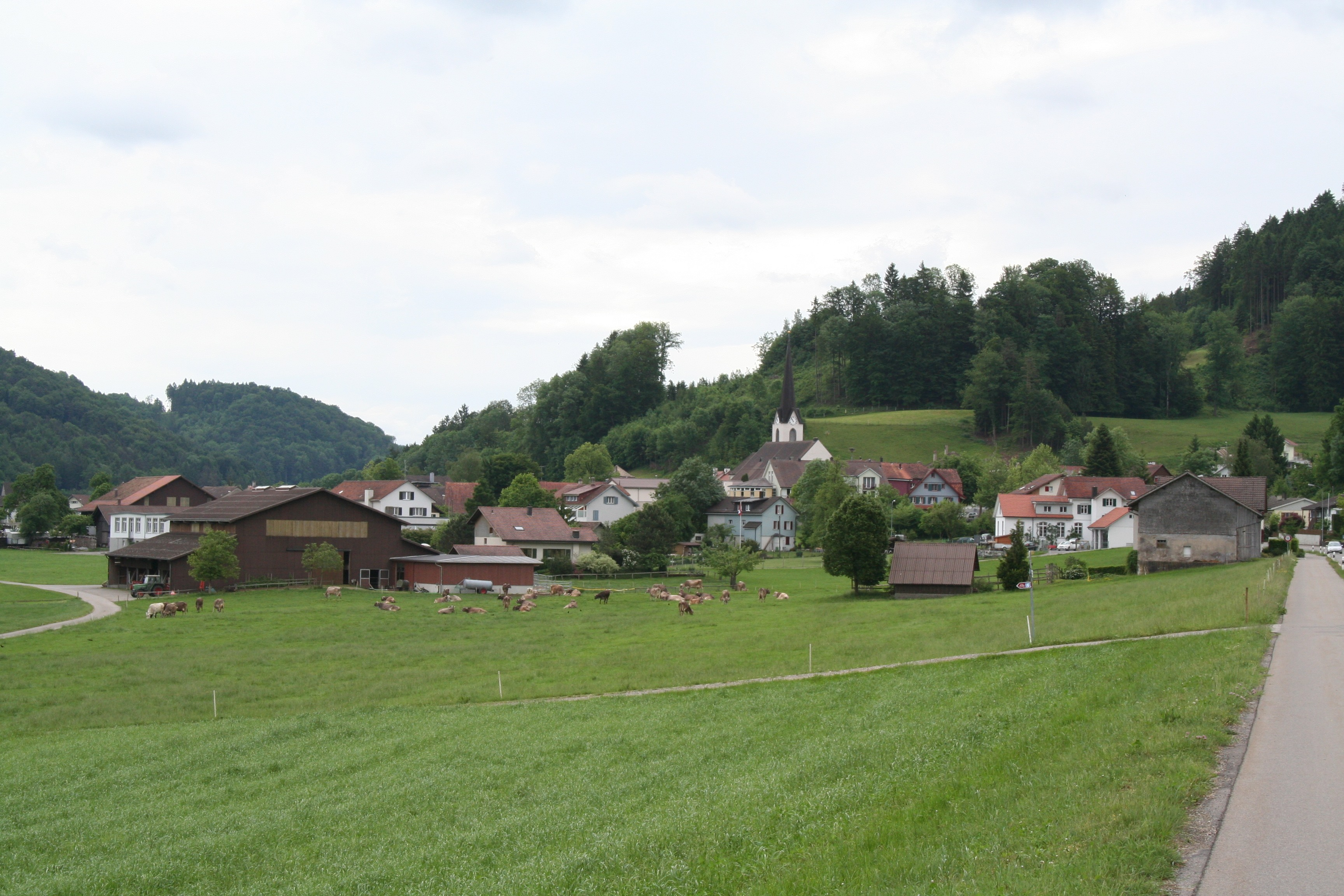
- Bichelsee village

- Coat of arms
- Location of Bichelsee-Balterswil
- Location within Switzerland Location within Canton of Thurgau
- Coordinates: 47°27′N 8°55′E
- Country: Switzerland
- Canton: Thurgau
- District: Münchwilen

Area
  - Total: 12.27 km^{2} (4.74 sq mi)
- Elevation: 601 m (1,972 ft)

Population (December 2007)
  - Total: 2,461
  - Density: 200.6/km^{2} (519.5/sq mi)
- Time zone: UTC+01:00 (CET)
  - Summer (DST): UTC+02:00 (CEST)
- Postal code: 8362
- SFOS number: 4721
- ISO 3166 code: CH-TG
- Surrounded by: Aadorf, Eschlikon, Fischingen, Hofstetten bei Elgg (ZH), Turbenthal (ZH), Wängi
- Website: www.bichelsee-balterswil.ch

Bichelsee-Balterswil is a municipality in the district of Münchwilen in the canton of Thurgau in Switzerland. It was formed from the union on January 1, 1996, of Bichelsee and Balterswil.

== History ==
It was created in 1996 when the former municipalities of Balterswil and Bichelsee merged. Bichelsee is first mentioned in 894 as Pichelense and Balterswil is mentioned in 885 as Baldherreswilare.

=== Bichelsee ===
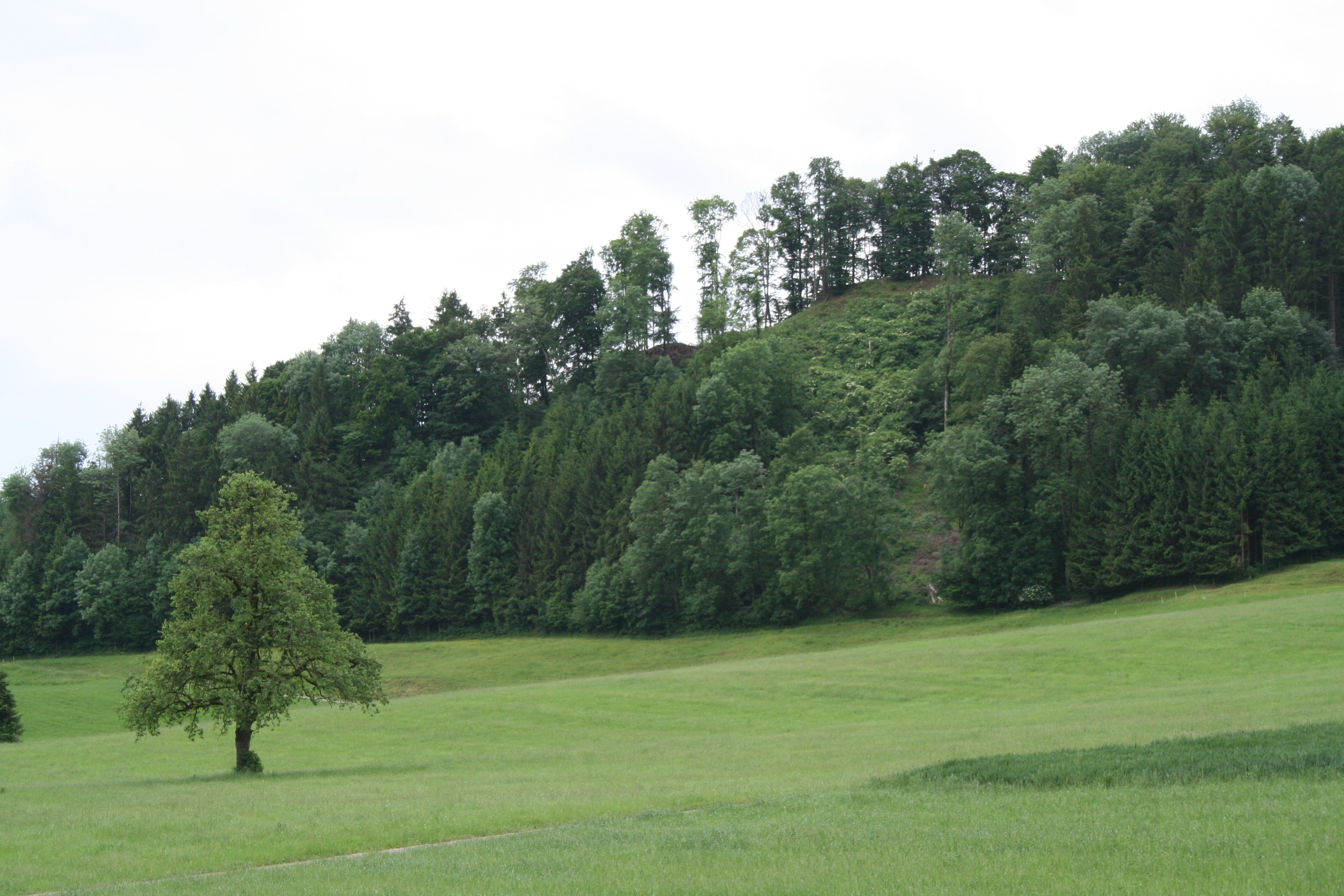
Bichelsee Castle hill

The Udalrichinger family donated the village of Bichelsee, in the Early Middle Ages, to the Abbey of St. Gallen. During the High Middle Ages, the Bichelsee family ruled the village as a fief for the Abbey. Originally they ruled from Alt-Bichelsee Castle, though in the early 13th century, they built Neu-Bichelsee Castle. This castle was destroyed in 1274 by the Habsburgs. In 1358 Hermann IV of Landsberg-Greifensee acquired Alt-Bichelsee Castle along with various rights and possessions, including the bailiwick of Balterswil. In 1407, Alt-Bichelsee was burned by Appenzell troops. After rebuilding the castle, the Abbey of Fischingen bought the castle, land and parish in 1419–21. It remained part of the Fischingen court until 1798. However, the village of Itaslen was not part of Bichelsee at this time. It was part of the Tannegg district and an independent municipality until 1812.

The parish church of St. Nicholas (later St. Blasius church) was occupied from 1275 and probably built in the 12th century under the leadership of Fischingen Abbey. The Abbey supported the church until 1769. In 1529 the village converted to the new faith during the Protestant Reformation in 1529, but returned to their old faith in 1542 during the Counter-Reformation. The Reformed church members were part of the parish of Dussnang since 1550. St. Blasius church remained a shared church, even after a new church was built in 1864, until 1954. In 1960 a new Reformed church was built.

Agriculture and small industries still dominated the local economy until the late 20th century. Since the end of the 19th century, cropland and orchards have been segregated from the dairy industry. Small-scale home weaving and embroidery became common in the early 19th century but declined by about 1900. In 1899, Johann Evangelist Traber founded the first Swiss Raiffeisen bank. The largest employer is the Traxler AG embroidery firm (founded 1908). With increased immigration after 1970 and the construction of many new houses, it became a commuter town; by 1990, about 62% of the population commuted.

=== Balterswil ===
Balterswil was owned in the Late Middle Ages by the Lords of Bichelsee. In 1419 it was given by the Landenberger's to Fischingen Abbey. Until 1798 it was part of the old court of Fischinger. In 1521, certain farm land usage rights were extended to Ifwil, followed in 1651 by limited civil benefits to existing farmsteads. In 1884 an arsonist caused a large fire in the village.

It was always part of the Bichelsee parish. The major sources of income were vineyards, fields and orchards, and peat extraction until the 19th century, when the livestock industry moved into the village. By 1900, there were several small embroidery businesses, but local economy remained rooted in small businesses and agriculture until around 1970. Between 1941 and 1950 the Riet Soor marsh was drained which opened up additional land. In 1979 a freight storage and transshipping facility opened. The late 20th-century economy included a pneumatic equipment company (est. 1950), a storage facilities company (with a total of about 250 employees), and numerous residential buildings in the village.

== Geography ==
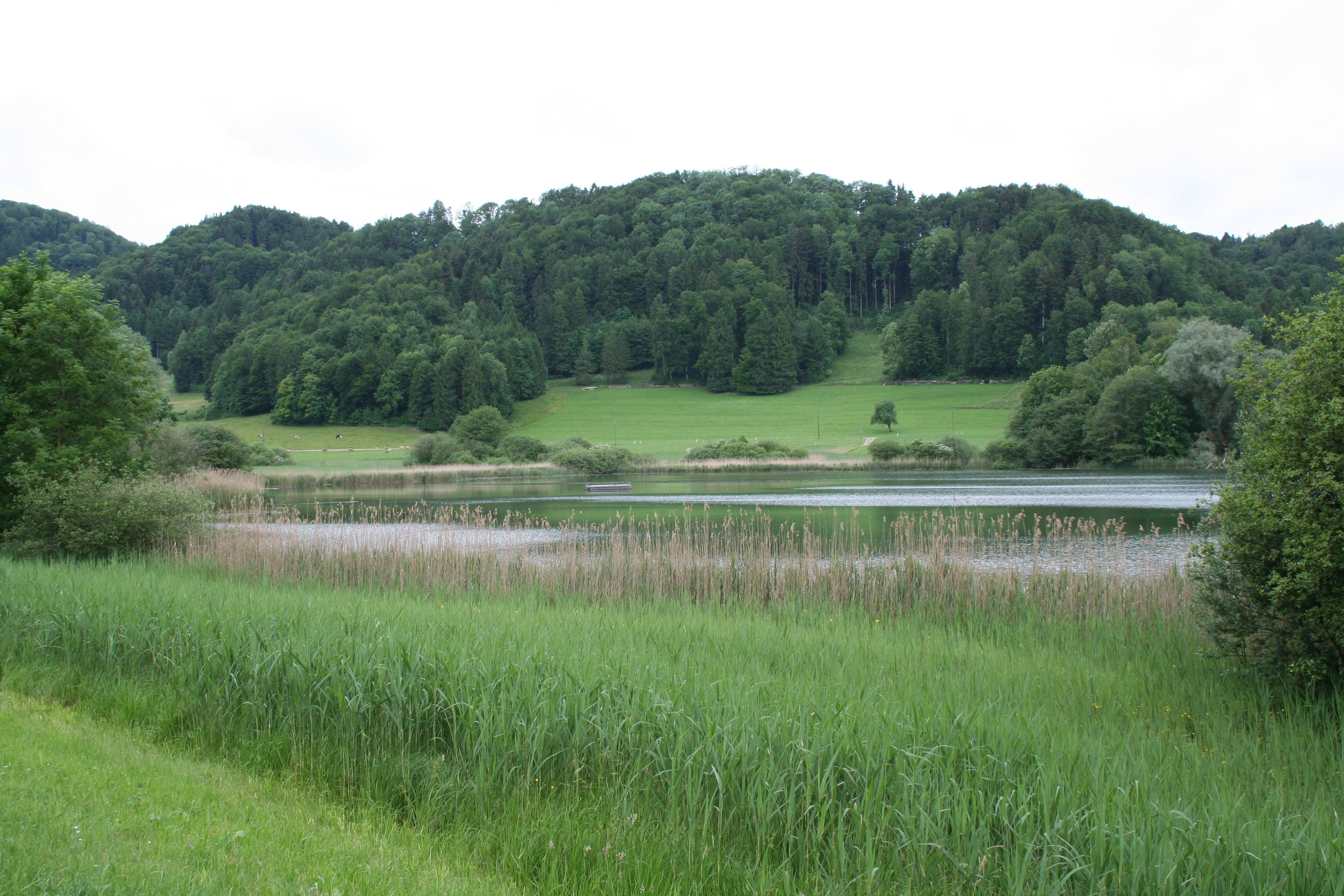
Bichelsee lake

Bichelsee-Balterswil has an area, as of 2009, of 12.27 square kilometers (4.74 sq mi). Of this area, 6.27 km^{2} (2.42 sq mi) or 51.1% is used for agricultural purposes, while 4.52 km^{2} (1.75 sq mi) or 36.8% is forested. Of the rest of the land, 1.18 km^{2} (0.46 sq mi) or 9.6% is settled (buildings or roads), 0.16 km^{2} (0.062 sq mi) or 1.3% is either rivers or lakes and 0.02 km^{2} (4.9 acres) or 0.2% is unproductive land.

Of the built up area, industrial buildings made up 4.8% of the total area while housing and buildings made up 0.7% and transportation infrastructure made up 0.5%. while parks, green belts and sports fields made up 3.6%. Out of the forested land, 35.0% of the total land area is heavily forested and 1.9% is covered with orchards or small clusters of trees. Of the agricultural land, 49.2% is used for growing crops, while 1.9% is used for orchards or vine crops. Of the water in the municipality, 0.6% is in lakes and 0.7% is in rivers and streams.

The municipality is located in the Münchwilen district. It consists of the villages of Bichelsee and Balterswil and the hamlets of Höfli, Niederhofen am Bichelsee, Itaslen, Zielwies, Ifwil and Lochwies. The lake Bichelsee is located in the municipality.

== Demographics ==
Bichelsee-Balterswil has a population (as of December 2020) of 2,949. As of 2008, 8.7% of the population was foreign nationals. Over the ten-year period from 1997 to 2007, the population changed at a rate of 8.9%. Most of the population (as of 2000) spoke German (94.1%), with Italian being second most common ( 2.0%) and Albanian being third ( 1.2%).

As of 2008, the gender distribution of the population was 51.0% male and 49.0% female. The population was made up of 1,170 Swiss men (46.2% of the population), and 121 (4.8%) non-Swiss men. There were 1,143 Swiss women (45.1%), and 99 (3.9%) non-Swiss women.

In 2008 there were 26 live births to Swiss citizens and 2 births to non-Swiss citizens, and in same time span there were 22 deaths of Swiss citizens. Ignoring immigration and emigration, the population of Swiss citizens increased by 4 while the foreign population increased by 2. There were 2 Swiss men who emigrated from Switzerland to another country, 5 Swiss women who emigrated from Switzerland to another country, 2 non-Swiss men who emigrated from Switzerland to another country and 10 non-Swiss women who emigrated from Switzerland to another country. The total Swiss population change in 2008 (from all sources) was an increase of 42 and the non-Swiss population change was an increase of 25 people. This represents a population growth rate of 2.7%.

The age distribution, as of 2009, was: 272 children (or 10.6% of the population) were between 0 and 9 years old, and 338 teenagers (or 13.1%) were between 10 and 19. Of the adult population, 295 people (11.5%) were between 20 and 29 years old. 302 people (11.7%) were between 30 and 39, 472 people (18.3%) were between 40 and 49, and 365 people (14.2%) were between 50 and 59. The senior population distribution was 306 people (11.9%) between 60 and 69 years old, 128 people (5.0%) between 70 and 79, 85 people (3.3%) between 80 and 89, and 12 people (0.5%) older than 89.

As of 2000, there were 869 private households in the municipality, and an average of 2.6 persons per household. In 2000 there were 474 single family homes (or 85.3% of the total) out of a total of 556 inhabited buildings. There were 39 two family buildings (7.0%), 15 three family buildings (2.7%) and 28 multi-family buildings (or 5.0%). There were 512 (or 22.5%) persons who were part of a couple without children, and 1,387 (or 60.9%) who were part of a couple with children. There were 97 (or 4.3%) people who lived in single parent home, while there are 12 persons who were adult children living with one or both parents, 6 persons who lived in a household made up of relatives, 8 who lived in a household made up of unrelated persons, and 25 who are either institutionalized or live in another type of collective housing.

The vacancy rate for the municipality, in 2008, was 0.28%. As of 2007, the construction rate of new housing units was 8.1 new units per 1000 residents. In 2000 there were 952 apartments in the municipality. The most common apartment size was the 6 room apartment of which there were 249. There were 11 single room apartments and 249 apartments with six or more rooms. As of 2000 the average price to rent an average apartment in Bichelsee-Balterswil was 970.05 Swiss francs (CHF) per month (US$780, £440, €620 approx. exchange rate from 2000). The average rate for a one-room apartment was 247.00 CHF (US$200, £110, €160), a two-room apartment was about 619.44 CHF (US$500, £280, €400), a three-room apartment was about 856.95 CHF (US$690, £390, €550) and a six or more room apartment cost an average of 1497.87 CHF (US$1200, £670, €960). The average apartment price in Bichelsee-Balterswil was 86.9% of the national average of 1116 CHF.

In the 2011 federal election the most popular party was the SVP which received 38.77% of the vote. The next three most popular parties were the CVP (28.22%), the SP (6.44%) and the FDP (6.30%). In the federal election, a total of 913 votes were cast, and the voter turnout was 49.3%.

The historical population is given in the following table:

Year	Population Bichelsee	Population Balterswil
1870	605	348
1900	728	477
1910	782	660
1950	691	726
1970	696	-
1990	935	1,130
Year	Population, Bichelsee-Balterswil	
2000	2,277	

== Economy ==
As of 2007, Bichelsee-Balterswil had an unemployment rate of 1.28%. As of 2005, there were 99 people employed in the primary economic sector and about 43 businesses involved in this sector. 426 people are employed in the secondary sector and there are 42 businesses in this sector. 266 people are employed in the tertiary sector, with 76 businesses in this sector.

In 2000 there were 1,597 workers who lived in the municipality. Of these, 776 or about 48.6% of the residents worked outside Bichelsee-Balterswil while 350 people commuted into the municipality for work. There were a total of 1,171 jobs (of at least 6 hours per week) in the municipality. Of the working population, 10% used public transportation to get to work, and 49.8% used a private car.

== Religion ==
From the 2000 census, 1,141 or 50.1% were Roman Catholic, while 787 or 34.6% belonged to the Swiss Reformed Church. Of the rest of the population, there is 1 individual who belongs to the Orthodox Church, and there are 80 individuals (or about 3.51% of the population) who belong to another Christian church. There were 81 (or about 3.56% of the population) who are Islamic. There are 4 individuals (or about 0.18% of the population) who belong to another church (not listed on the census), 143 (or about 6.28% of the population) belong to no church, are agnostic or atheist, and 40 individuals (or about 1.76% of the population) did not answer the question.

== Education ==
The entire Swiss population is generally well educated. In Bichelsee-Balterswil about 76.9% of the population (between age 25–64) have completed either non-mandatory upper secondary education or additional higher education (either university or a Fachhochschule).

Bichelsee-Balterswil is home to the Bichelsee-Balterswil primary and secondary school district. In the 2008/2009 school year there were 290 students at either the primary or secondary levels. There were 58 children in the kindergarten, and the average class size was 14.5 kindergartners. Of the children in kindergarten, 24 or 41.4% were female, 5 or 8.6% were not Swiss citizens and 2 or 3.4% did not speak German natively. The lower and upper primary levels begin at about age 5-6 and last for 6 years. There were 96 children in who were at the lower primary level and 85 children in the upper primary level. The average class size in the primary school was 20.11 students. At the lower primary level, there were 57 children or 59.4% of the total population who were female, 4 or 4.2% were not Swiss citizens and 2 or 2.1% did not speak German natively. In the upper primary level, there were 41 or 48.2% who were female, 4 or 4.7% were not Swiss citizens and 3 or 3.5% did not speak German natively.

At the secondary level, students are divided according to performance. The secondary level begins at about age 12 and usually lasts 3 years. There were 62 teenagers who were in the advanced school, of which 34 or 54.8% were female, 2 or 3.2% were not Swiss citizens and 1 or 1.6% did not speak German natively. There were 47 teenagers who were in the standard school, of which 21 or 44.7% were female, 6 or 12.8% were not Swiss citizens and 4 or 8.5% did not speak German natively. The average class size for all classes at the secondary level was 18.17 students.
