= Bichelsee (lake) =

Lake in the canton of Thurgau, Switzerland

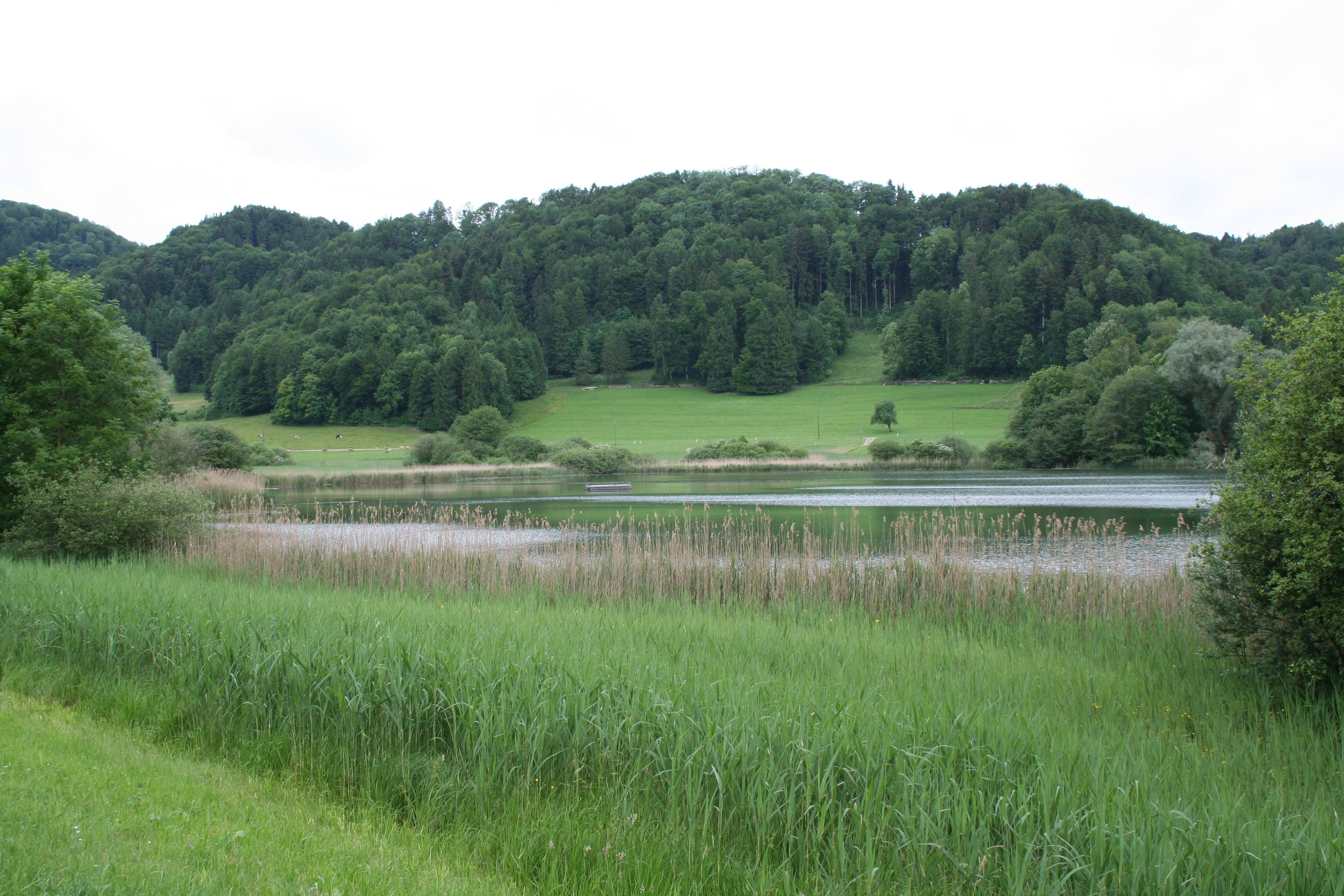

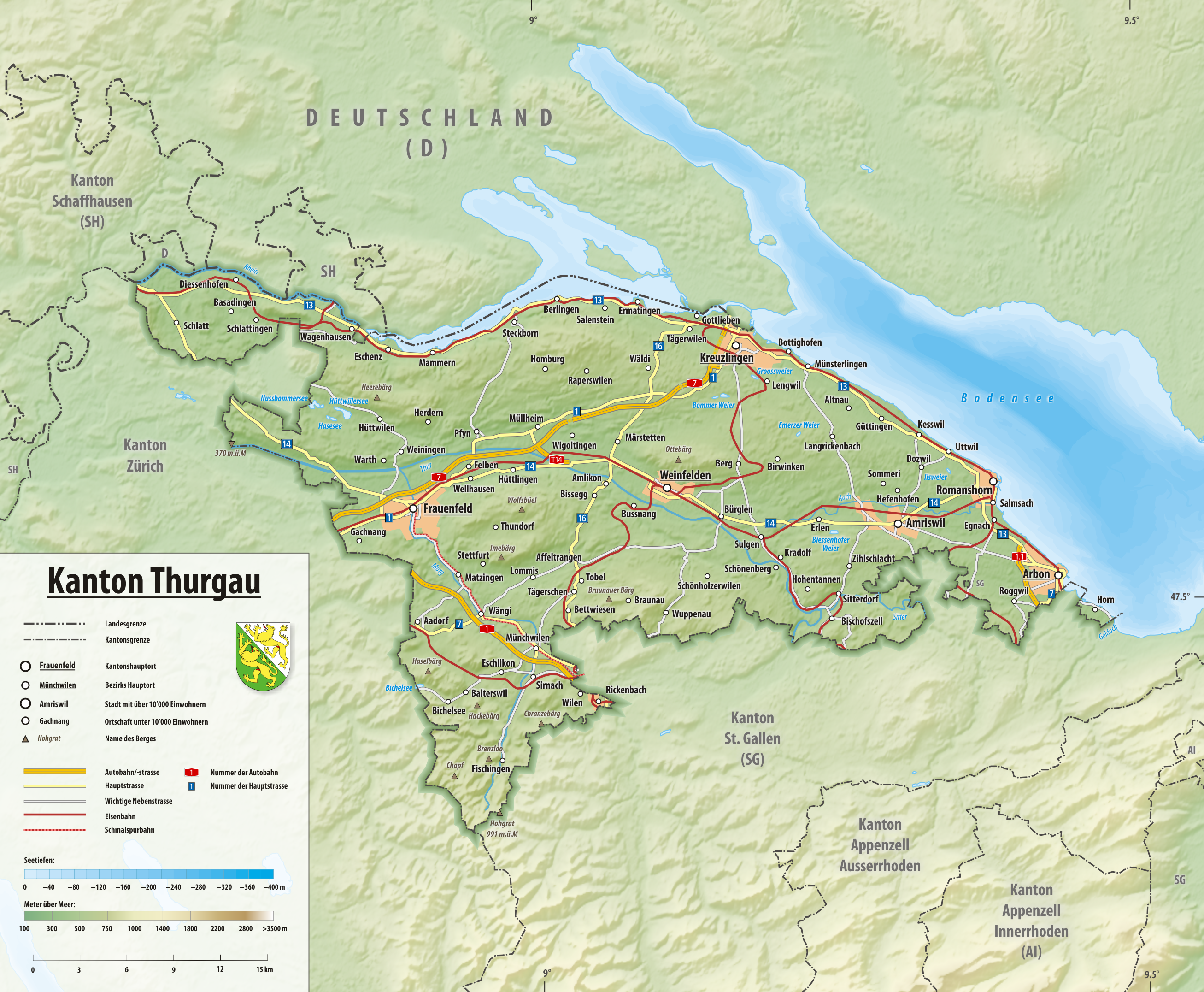
- Location within Switzerland Location within Canton of Thurgau Location within Canton of Zurich
- Interactive map of Bichelsee
- Location: Thurgau, Zurich
- Coordinates: 47°27′27″N 8°54′01″E
- Basin countries: Switzerland
- Max. length: 475 m (1,558 ft)
- Surface area: 0.092 km^{2} (0.036 sq mi)
- Max. depth: 8.5 m (28 ft)
- Shore length^{1}: 1,235 m (4,052 ft)
- Surface elevation: 590 m (1,940 ft)
- ^{1} Shore length is not a well-defined measure.

Bichelsee is a lake located on the border of the cantons of Thurgau and Zurich, Switzerland. The village of Bichelsee in the municipality Bichelsee-Balterswil is named after the lake. Of the surface of 0.092 km^{2} (0.036 sq mi), 5/6 are located in the canton of Thurgau, the remainder in the canton of Zurich.
