= Balterswil =

Swiss village in the canton of Thurgau

Coordinates: 47°27′10″N 8°56′15″E

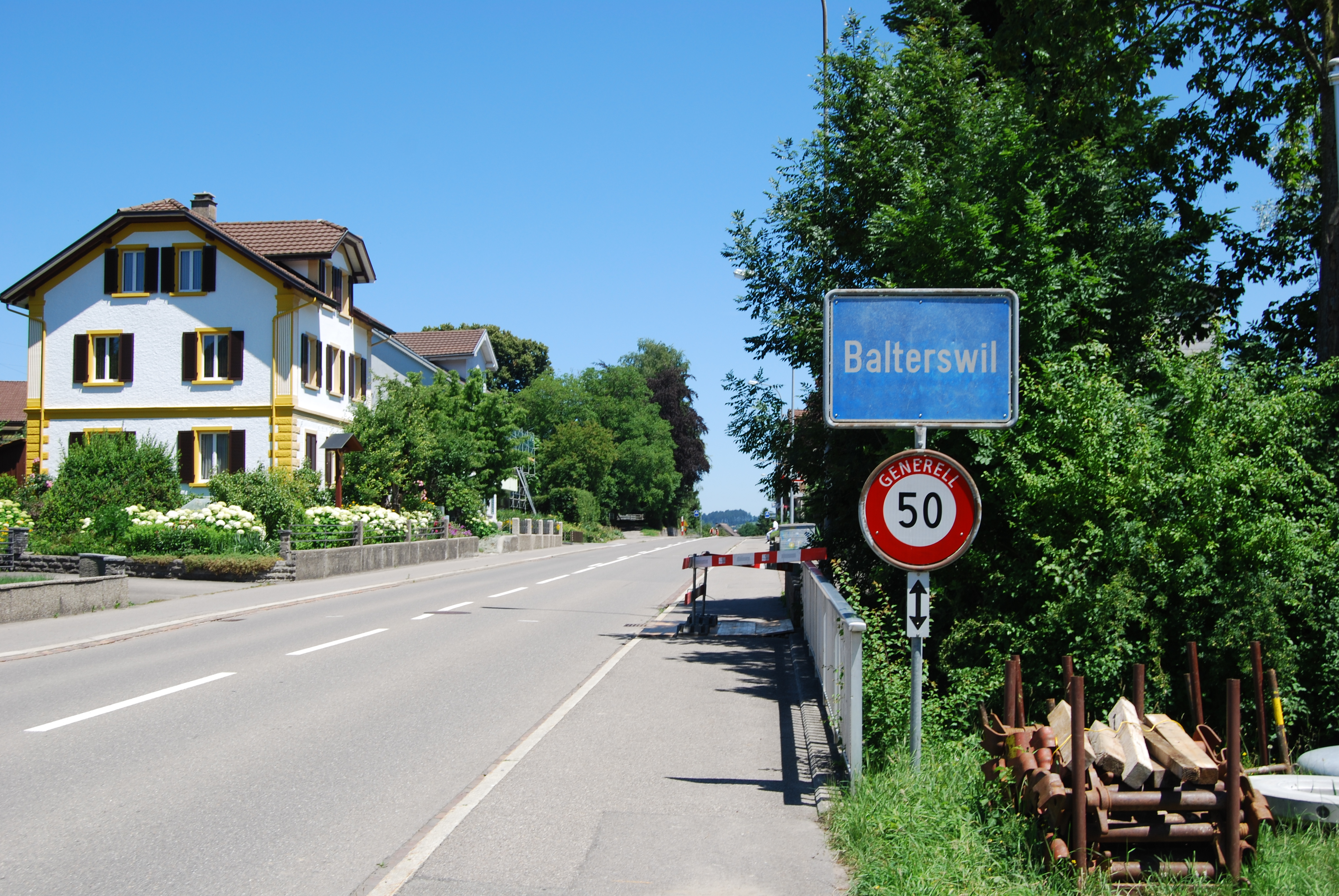
An image of Balterswil

Balterswil is a village and former municipality in the canton of Thurgau, Switzerland. The municipality also contained the villages Lützelmurg, Zielwies, Ifwil and Lochwies.

== History ==
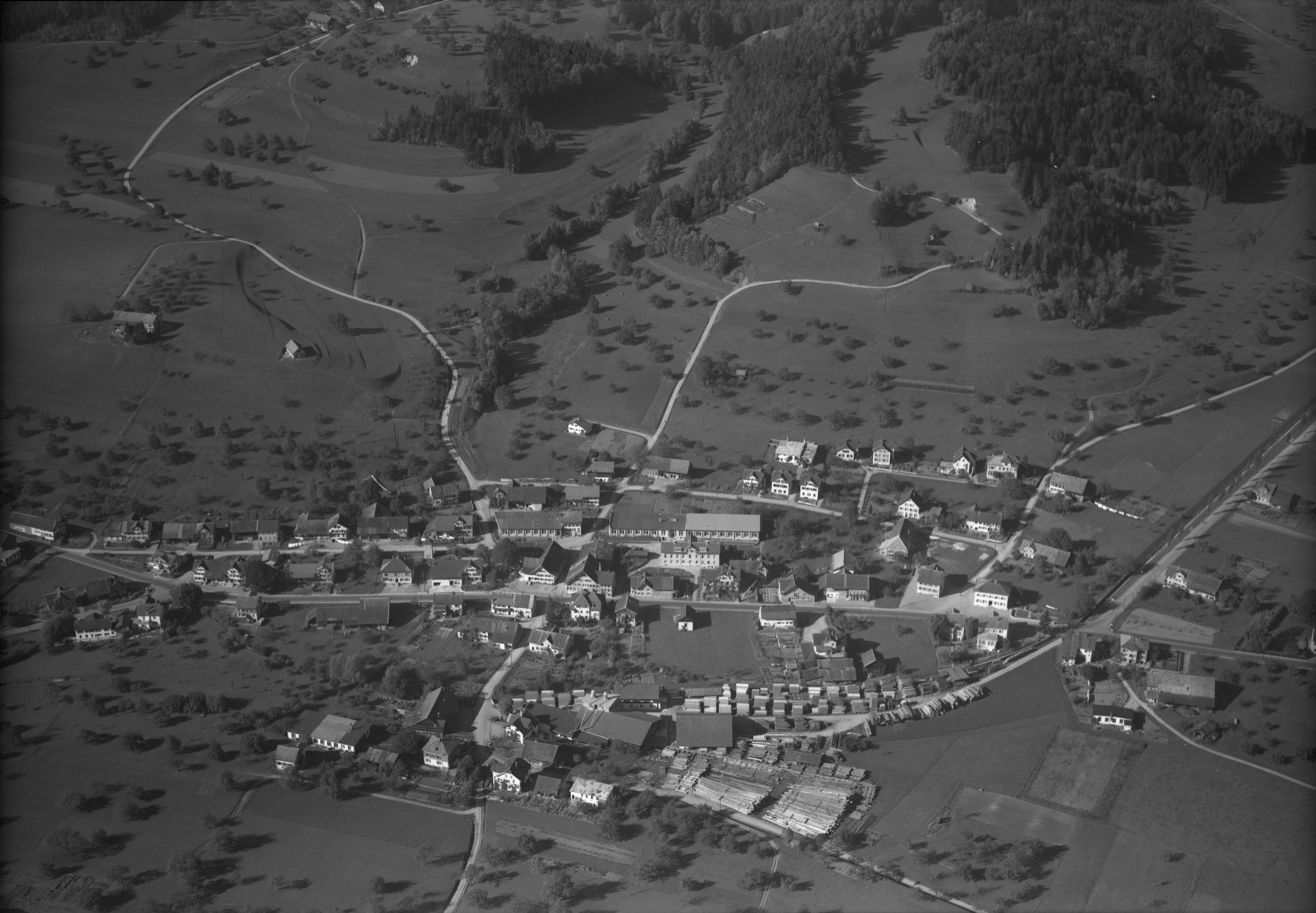
Aerial view (1949)

Balterswil is first mentioned in 885 as Baldherreswilare.

Balterswil was owned in the Late Middle Ages by the Lords of Bichelsee. In 1419 it was given by the Landenberger's to Fischingen Abbey. Until 1798 it was part of the old court of Fischinger. In 1521, certain farm land usage rights were extended to Ifwil, followed in 1651 by limited civil benefits to existing farmsteads. In 1884 an arsonist caused a large fire in the village.

It was always part of the Bichelsee parish. The major sources of income were vineyards, fields and orchards, and peat extraction until the 19th century, when the livestock industry moved into the village. By 1900, there were several small embroidery businesses, but local economy remained rooted in small businesses and agriculture until around 1970. Between 1941 and 1950 the Riet Soor marsh was drained which opened up additional land. In 1979 a freight storage and transshipping facility opened. The late-20th-century economy included a pneumatic equipment company (est. 1950), a storage facilities company (with a total of about 250 employees), and numerous residential buildings in the village.

In 1996 the municipality was merged with the neighboring municipality Bichelsee to form a new and larger municipality Bichelsee-Balterswil.

== Historic population ==
The historical population is given in the following table:

Year	Population
1870	348
1900	477
1910	660
1950	726
1990	1,130
