= Turbenthal =

- Municipality
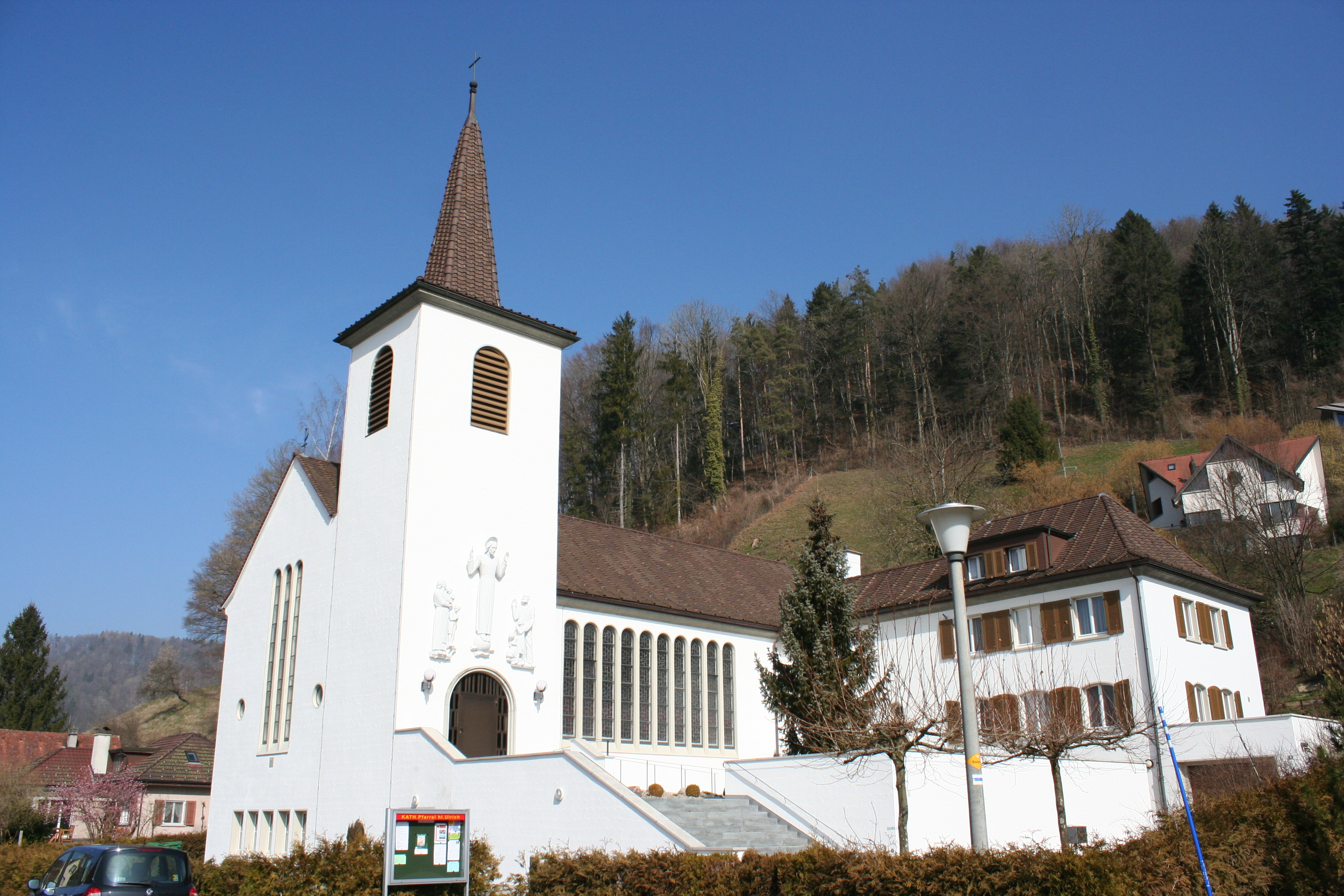

- Flag Coat of arms
- Location of Turbenthal
- Location within Switzerland Location within Canton of Zurich
- Coordinates: 47°26′N 8°51′E
- Country: Switzerland
- Canton: Zurich
- District: Winterthur

Area
  - Total: 25.07 km^{2} (9.68 sq mi)
- Elevation: 554 m (1,818 ft)

Population (December 2020)
  - Total: 4,983
  - Density: 198.8/km^{2} (514.8/sq mi)
- Time zone: UTC+01:00 (CET)
  - Summer (DST): UTC+02:00 (CEST)
- Postal code: 8488
- SFOS number: 228
- ISO 3166 code: CH-ZH
- Surrounded by: Aadorf (TG), Bichelsee-Balterswil (TG), Fischingen (TG), Hofstetten bei Elgg, Schlatt, Wila, Wildberg, Zell
- Website: www.turbenthal.ch

Turbenthal is a municipality in the district of Winterthur located in the canton of Zürich in Switzerland.

== Geography ==
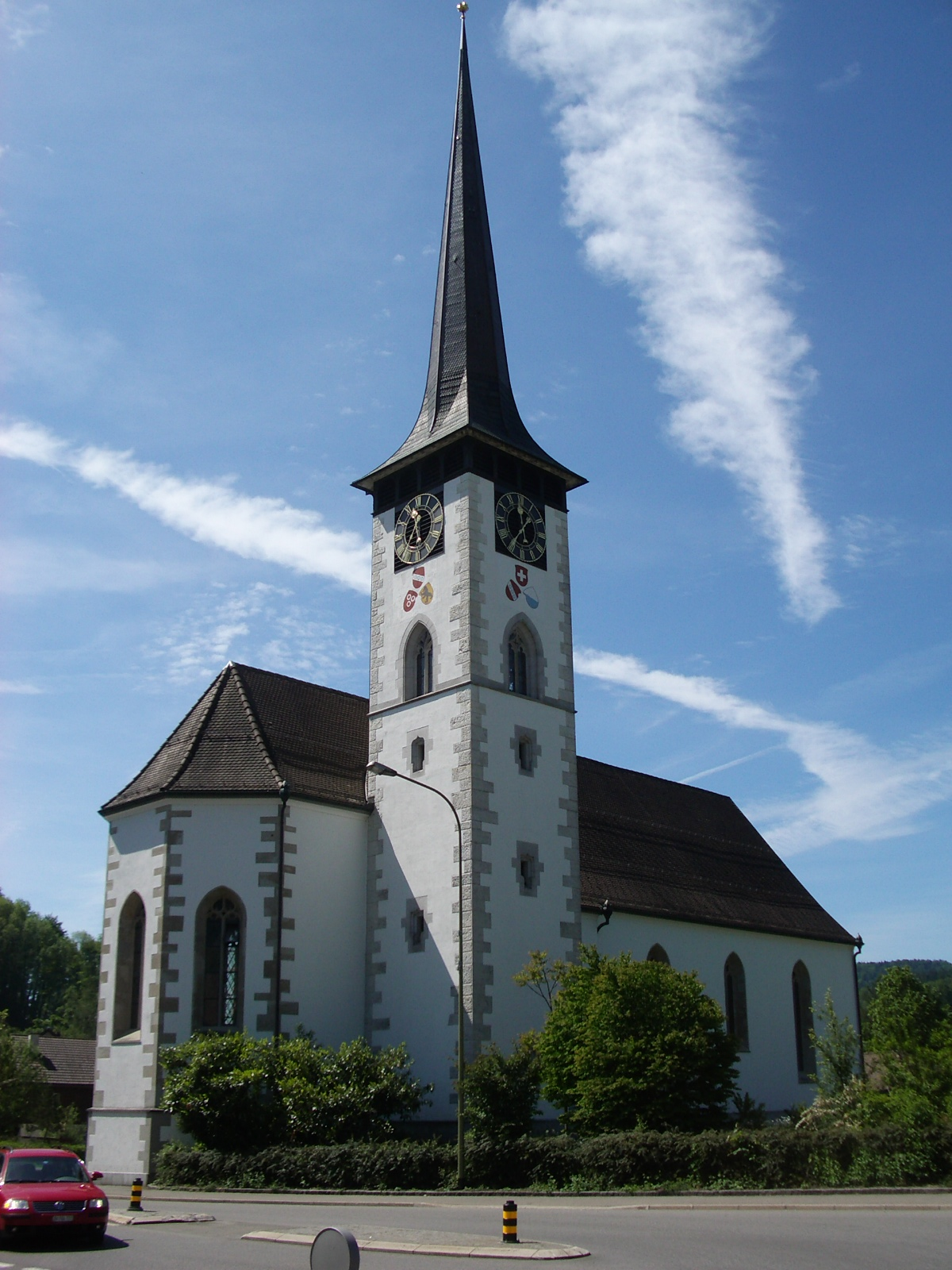
Protestant church

Aerial view from 300 m by Walter Mittelholzer (1920)

Turbenthal has an area of 25.2 km^{2} (9.7 sq mi). Of this area, 34.7% is used for agricultural purposes, while 57.6% is forested. Of the rest of the land, 7.1% is settled (buildings or roads) and the remainder (0.6%) is non-productive (rivers, glaciers or mountains). In 1996 housing and buildings made up 4.3% of the total area, while transportation infrastructure made up the rest (2.8%). Of the total unproductive area, water (streams and lakes) made up 0.3% of the area. As of 2007, 4.8% of the total municipal area was undergoing some type of construction.

Turbenthal is situated in the upper Töss Valley.

== Demographics ==
Turbenthal has a population (as of 31 December 2020) of 4,983. As of 2007, 16.2% of the population was made up of foreign nationals. As of 2008 the gender distribution of the population was 50.2% male and 49.8% female. Over the last 10 years the population has grown at a rate of 0.3%. Most of the population (as of 2000) speaks German (88.1%), with Italian being second most common ( 3.8%) and Albanian being third ( 1.8%).

In the 2007 election the most popular party was the SVP which received 43.4% of the vote. The next three most popular parties were the SPS (18.3%), the CSP (13.5%) and the Green Party (10.8%).

The age distribution of the population (as of 2000) is children and teenagers (0–19 years old) make up 28.6% of the population, while adults (20–64 years old) make up 59.1% and seniors (over 64 years old) make up 12.3%. In Turbenthal about 69.6% of the population (between age 25–64) have completed either non-mandatory upper secondary education or additional higher education (either university or a Fachhochschule). There are 1540 households in Turbenthal.

Turbenthal has an unemployment rate of 2.39%. As of 2005, there were 150 people employed in the primary economic sector and about 59 businesses involved in this sector. 368 people are employed in the secondary sector and there are 49 businesses in this sector. 834 people are employed in the tertiary sector, with 133 businesses in this sector. As of 2007 39.6% of the working population were employed full-time, and 60.4% were employed part-time.

As of 2008 there were 840 Catholics and 2031 Protestants in Turbenthal. In the 2000 census, religion was broken down into several smaller categories. From the census, 54.1% were some type of Protestant, with 50.3% belonging to the Swiss Reformed Church and 3.7% belonging to other Protestant churches. 23.3% of the population were Catholic. Of the rest of the population, 0% were Muslim, 7.8% belonged to another religion (not listed), 4.1% did not give a religion, and 9.6% were atheist or agnostic.

== Transportation ==
Turbenthal railway station is a stop on the Zurich S-Bahn service S26.

== Economy ==
Turbental is the home of Schlossberg Textil AG, a manufacturer of bed linen.
