= Schlatt bei Winterthur =

- Municipality
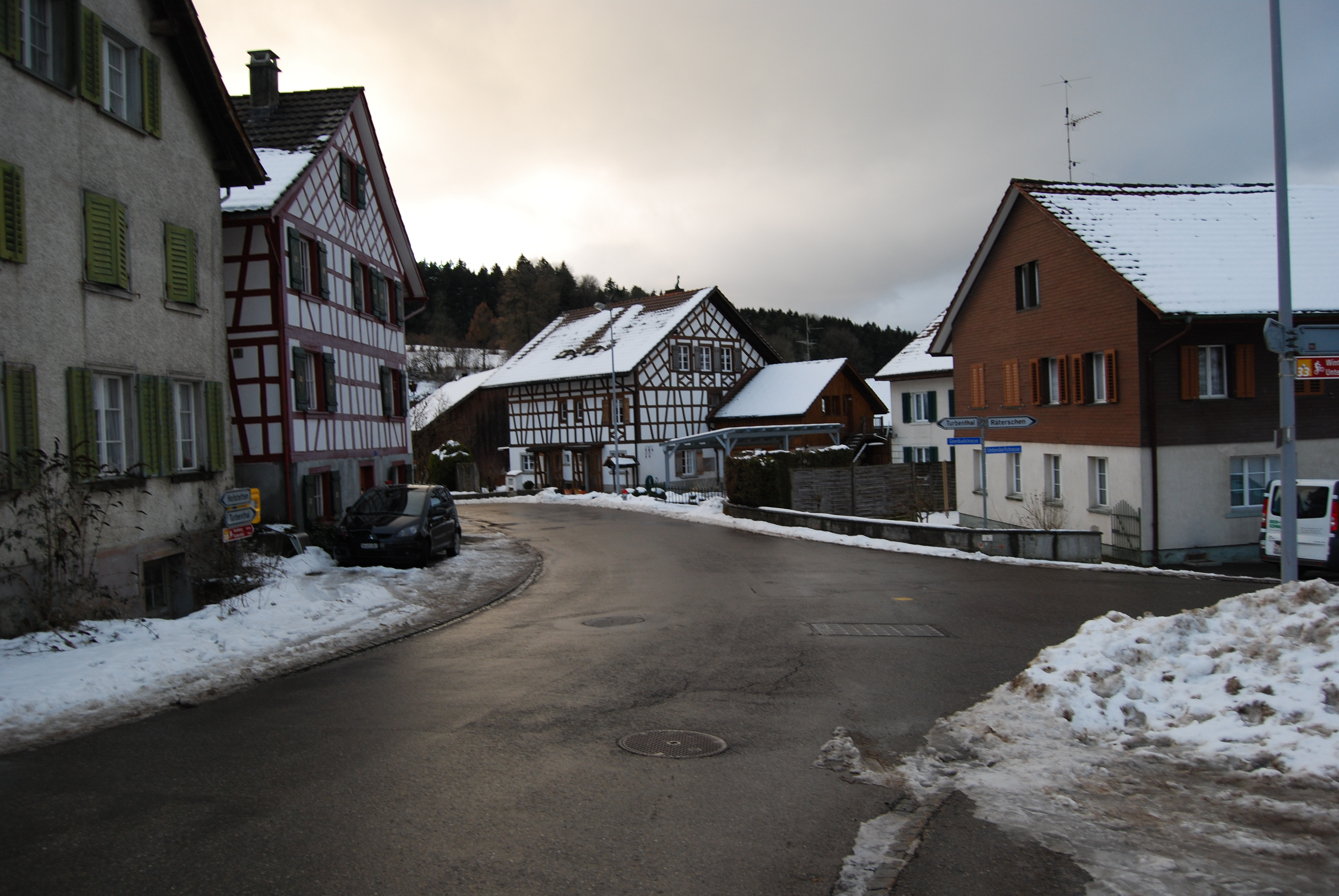

- Flag Coat of arms
- Location of Schlatt bei Winterthur
- Location within Switzerland Location within Canton of Zurich
- Coordinates: 47°28′N 8°50′E
- Country: Switzerland
- Canton: Zurich
- District: Winterthur

Area
  - Total: 9.03 km^{2} (3.49 sq mi)
- Elevation: 656 m (2,152 ft)

Population (December 2020)
  - Total: 779
  - Density: 86.3/km^{2} (223/sq mi)
- Time zone: UTC+01:00 (CET)
  - Summer (DST): UTC+02:00 (CEST)
- Postal code: 8418
- SFOS number: 226
- ISO 3166 code: CH-ZH
- Surrounded by: Elsau, Hofstetten bei Elgg, Turbenthal, Winterthur, Zell
- Website: www.schlatt-zh.ch

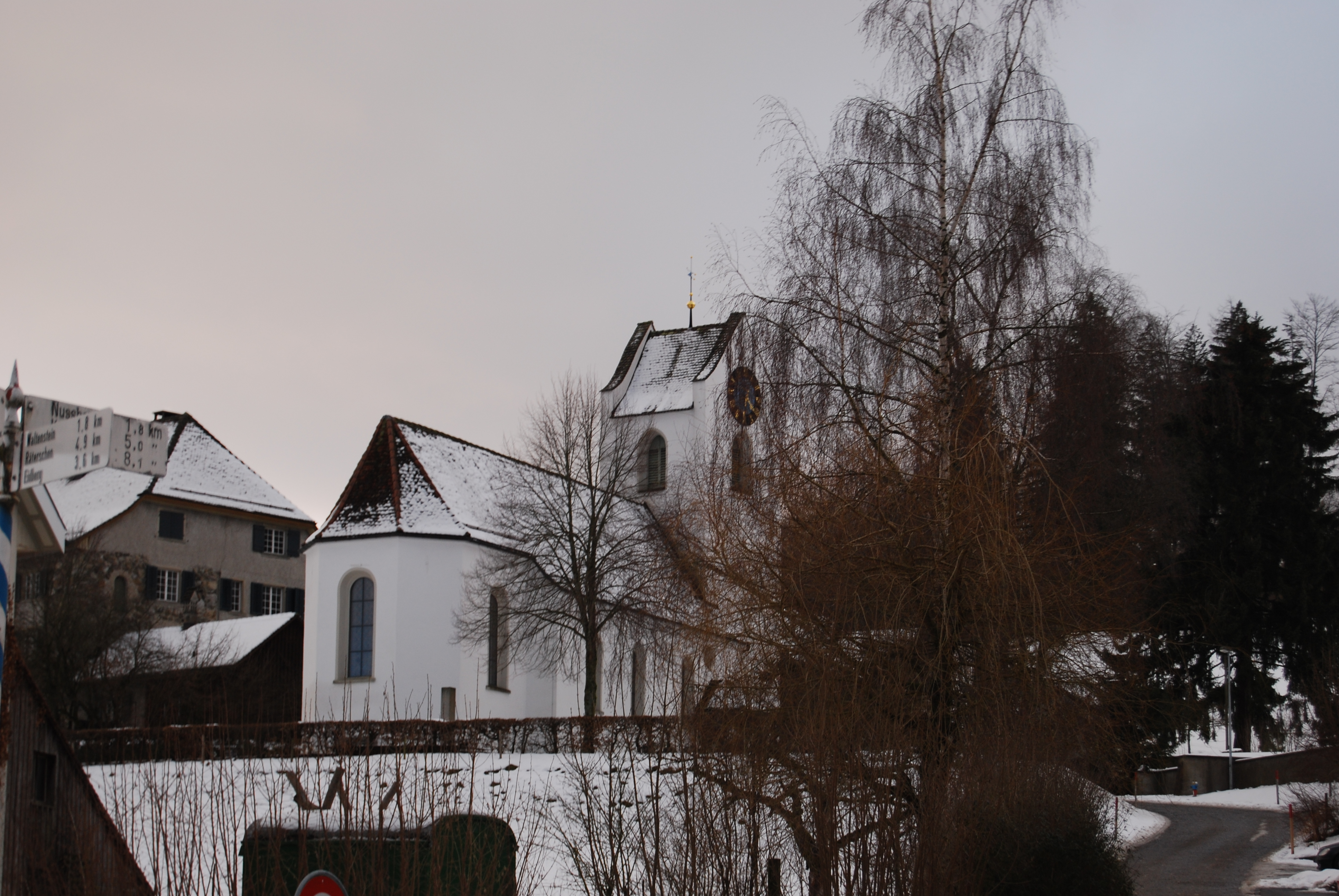
Church of Schlatt

Schlatt bei Winterthur is a municipality in the district of Winterthur in the canton of Zürich in Switzerland.

== Geography ==
Schlatt has an area of 9.1 km^{2} (3.5 sq mi). Of this area, 47.9% is used for agricultural purposes, while 45.5% is forested. Of the rest of the land, 5.6% is settled (buildings or roads) and the remainder (1%) is non-productive (rivers, glaciers or mountains). In 1996 housing and buildings made up 2.8% of the total area, while transportation infrastructure made up the rest (2.9%). Of the total unproductive area, water (streams and lakes) made up 0.6% of the area. As of 2007, 3% of the total municipal area was undergoing some type of construction.

Aerial view from 400 m by Walter Mittelholzer (1923)

== Demographics ==
Schlatt has a population (as of 31 December 2020) of 779. As of 2007, 5.3% of the population was made up of foreign nationals. As of 2008 the gender distribution of the population was 51.4% male and 48.6% female. Over the last 10 years the population has grown at a rate of 12.6%. Most of the population (as of 2000) speaks German (96.4%), with Italian being second most common ( 1.0%) and Dutch being third ( 1.0%).

In the 2007 election the most popular party was the SVP which received 49.6% of the vote. The next three most popular parties were the CSP (12.5%), the SPS (11.4%) and the Green Party (11%).

The age distribution of the population (as of 2000) is children and teenagers (0–19 years old) make up 27.4% of the population, while adults (20–64 years old) make up 59.8% and seniors (over 64 years old) make up 12.8%. In Schlatt about 85.3% of the population (between age 25–64) have completed either non-mandatory upper secondary education or additional higher education (either university or a Fachhochschule). There are 224 households in Schlatt.

Schlatt has an unemployment rate of 1.34%. As of 2005, there were 69 people employed in the primary economic sector and about 28 businesses involved in this sector. 36 people are employed in the secondary sector and there are 8 businesses in this sector. 48 people are employed in the tertiary sector, with 13 businesses in this sector. As of 2007 46% of the working population were employed full-time, and 54% were employed part-time.

As of 2008 there were 94 Catholics and 440 Protestants in Schlatt. In the 2000 census, religion was broken down into several smaller categories. From the census, 74.9% were some type of Protestant, with 66.6% belonging to the Swiss Reformed Church and 8.4% belonging to other Protestant churches. 12.3% of the population were Catholic. Of the rest of the population, 0% were Muslim, 0.8% belonged to another religion (not listed), 1.1% did not give a religion, and 10.2% were atheist or agnostic.
