= S11 (ZVV) =

Railway service in Switzerland

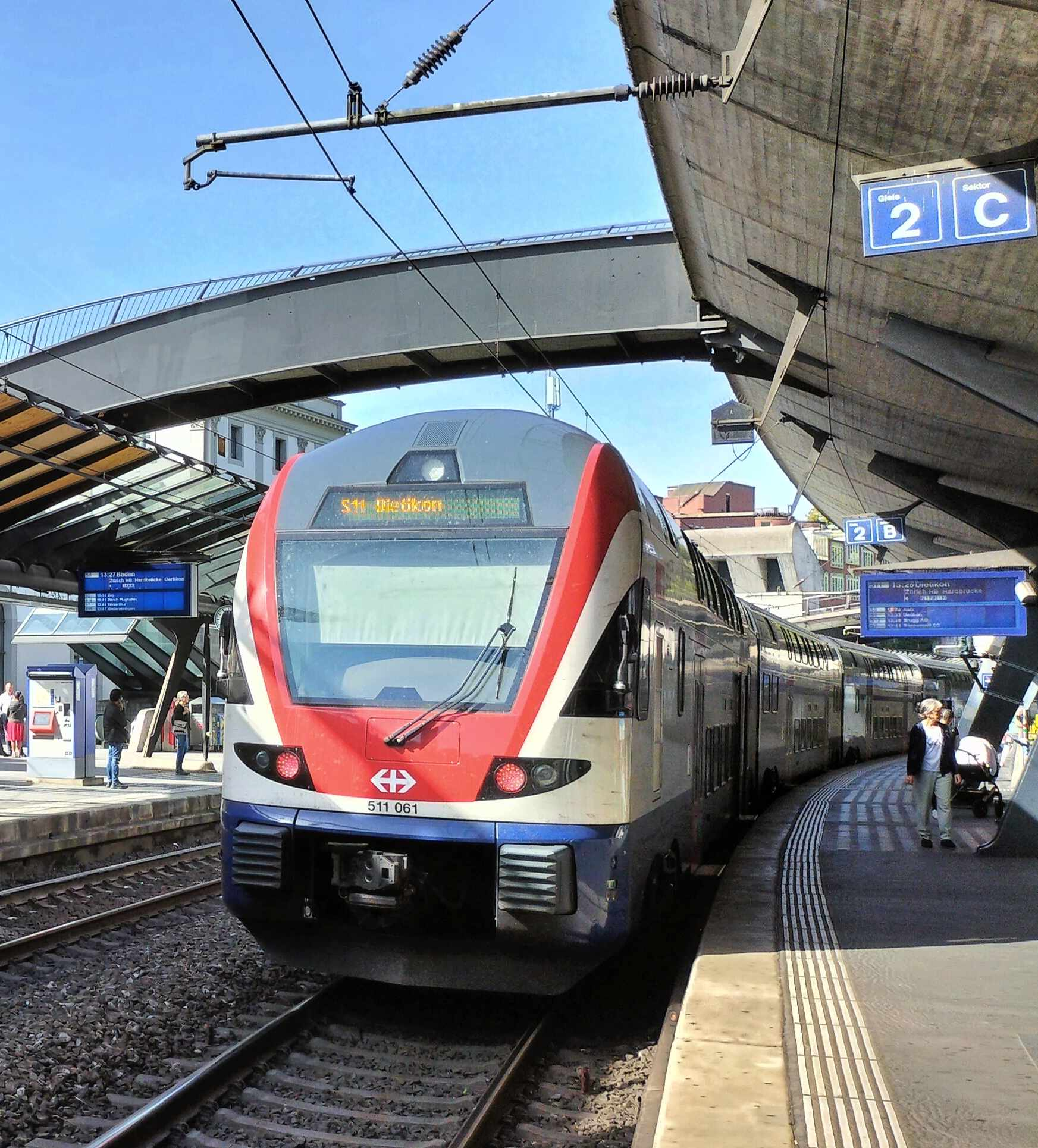
- An S11 train at Zürich Stadelhofen station in 2023.

Overview
- Status: Operational
- Locale: Zürich, Switzerland
- Termini: Seuzach / Sennhof-Kyburg / Wila; Aarau
- Website: ZVV (in English)

Service
- Type: S-Bahn
- System: Zürich S-Bahn
- Operator(s): Zürcher Verkehrsverbund (ZVV)
- Rolling stock: RABe 511

History
- Opened: December 2018

Technical
- Track gauge: 1,435 mm (4 ft 8 1/2 in) standard gauge

Zürich S-Bahn network as of December 2018

The S11 is a regional railway line of the S-Bahn Zürich on the Zürcher Verkehrsverbund (ZVV), Zürich transportation network. The S11 is one of the network's lines connecting the cantons of Zürich and Aargau.

At Zürich HB, trains of the S11 service usually depart from underground tracks (Gleis) 41–44 (Museumstrasse station).

== Route ==
- S11 Aarau–Lenzburg–Dietikon–Zürich HB–Zürich Stettbach–Winterthur–Seuzach/Sennhof-Kyburg (–Wila)
  Operates non stop between Stettbach and Winterthur; the lines to Seuzach and Sennhof-Kyburg are operated alternately at hourly intervals; supplementary trains to Wila.

Line S11 commences at Aarau station, in the canton of Aargau. It follows the Heitersberg line as far as Killwangen-Spreitenbach station, and then the Baden to Zürich line as far as Dietikon station and the approaches to Zürich Hauptbahnhof station. Passing through the lower level platforms at this station, the line then passes through the Hirschengraben and Zürichberg tunnels, and Stettbach station, before joining the Zürich to Winterthur line. The S11 follows this line as far as Winterthur Hauptbahnhof station, running non-stop between Stettbach and Winterthur. From Winterthur it runs either over the Tösstalbahn as far as Sennhof-Kyburg, or over the Winterthur to Etzwilen line as far as Seuzach. During rush hour, trains are extended from Sennhof-Kyburg to Wila.

Trains on the S11 usually run every 30 minutes, with a journey time of around 50 to 92 minutes. The alternation of trains to Sennhof-Kyburg and Seuzach provides an hourly service to each terminus.

== Stations ==
The following stations are served by the S11.

=== Stations served by all S11 trains ===
- Aarau
- Lenzburg
- Othmarsingen
- Mägenwil
- Mellingen Heitersberg
- Killwangen-Spreitenbach
- Dietikon
- Glanzenberg
- Schlieren
- Zürich Altstetten
- Zürich Hardbrücke
- Zürich Hauptbahnhof
- Zürich Stadelhofen
- Stettbach
- Winterthur Hauptbahnhof

=== Stations served by trains on the S11 Seuzach branch ===
- Winterthur Hauptbahnhof
- Oberwinterthur
- Winterthur Wallrüti
- Reutlingen
- Seuzach

=== Stations served by trains on the S11 Sennhof-Kyburg / Wila branch ===
- Winterthur Hauptbahnhof
- Winterthur Grüze
- Winterthur Seen
- Sennhof-Kyburg
- Kollbrunn
- Rikon
- Rämismühle-Zell
- Turbenthal
- Wila

== Rolling stock ==
As of the December 2022 timetable change, all services are operated with RABe 511 class trains.

== History ==
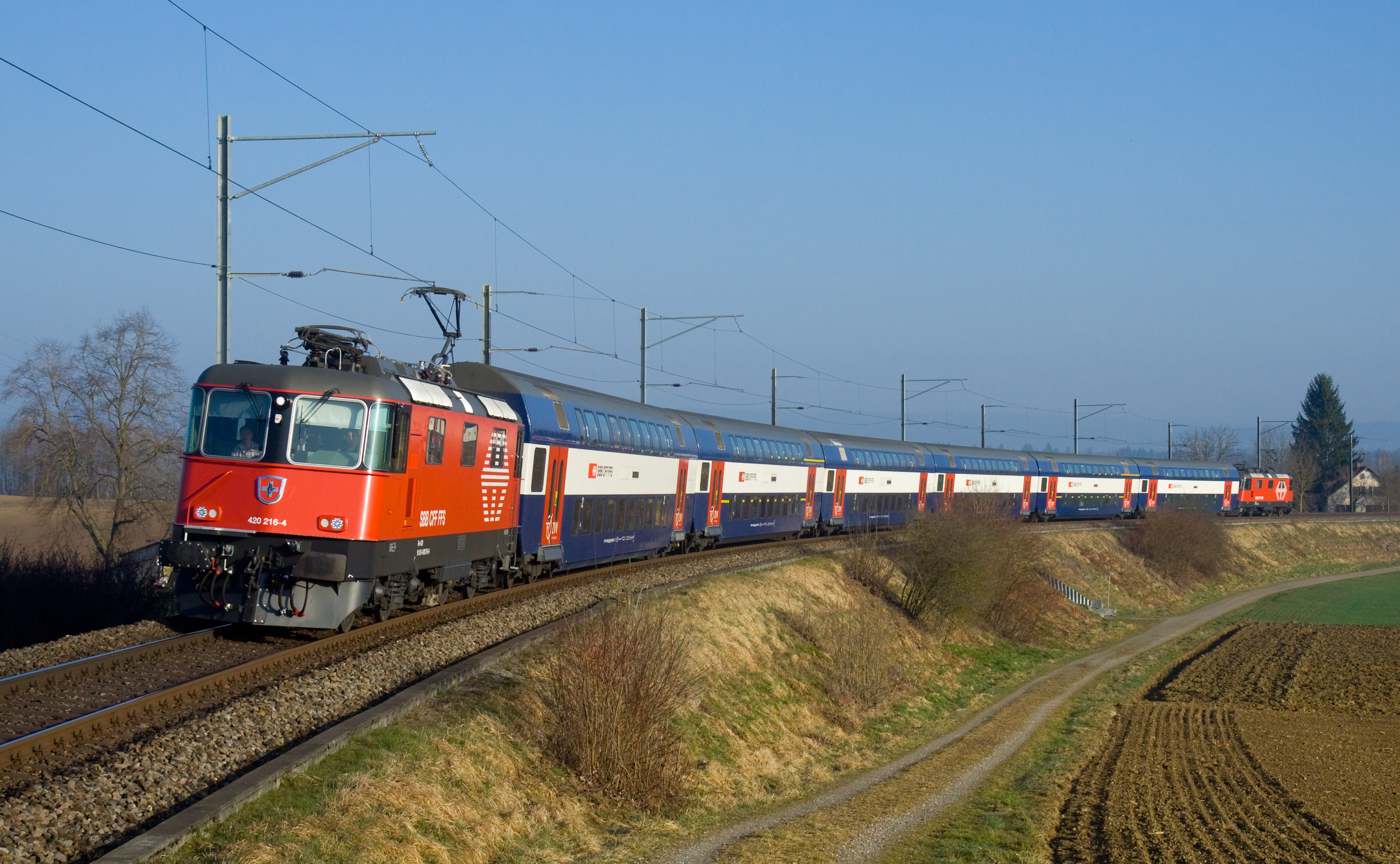
A former S11 rush-hour only service passing through Andelfingen in 2012

Until the introduction of the S11 as a regular service with the December 2018 timetable change, there used to be a peak-hour only service between Zürich and Schaffhausen via Winterthur designated as S11. Refurbished Re 420 (LION) locomotives push-pulling double-decker coaches were used at that time. The route from Winterthur to Winterthur Seen and Seuzach, respectively, was operated by the former S12 until December 2018.

Prior to the December 2023 timetable change, off-peak S11 trains ran only hourly between Dietikon and Aarau because of capacity constraints on the Heitersberg railway line. Improvements to that line permitted regular half-hourly service over that part of the route.

== See also ==
- Rail transport in Switzerland
- List of railway stations in Zurich
- Public transport in Zurich
- ZVV fare zones
- A-Welle tariff network (Aargau)
