= Wila railway station =

Railway station in Canton of Zürich, Switzerland

Wila
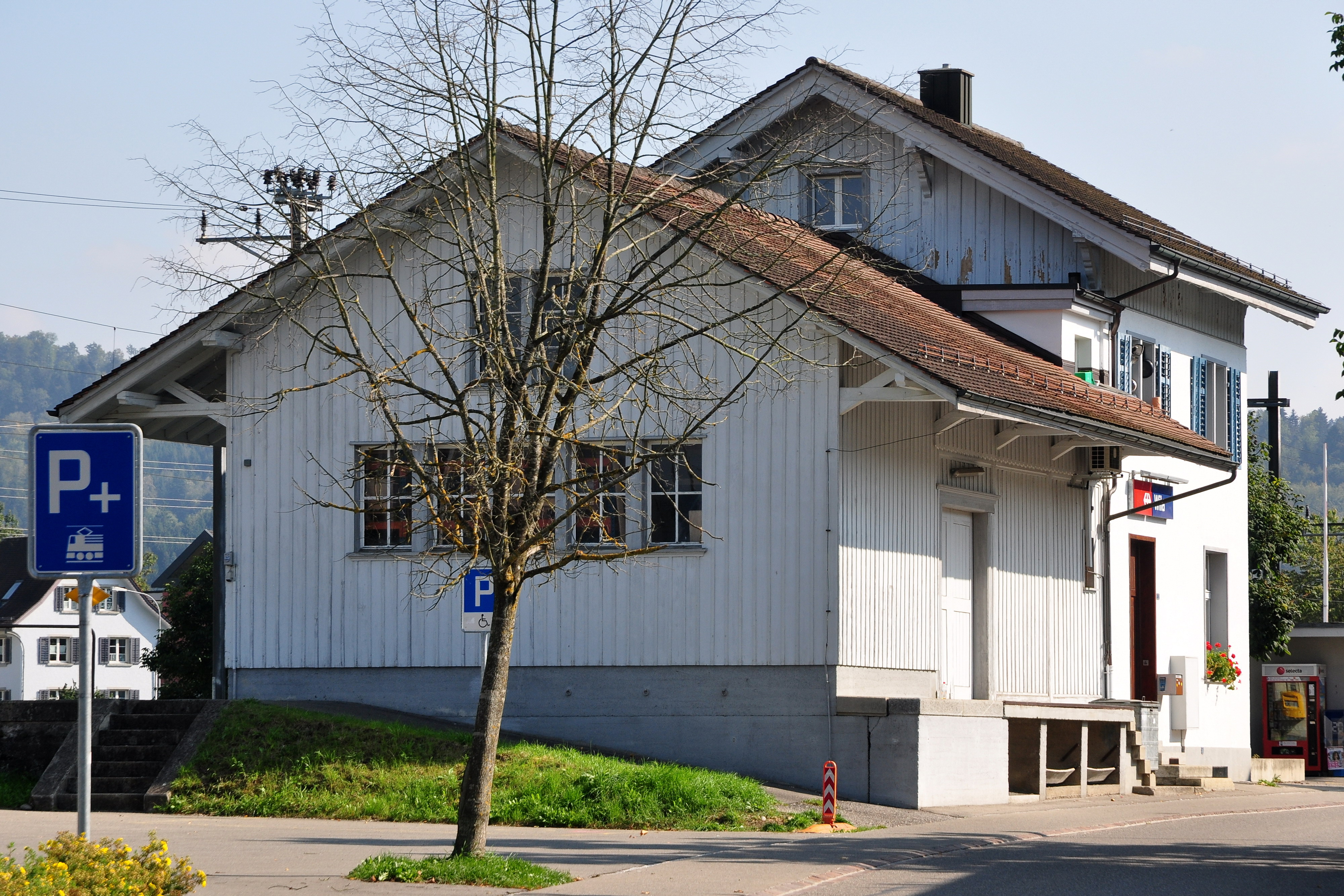
- The station building in 2011

General information
- Location: Bahnhofplatz, Wila, Canton of Zurich, Switzerland
- Coordinates: 47.417812°N 8.848693°E
- Elevation: 569 m (1,867 ft)
- Owner: Swiss Federal Railways
- Operator: Swiss Federal Railways; Thurbo
- Line: Tösstalbahn
- Platforms: 2 side platforms
- Tracks: 2
- Connections
- Bus: PostAuto bus routes 807 833

Other information
- Fare zone: 171 (ZVV)

Services
Preceding station	Zurich S-Bahn	Following station
Turbenthal towards Aarau	S11	Terminus
Turbenthal towards Winterthur	S26	Saland towards Rüti ZH
Location
- Location within Switzerland Location within Canton of Zurich

Wila railway station is a railway station in the Swiss canton of Zurich and municipality of Wila. The station is located on the Töss Valley railway line (Tösstalbahn) between Winterthur and Rüti ZH, within fare zone 171 of the Zürcher Verkehrsverbund (ZVV).

== Service ==
The station is served by Zurich S-Bahn lines S11 (peak-hour only) and S26.

- Zurich S-Bahn
  - S11: hourly service (peak-hour only) to Aarau via Zürich HB
  - S26: half-hourly service between Winterthur and Rüti ZH

== See also ==
- Rail transport in Switzerland
