= Winterthur railway station (disambiguation) =

Winterthur railway station is the main railway station (formerly known as Hauptbahnhof Winterthur) in the Swiss city of Winterthur.

It may erroneously also refer to one of a number of smaller railway stations:

- Oberwinterthur railway station
- Reutlingen railway station
- Sennhof-Kyburg railway station
- Winterthur Grüze railway station
- Winterthur Hegi railway station in Hegi
- Winterthur Seen railway station
- Winterthur Töss railway station
- Winterthur Wallrüti railway station
- Winterthur Wülflingen railway station
