= Winterthur Seen railway station =

Railway station

Winterthur Seen
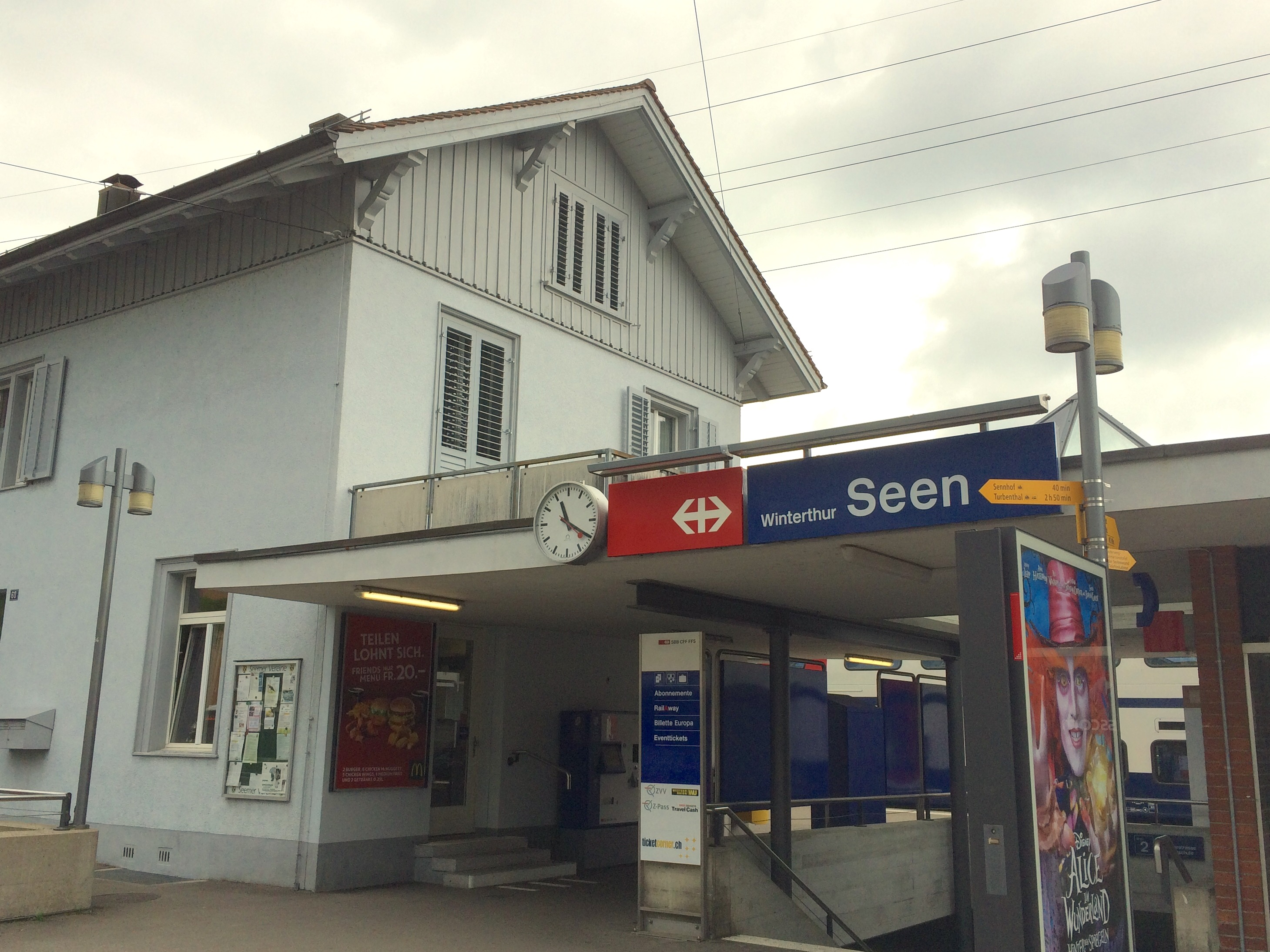

General information
- Location: Kanzleistrasse 60; 8405 Winterthur; Winterthur, Zürich; Switzerland
- Coordinates: 47°29′15″N 8°46′00″E
- Elevation: 468 m (1,535 ft)
- Owner: Swiss Federal Railways
- Operator: Swiss Federal Railways; Thurbo
- Lines: Tösstalbahn; Winterthur–Wil
- Platforms: 2 side platforms
- Tracks: 2
- Connections: Stadtbus Winterthur bus routes 2 9

Other information
- Fare zone: 120 (ZVV)

History
- Opened: 4 May 1875

Services
Preceding station	Zurich S-Bahn	Following station
Winterthur Grüze towards Aarau	S11	Sennhof-Kyburg towards Wila
Winterthur Grüze towards Winterthur	S26	Sennhof-Kyburg towards Rüti ZH
Location
- Location within Switzerland Location within Canton of Zurich

Winterthur Seen railway station (German: Bahnhof Winterthur Seen) is a railway station that serves Seen, which is district 3 in the city of Winterthur, in the canton of Zurich, Switzerland. It forms part of the Töss Valley line section between Winterthur and Bauma. It is one of ten railway stations in the city of Winterthur (fare zone 120 of ZVV), the others being: Oberwinterthur, Reutlingen, Sennhof-Kyburg, Winterthur, Winterthur Grüze, Winterthur Hegi, Winterthur Töss, Winterthur Wallrüti, and Winterthur Wülflingen.

== Location and layout ==
Winterthur Seen railway station has two side platforms and two tracks (Gleis). The station building contains an Avec supermarket.

Situated at the north eastern edge of central Seen, the station borders the quarter of Sonnenberg, on the other side of the tracks.

== History ==
The station was opened on 4 May 1875, together with the rest of the first section of the Tösstalbahn, between Grüze and Bauma. One year later, the line was extended to Wald. From 1882, the operating railway company also had a line of its own to Winterthur Hauptbahnhof. On 10 June 1918, the station and the rest of the line were nationalized, and came under the control of Swiss Federal Railways.

== Services ==
=== S-Bahn ===
The station is served only by S-Bahn trains. It is an intermediate stop of two lines of the Zurich S-Bahn:

- S11 Aarau–Lenzburg–Dietikon–Zürich HB–Zürich Stettbach–Winterthur–Seuzach/Sennhof-Kyburg (–Wila)
  Operates non stop between Stettbach and Winterthur; the lines to Seuzach and Sennhof-Kyburg are operated alternately at hourly intervals; supplementary trains to Wila.
- S26 Winterthur–Bauma–Rüti ZH

== Local transport ==
de:Stadtbus Winterthur serves the station with one Winterthur trolleybus line and one motor bus line. The station is the terminus of both lines.

Line	Route
2	Wülflingen – Hauptbahnhof – Seen
9	Seen – Klösterli Iberg – Eidberg

In addition, line 3 (Rosenberg – Hauptbahnhof – Oberseen) has a bus stop called "Post Seen" about 200 m (660 ft) to the west of the station.

== See also ==
- History of rail transport in Switzerland
- Rail transport in Switzerland
