= Trolleybuses in Winterthur =

Trolleybus system in Switzerland

Winterthur trolleybus system
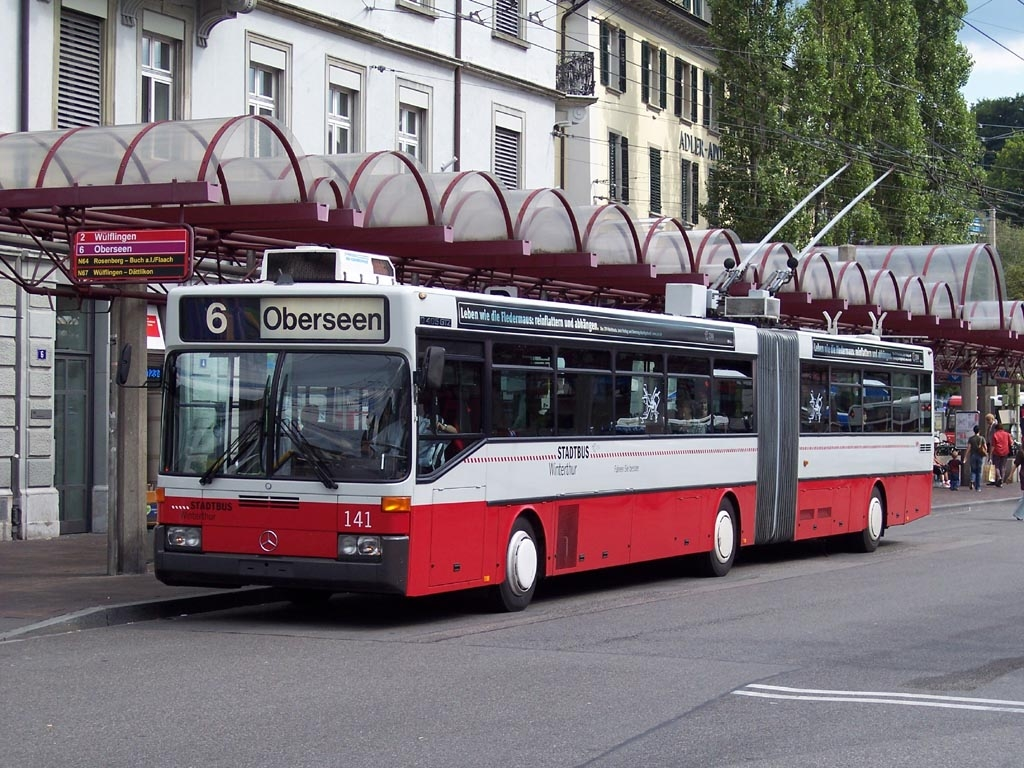
- A Mercedes-Benz O405 GTZ trolleybus at Winterthur Hauptbahnhof (main railway station).

Operation
- Locale: Winterthur, Switzerland
- Open: 1938
- Status: Open
- Lines: 5
- Operator: Stadtbus Winterthur

Statistics
Overview
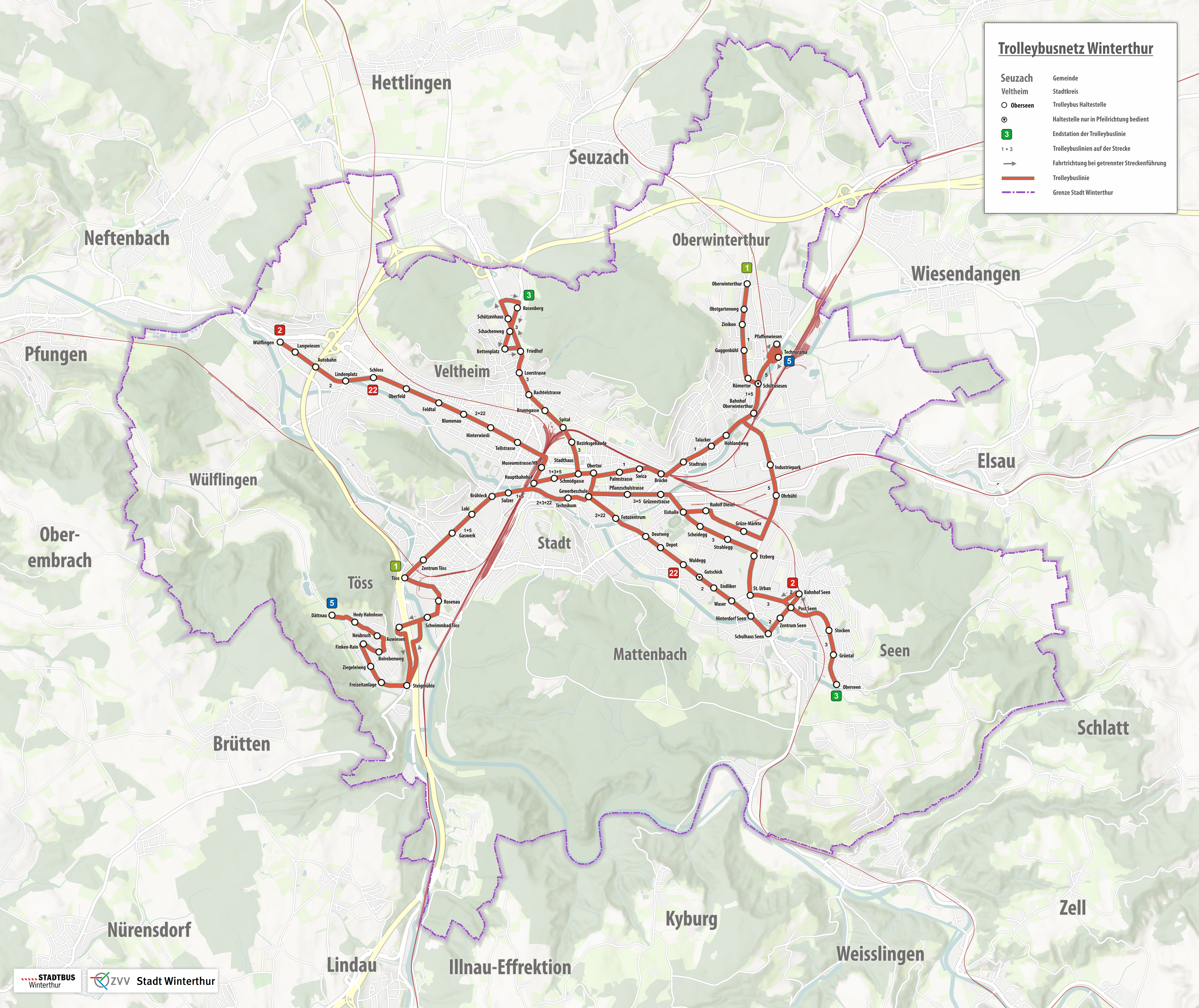
- Website: http://www.stadtbus-winterthur.ch Stadtbus Winterthur (in German)

The Winterthur trolleybus system (Alemannic German: Trolleybus System Winterthur) forms part of the public transport network that serves Winterthur, in the canton of Zürich, Switzerland.

Opened on 28 December 1938, the system gradually replaced the Winterthur tramway network.

== History ==
The individual line sections of the Winterthur trolleybus system went into operation as follows:

28 December 1938	Hauptbahnhof–Wülflingen Lindenplatz (3.1 km)	Line 2	Tram replacement
24 July 1941	Hauptbahnhof–Seen (4.2 km)	Line 2	Tram replacement
26 April 1948	Hauptbahnhof–Rosenberg	Line 3	Bus replacement
6 October 1951	Hauptbahnhof–Oberwinterthur Bahnhof (2.9 km)	Line 1	Tram replacement
3 November 1951	Hauptbahnhof–Zentrum Töss (1.8 km)	Line 1	Tram replacement
4 October 1960	Wülflingen Lindenplatz–Wülflingen	Line 2	New connection
4 October 1960	Hauptbahnhof–Breite–Hauptbahnhof	Line 3	Bus replacement
2 June 1965	Zentrum Töss–Töss	Line 1	New connection
16 June 1982	Oberwinterthur Bahnhof–Oberwinterthur	Line 1	New connection
26 October 1991	Hauptbahnhof–Oberseen	Line 6	Bus replacement
6 April 2011	Friedhof / Schachenweg–Rosenberg	Line 3	New connection
15 December 2024	Rosenau – Töss	Line 5	New connection
15 December 2024	Hauptbahnhof, Zürcherstrasse – Hauptpost	Line 5	Gap closure
15 December 2024	Eishalle – Ohrbühl	Line 5	New connection

With the timetable change on 23 May 1982, the Rosenberg line (line 3) was separated from the Breite line (a new line 4). The latter line, which operated as a circle line, was converted back into a diesel bus service on 28 May 1995, and the last remaining traces of its overhead wires disappeared at the end of January 2010.

Meanwhile, in December 2006, lines 3 and 6 were merged into the present line 3.

With the timetable change on 15 Dezember 2024 Line 5 was fully electrified with IMC-Trolleybuses.

== Lines ==
The present system is made up of the following lines:

1	Töss–Hauptbahnhof–Oberwinterthur	During rush hour with 7.5-minute headways, using 10 trolleybuses.
2	Wülflingen–Hauptbahnhof–Seen	During rush hour with 7.5-minute headways, using 11 trolleybuses.
22	Schloss–Hauptbahnhof–Waldegg	During rush hour with 7.5-minute headways, using 6 trolleybuses.
3	Rosenberg–Hauptbahnhof–Oberseen	During rush hour with 7.5-minute headways, using 10 trolleybuses.
5	Dättnau–HB–Technorama	During rush hour with 15-minute headways, using 7 trolleybuses.

== Fleet ==
=== Evolution ===
The Winterthur trolleybus system was operated initially by conventional length, two-axle vehicles. In 1957, the first five articulated trolleybuses were ordered. They entered service in 1959.

In 1997, Stadtbus Winterthur sold a few trolleybuses to the Romanian city of Timișoara. Other trolleybuses were sold in 1998 to the Bulgarian city of Ruse, and, a year later, to Burgas, also in Bulgaria.

In March 2004, an order for 10 articulated trolleybuses was placed with Solaris Bus & Coach. In November 2005, the first trolleybus in this order was delivered. By the end of 2005, all had entered service; they replaced the Saurer trolleybuses nos. 122–131.

=== Current fleet ===
Numbers	Quantity	Manufacturer	Electrical equipment	Model	Low-floor	Year built
101–124	24	Hess	Kiepe	BGT-N2C	yes	2010–2013
171–180	10	Solaris	Cegelec	Trollino 18	yes	2004 / 2005

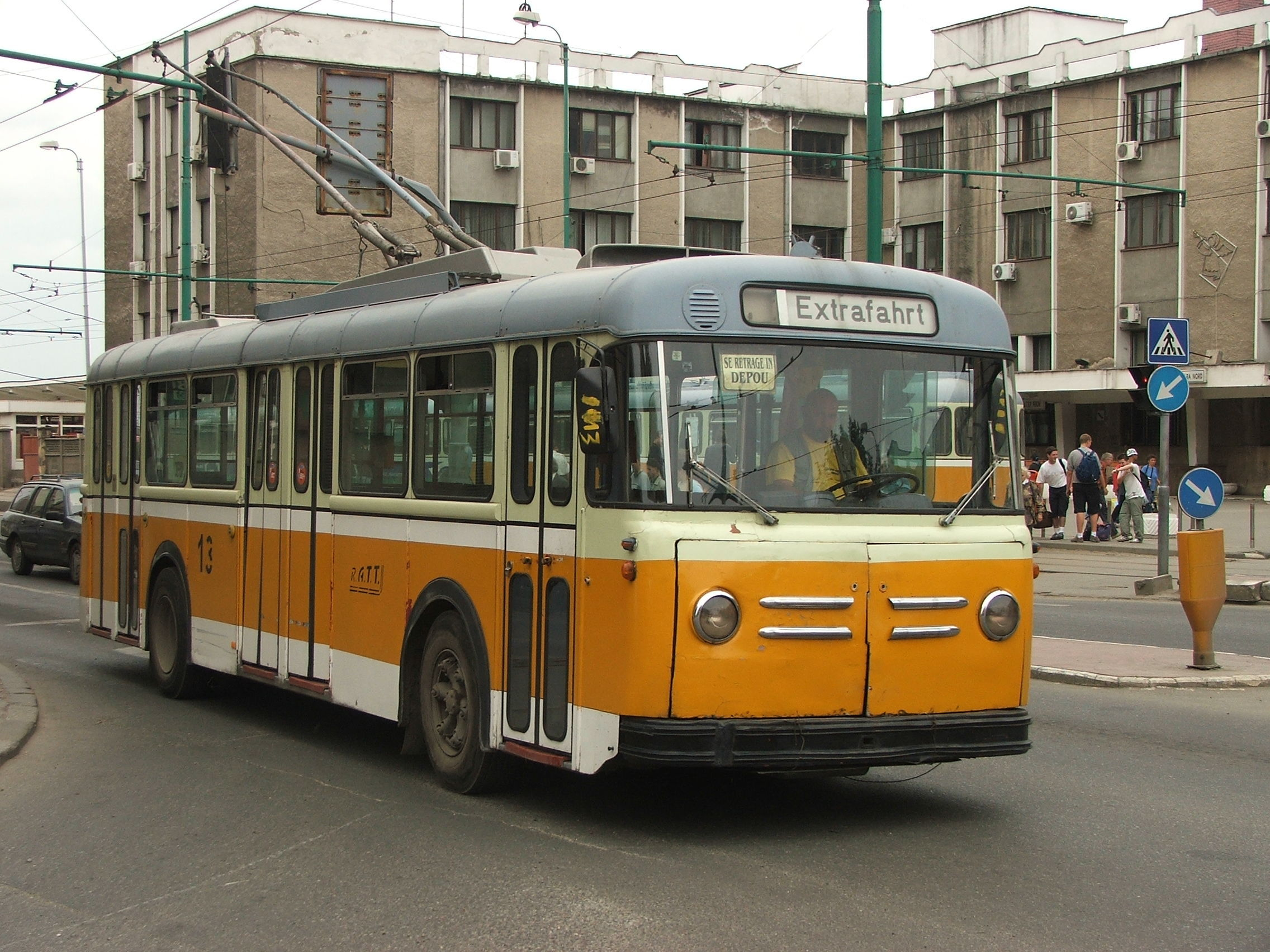
The former Winterthur Saurer trolleybus 13 from 1960, here in 2005 in Timișoara, Romania.

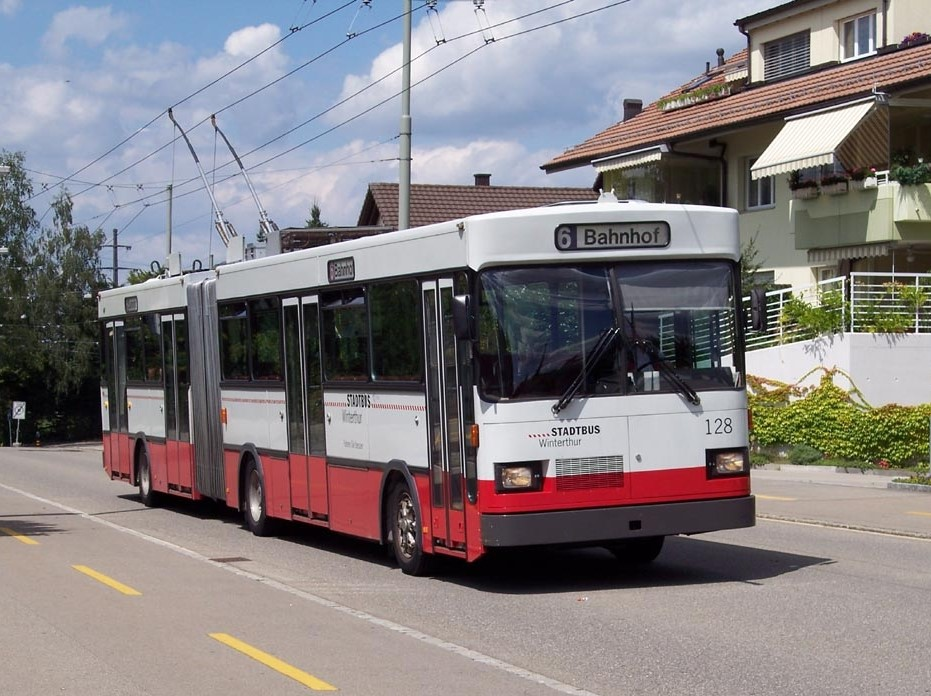
Saurer articulated trolleybus 128 from 1982 (since withdrawn), in Oberseen, 2005.

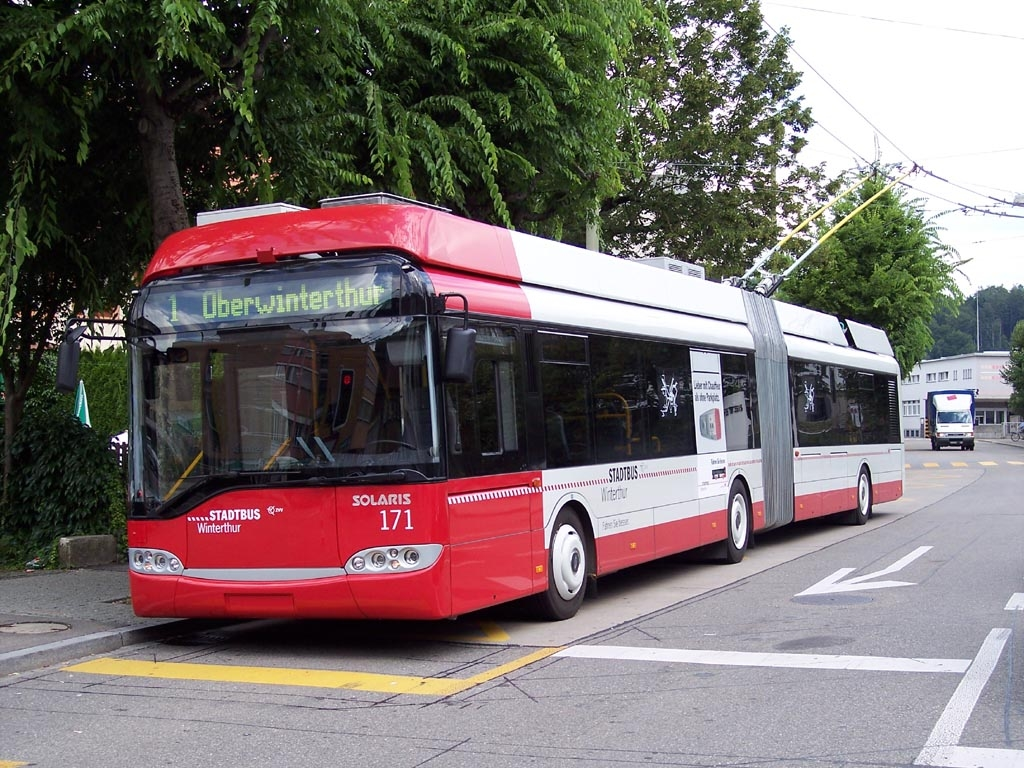
A Solaris Trollino 18 articulated trolleybus in Töss.

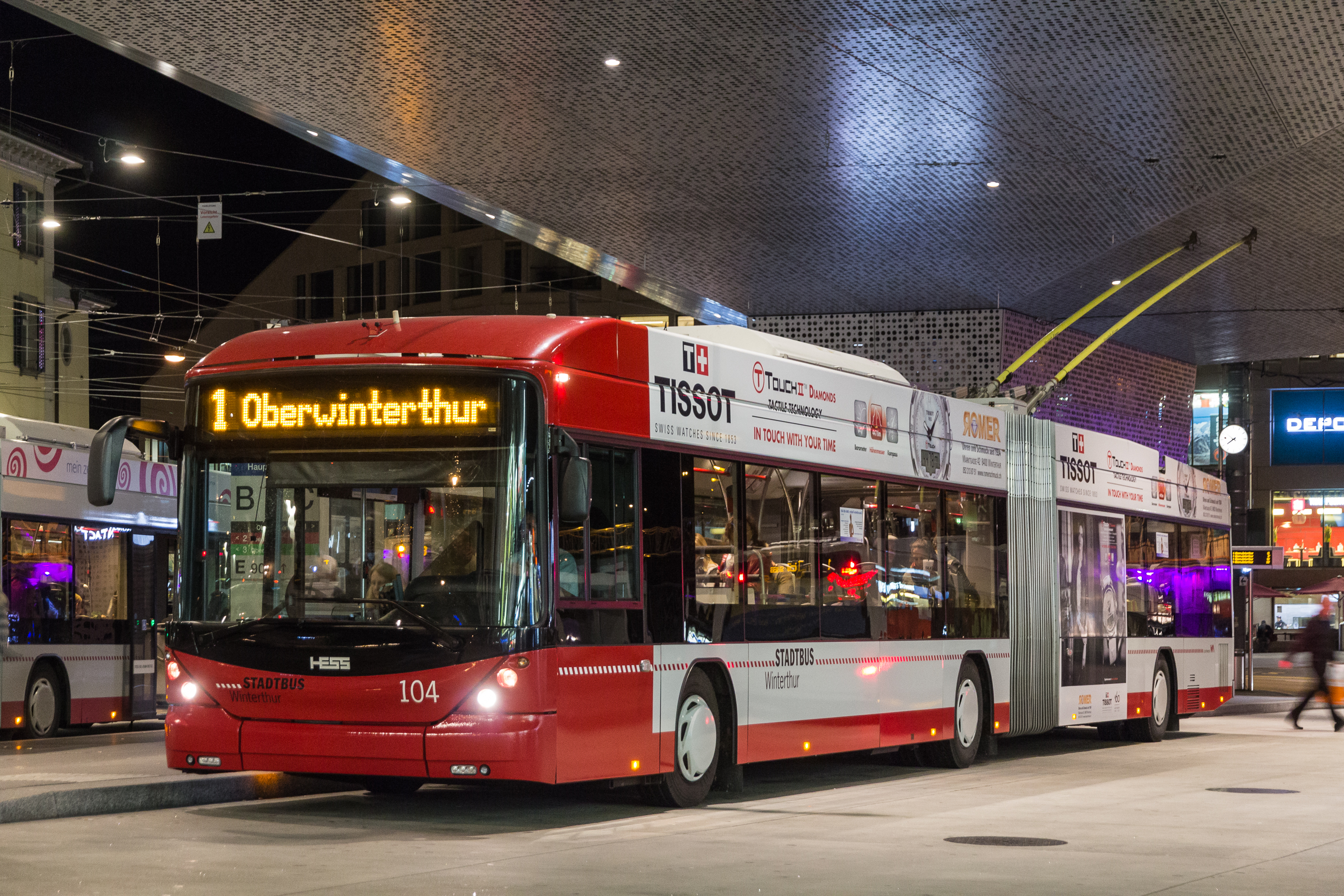
Hess SwissTrolley 3f at central (bus) station, 2014

== See also ==
- List of trolleybus systems in Switzerland
