= Reutlingen (Winterthur) =

Coordinates: 47°31′41″N 8°45′5″E

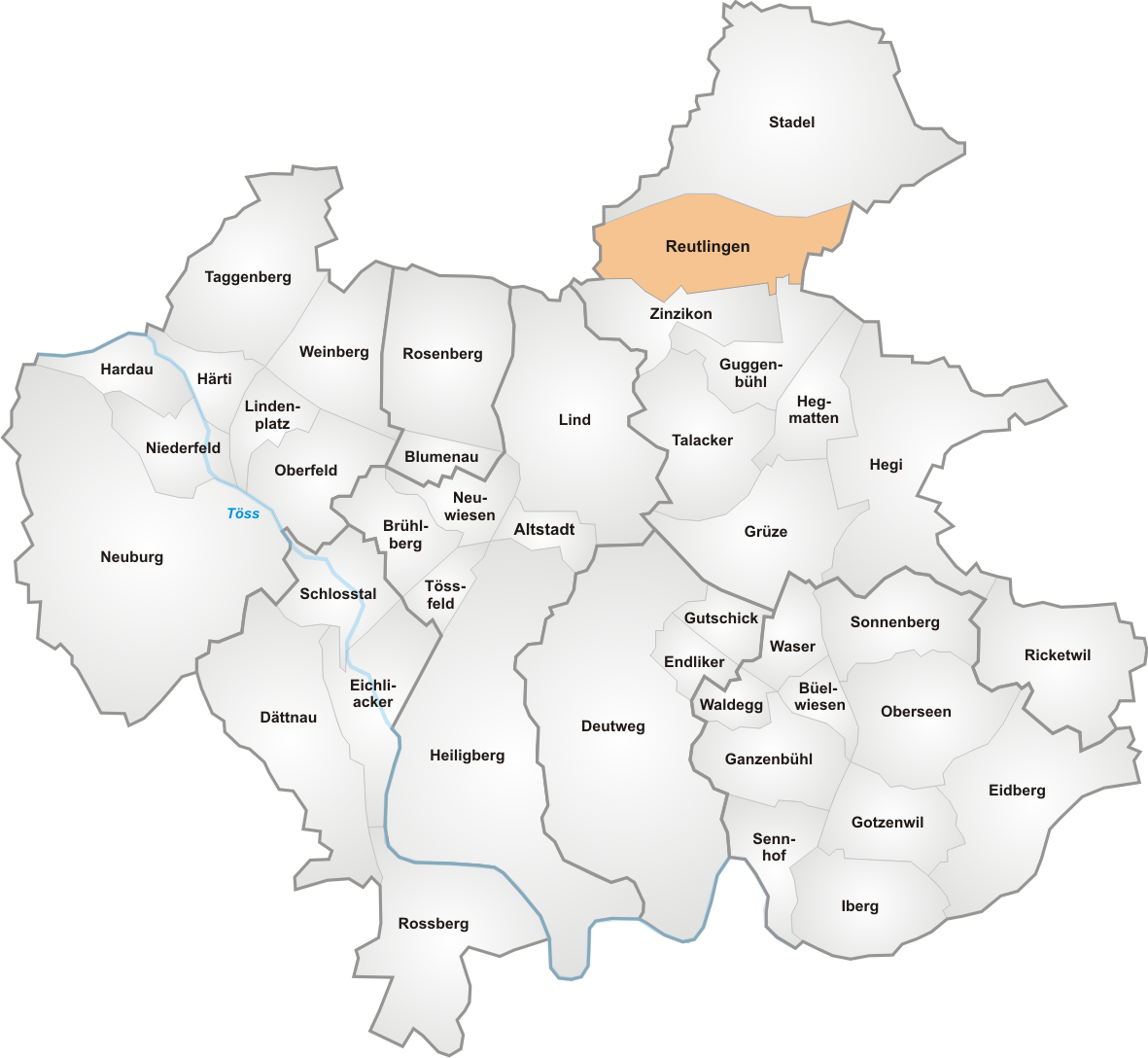
The quarter of Reutlingen in Winterthur.

Reutlingen is a quarter (neighborhood) in the district 2 (Oberwinterthur) of Winterthur.

It was formerly a part of Oberwinterthur municipality, which was incorporated into Winterthur in 1922.

Reutlingen railway station on the Winterthur–Etzwilen railway line is an intermediate stop of the Zurich S-Bahn services S11 and S29.
