= Oberwinterthur =

Coordinates: 47.517°N 8.769°E

- District of the city of Winterthur
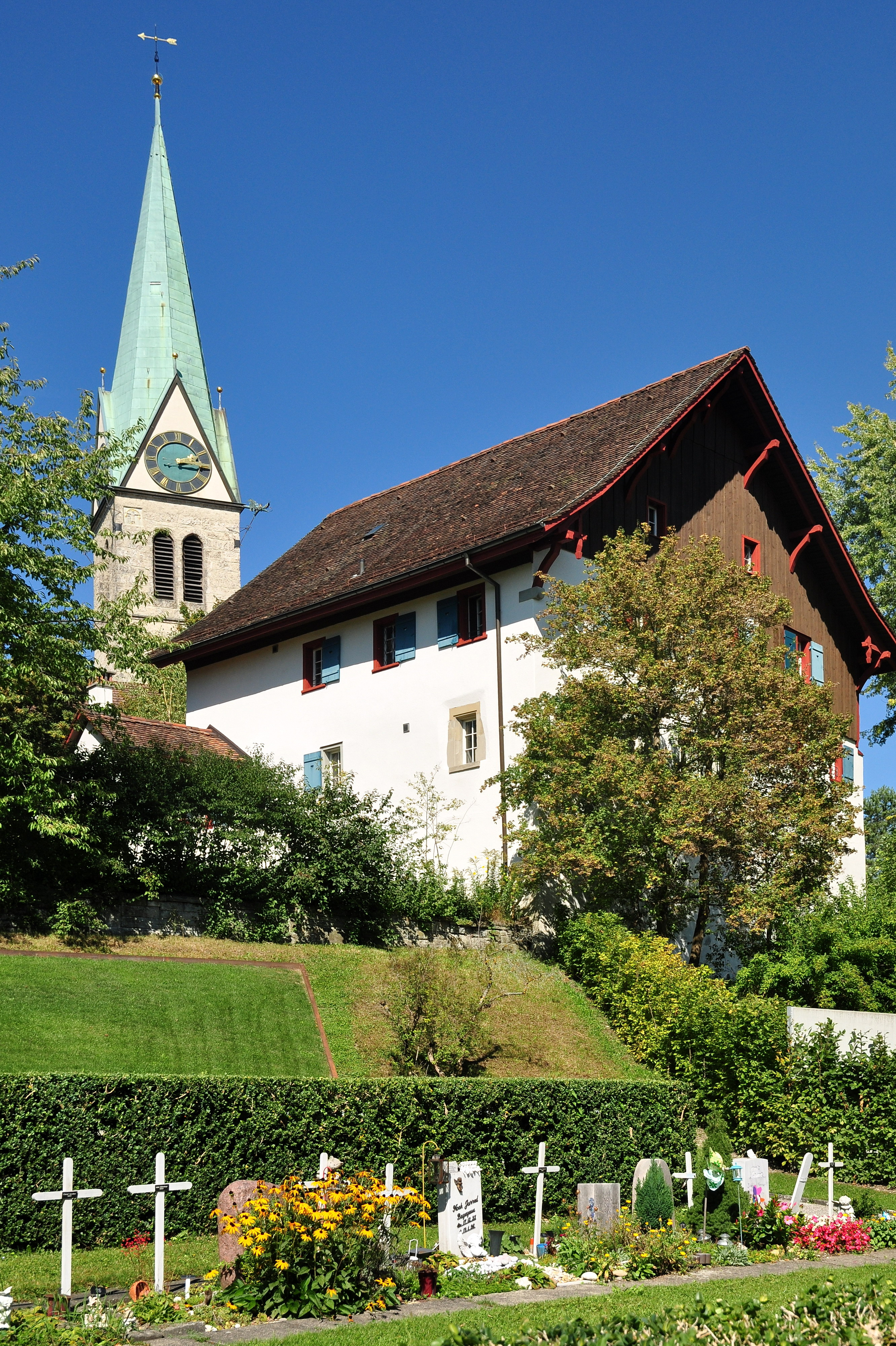

- Flag Seal

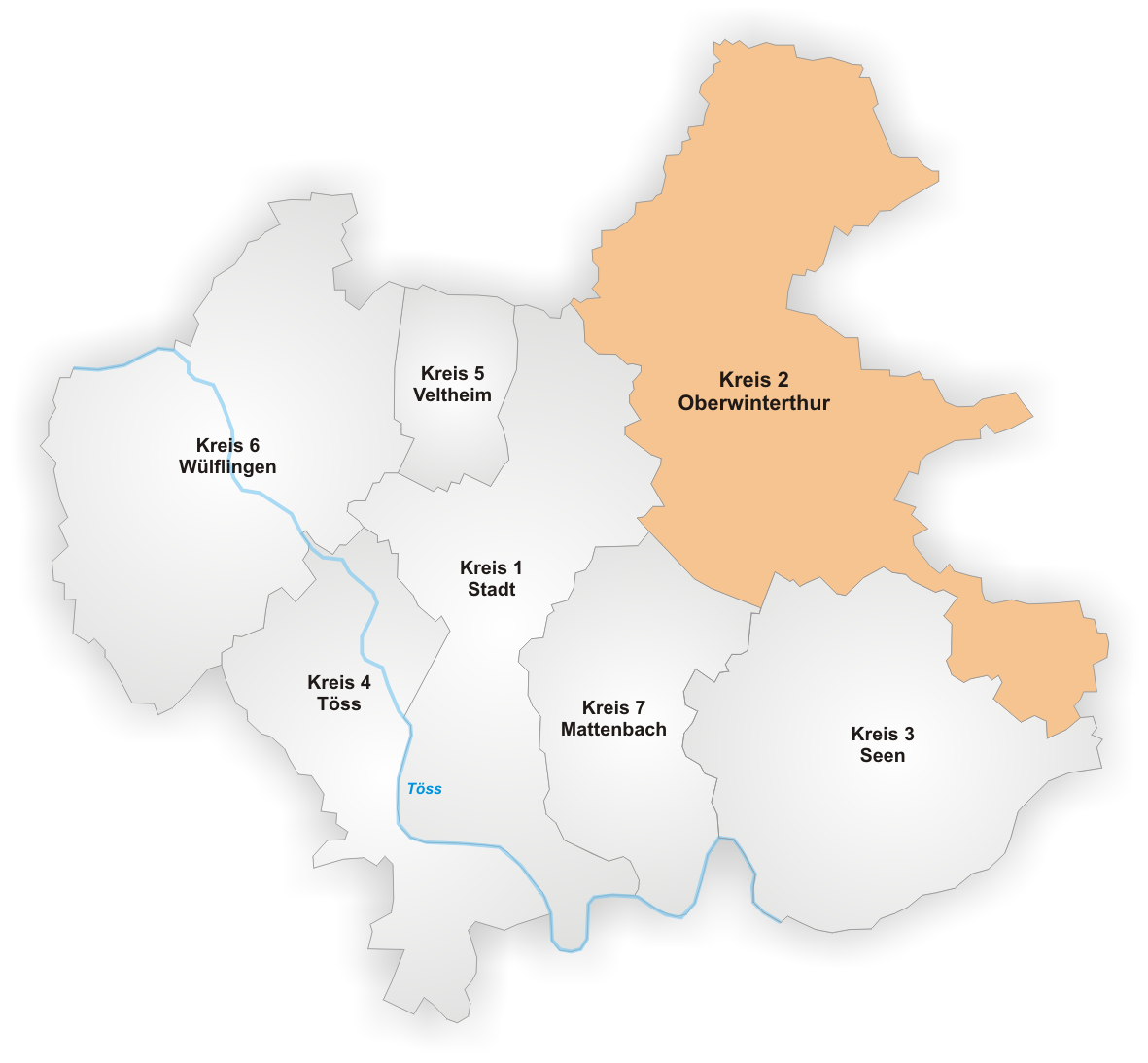
- Country: Switzerland
- Canton: Zürich
- City: Winterthur

Area
  - Total: 17.40 km^{2} (6.72 sq mi)

Population (31. Dec. 2012)
  - Total: 21,748
- District number: 2
- Quarters: Talacker; Guggenbühl; Zinzikon; Reutlingen; Stadel; Grüze; Hegmatten; Hegi

Oberwinterthur (Swiss Standard German pronunciation: [ˈoːbərˌvɪntərtuːr], lit. 'Upper Winterthur') is a district in the Swiss city of Winterthur. It is district number 2.

The district comprises the quarters Talacker, Guggenbühl, Zinzikon, Reutlingen, Stadel, Grüze, Hegmatten and Hegi.

Oberwinterthur was formerly a municipality of its own, but was incorporated into Winterthur in 1922, and the location of the Roman Vicus Vitudurum.

Aerial view from 200 m by Walter Mittelholzer (1934)

== Transport ==
Oberwinterthur railway station is a stop of the Zürich S-Bahn on the lines S8, S29 and S30.
