= Winterthur railway station =

Railway station in Winterthur, Switzerland

Winterthur
- The station frontage

General information
- Location: Bahnhofplatz 5–9; Winterthur; Switzerland
- Coordinates: 47°30′01″N 8°43′26″E
- Elevation: 438 m (1,437 ft)
- System: Central pass-through railway station
- Owner: Swiss Federal Railways
- Operator: Swiss Federal Railways
- Lines: Zurich–Winterthur line; Töss line; Winterthur–Bülach–Koblenz line; Rheinfall line; Winterthur–Etzwilen line; Winterthur–Romanshorn line; Winterthur–Wil line
- Distance: 26.1 km (16.2 mi) from Zürich HB; 137.8 km (85.6 mi) from Sargans
- Platforms: 3 island platforms; 2 Hausperron
- Tracks: 9
- Train operators: Swiss Federal Railways; Thurbo
- Connections
- Trolleybus: Stadtbus Winterthur 1 2 2E 3
- Bus: Stadtbus Winterthur 4 5 7 10 12 660 674; PostAuto bus lines 670 671 676 680
- Airport: Direct line to/from Zurich Airport with in 0:13h, S24 in 0:17h or other connections with one change

Construction
- Parking: Parking deck above platforms
- Cycle facilities: Parking station
- Architect: 1855: A. Beck; 1860: Jakob Friedrich Wanner; 1896: Ernst Jung and Otto Bridler
- Architectural style: 1896: Neorenaissance

Other information
- Fare zone: 120 (ZVV)
- Website: Bahnhof Winterthur

History
- Opened: 1855 (wooden construction); 1860 (total reconstruction); 1894-1896 (total reconstruction)
- Rebuilt: 1875; July 1988: car park deck; 2000: new building "Stadttor"; 2012-2013: Bahnhofplatz reconstruction; 2015-2021: renovation and major enhancements
- Former names: Winterthur Hauptbahnhof

Passengers
- 2025: 103,800 per day (SBB, Thurbo)
- Rank: 4 out 1,095 (Note: Tied with Basel SBB)

Services
Preceding station	SBB CFF FFS	Following station
Zürich HB Terminus	EuroCity	St. Gallen towards München Hbf
Zürich Airport towards Geneva Airport	IC 1	Wil towards St. Gallen
Zürich Airport towards Lausanne	IC 5	St. Gallen towards St. Gallen or Rorschach
Zürich Airport towards Brig	IC 8	Frauenfeld towards Romanshorn
Zürich Airport towards Interlaken Ost	IC 81	Frauenfeld towards Romanshorn
Zürich Airport towards Zürich HB	IR 13	Wil towards Sargans
Zürich Airport towards Lucerne	IR 75	Frauenfeld towards Konstanz
Preceding station	Zurich S-Bahn	Following station
Kemptthal towards Rapperswil	S7	Terminus
Effretikon towards Pfäffikon SZ	S8	Terminus
Stettbach towards Aarau	S11	Oberwinterthur towards Seuzach
Stettbach towards Aarau	S11	Winterthur Grüze towards Sennhof-Kyburg
Stettbach towards Brugg AG	S12	Hettlingen towards Schaffhausen
Stettbach towards Brugg AG	S12	Winterthur Grüze towards Wil
Zürich Stadelhofen towards Zürich HB	S23	Frauenfeld towards Romanshorn
Kemptthal towards Zug	S24	Andelfingen towards Thayngen
Kemptthal towards Zug	S24	Oberwinterthur towards Weinfelden
Terminus	S26	Winterthur Grüze towards Rüti ZH
Terminus	S29	Oberwinterthur towards Stein am Rhein
Terminus	S33	Hettlingen towards Schaffhausen
Terminus	S35	Winterthur Grüze towards Wil
Winterthur Töss towards Bülach	S41	Terminus
Effretikon towards Aarau	SN1 Limited service	Terminus
Terminus	SN3 Limited service	Hettlingen towards Stein am Rhein
Effretikon towards Würenlos	SN6 Limited service	Terminus
Effretikon towards Olten	SN11 Limited service	Terminus
Winterthur Töss towards Bülach	SN41 Limited service	Terminus
Preceding station	St. Gallen S-Bahn	Following station
Terminus	SN21 Limited service	Winterthur Grüze towards St. Gallen
Terminus	SN22 Limited service	Wil towards Heerbrugg
Terminus	SN30 Limited service	Oberwinterthur towards Romanshorn
Location
- Location within Switzerland Location within Canton of Zurich

Winterthur railway station (German: Bahnhof Winterthur) is the principal railway station of the city of Winterthur in the Swiss canton of Zurich, and a major junction station of several railway lines. The station is listed on the Swiss Inventory of Cultural Property of National Significance.

Winterthur is Switzerland's fifth-busiest station, and is a major node between Switzerland's largest railway nucleus in Zurich and places in Eastern Switzerland (such as St. Gallen and Schaffhausen), as well as Germany (Konstanz, Munich), and Austria (Bregenz). The station is served by trains on Zurich's suburban S-Bahn network, as well as by InterRegio (IR) and InterCity (IC) and EuroCity (EC) trains, with all through passenger trains making a stop. It is directly linked to Zürich Flughafen – Zurich Airport's railway station – within 15 minutes travelling time seven times per hour. Zürich Hauptbahnhof (Zürich HB) can be reached with up to 16 direct connections per hour, the fastest of which takes 22 minutes. The station has five standard-gauge platforms serving nine tracks and is the central node of the local Stadtbus Winterthur network and regional bus services (e.g. PostBus Switzerland). All public transport in and around Winterthur is part of the Zürcher Verkehrsverbund (ZVV) integrated fare network.

Winterthur is one of ten railway stations in the city of Winterthur (fare zone 120 of ZVV), the others being: Oberwinterthur, Reutlingen, Sennhof-Kyburg, Winterthur Grüze, Winterthur Hegi, Winterthur Seen, Winterthur Töss, Winterthur Wallrüti, and Winterthur Wülflingen.

== Location ==
Bahnhof Winterthur is centrally located, at the northwestern edge of the city centre (Altstadt). To the north of the station are the Red Tower and the ZHAW School of Management and Law.

== History ==
In 1855, the first temporary station building was built in Winterthur as a timber framed structure. The design of the building was by A. Beck, who also managed the construction. The building was sold in 1860 to the City of Zurich, which wanted to move and rebuild it in the vicinity of the Kornhaus. Most likely, it was used for the construction of the Kornhauswirtschaft, as these two buildings bear a very great resemblance.

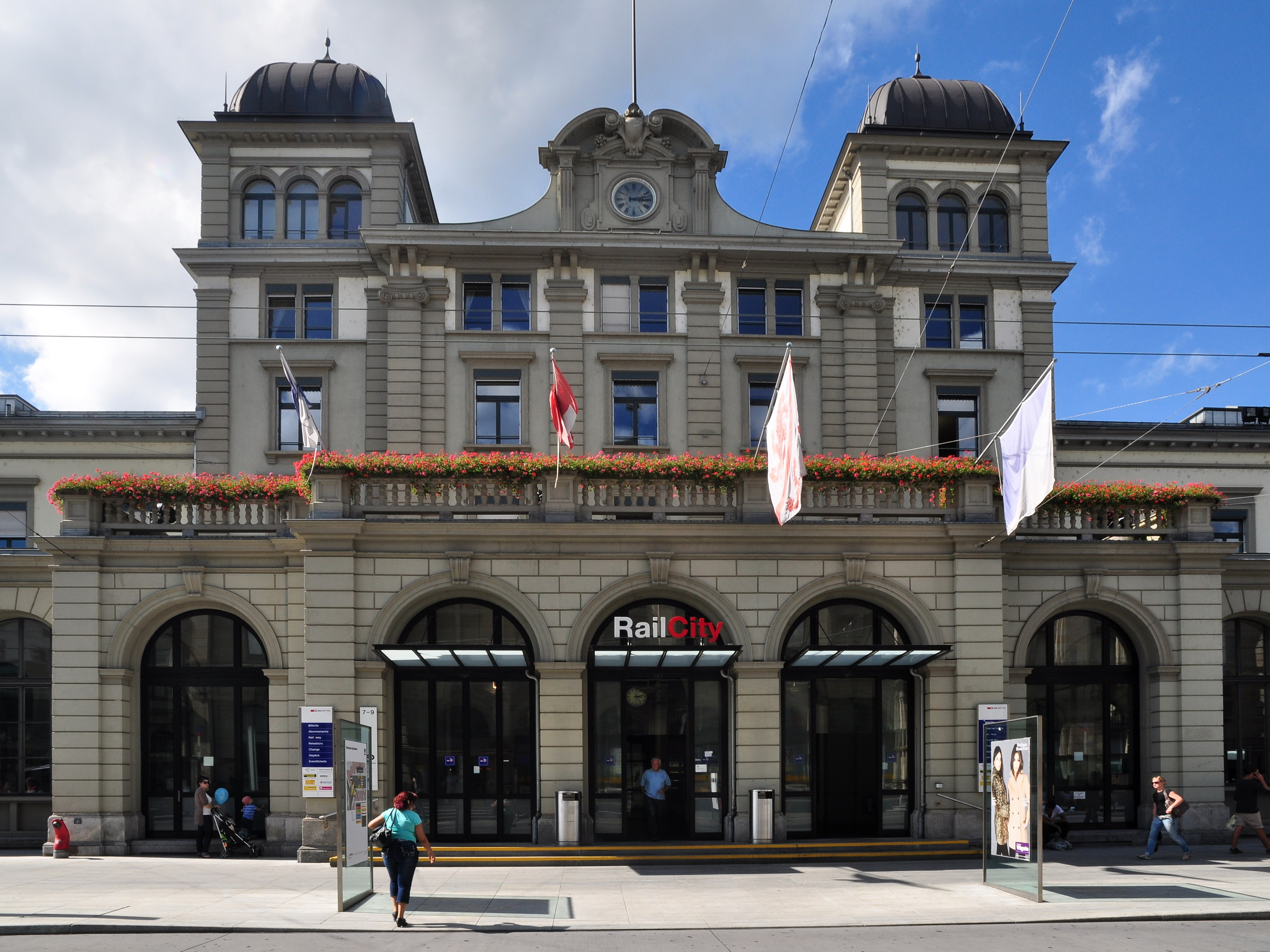
Entrance to the station building, 2011

Five years after the opening of the provisional building, the first real station was built, under the direction of the architect Jakob Friedrich Wanner, who, together with A. Beck, was responsible for the design. The builder, Meier, came from Winterthur, and the train shed was built by the firm Benkiser of Pforzheim. In 1875, its first expansion was completed, to coincide with the commencement of the Winterthur operations of the Tösstalbahn (lit. 'Töss Valley railway') and the Nationalbahn. This expansion consisted of an extension to each side of the station building equal to the width of four window bays, in order to create space for new waiting rooms.

Further renovations in 1894−96 left the station building in its present form. These renovations, proposed by the architect Ernst Jung and Otto Bridler, produced a station building in Renaissance style; the Federal Palace of Switzerland served as a template.

In 1944, the present day tracks 8 and 9 were added. In 1980, the station was again extended by two tracks (the current platforms 1 and 2), which were used for the Tösstal line and for postal trains. Today, S-Bahn trains to Wil depart from the Postal train track.

In 1988, the two-storey parking deck was built over the station yard. In 2000 followed the construction of the Stadttor Winterthur between the station building and the EPA department store, which is now a Coop City department store.

The term Hauptbahnhof (lit. 'main railway station'), or short HB, for Winterthur railway station is no longer used by Swiss Federal Railways (SBB CFF FFS), the station's owner and operator, but is still sometimes used colloquially. Although the station's name appears simply as "Winterthur" on the station signs and on schedule information, the name Hauptbahnhof is still used for the bus stop in front of the station.

On 28 May 2026, a man was arrested after stabbing three people at the station.

== Layout ==
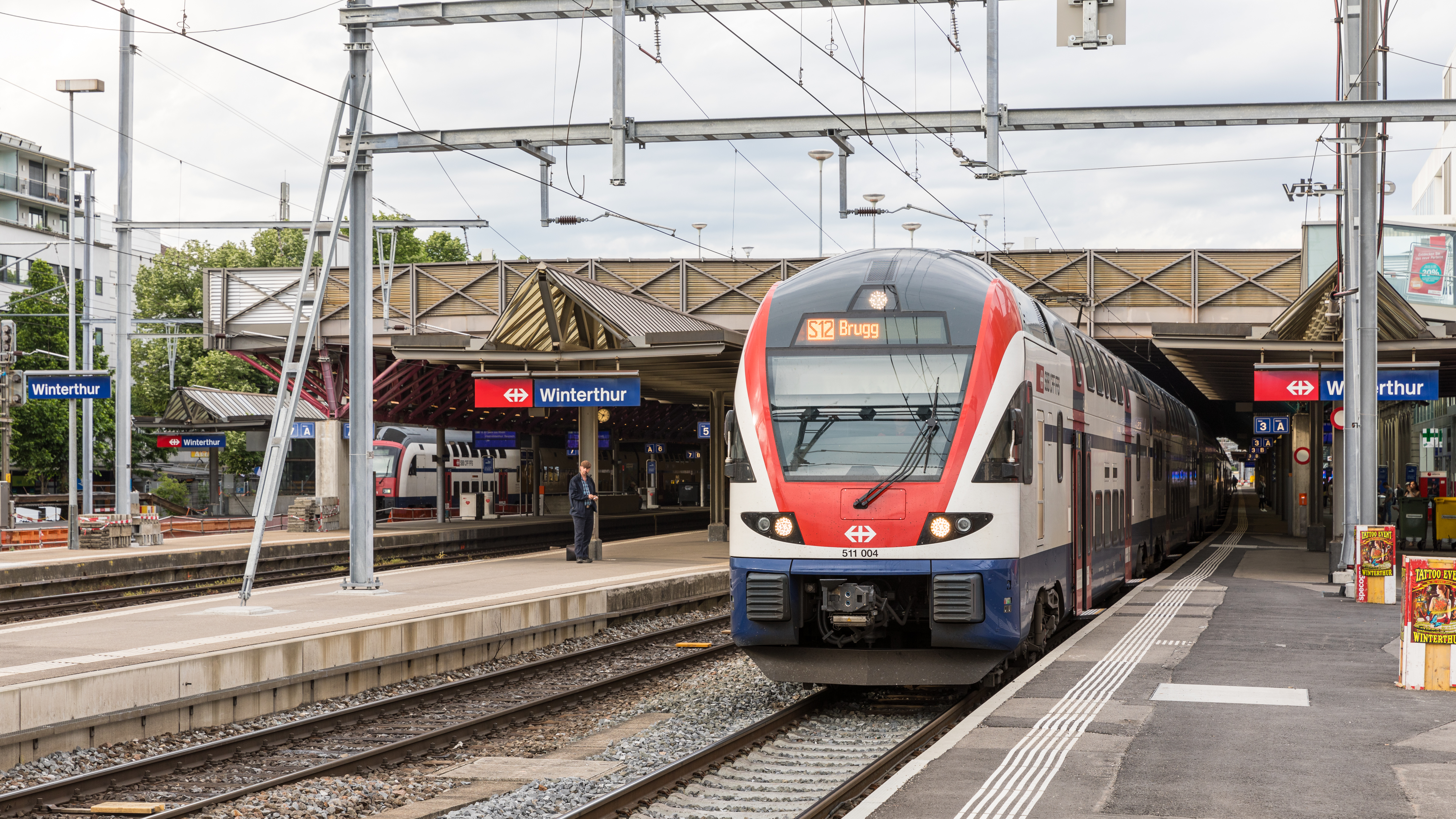
Platforms and trains (2017)

Winterthur is a through station with five platforms and nine tracks (German: Gleis). Tracks 1 and 2 terminate on the east side of the station, while the remaining tracks run through. The platform nearest the station is a side platform serving track 1 only, while the next nearest platform faces both the terminating track 2 and the through-running track 3. This arrangement is similar to a bay platform; platforms that a physically adjacent to station building are called Hausperron. Three island platforms serve tracks 4–9.

In front of the station, on the line towards Zurich, is the former goods station. It was closed in 1995–1996, and serves today only for the storage of trains. As a replacement for the closed structure, a maintenance facility was built at Oberwinterthur railway station.

== Services ==
Winterthur is an intermediate stop of several national and international long-distance trains running under the EuroCity, InterCity and InterRegio categories. It is also a major hub for S-Bahn trains of the Zurich S-Bahn network. On weekends (Friday and Saturday nights), there are also five Nighttime S-Bahn services (SN1, SN3, SN6, SN11, SN41) offered by ZVV, and three nighttime S-Bahn services (SN21, SN22, SN30) offered by the Ostwind tariff network. As of the December 2022 timetable change, the following services stop at Winterthur:

- EuroCity (EC): service every two hours between Zürich HB and München Hbf, via Bregenz (runs as ECE 88 in Germany).
- InterCity:
  - /: half-hourly service between Geneva Airport or Lausanne and St. Gallen, via Zürich HB; hourly service to Rorschach.
  - /: hourly service between Spiez and Romanshorn, via Zürich HB; service every two hours from Spiez to Brig and Interlaken Ost.
- InterRegio:
  - : hourly service between Zürich HB and Chur.
  - : hourly service between Lucerne and Konstanz, via Zürich HB.
- Zurich S-Bahn:
  - S7: half-hourly service to Rapperswil via Zürich HB.
  - S8: half-hourly service to Pfäffikon SZ via Zürich HB.
  - S11: half-hourly service to Aarau via Zürich HB, and hourly service to either Seuzach or Sennhof-Kyburg (rush-hour service continues to Wila).
  - S12: half-hourly service to Brugg AG via Zürich HB, and hourly service to Schaffhausen or Wil.
  - S23: peak-hour service between Zürich HB and Romanshorn via Zürich Stadelhofen.
  - S24: half-hourly service to Zug via Zürich HB, and hourly service to Thayngen or Weinfelden.
  - S26: half-hourly service to Rüti ZH.
  - S29: half-hourly service to Stein am Rhein.
  - S30: hourly service to Weinfelden (combined with the S24 for half-hourly service).
  - S33: hourly service to Schaffhausen (combined with the S12 and S24 for service every 20 minutes).
  - S35: hourly service to Wil (combined with the S12 for half-hourly service).
  - S41: half-hourly service to Bülach.
  - Nighttime S-Bahn (only during weekends):
    - SN1: hourly service to Aarau (via Zürich HB).
    - SN3: hourly service to Stein am Rhein (via Andelfingen and Schaffhausen).
    - SN6: hourly service to Würenlos (via Zürich HB).
    - SN11: hourly service to Olten (via Zürich HB).
    - SN41: hourly service to Bülach (via Embrach-Rorbas).
- St. Gallen S-Bahn (limited service):
  - SN21: hourly service to St. Gallen (via Wil SG).
  - SN22: hourly service to Heerbrugg (via Wil SG).
  - SN30: hourly service to Romanshorn (via Weinfelden).

== Urban public transport ==
Winterthur is the central bus station of the local Stadtbus Winterthur bus operator and therefore also the most important hub of the Winterthur trolleybus system. All but two of the city bus lines stop at the forecourt of Winterthur raiilway station ("Hauptbahnhof", abbreviated to "HB" below). Additionally, several regional Stadtbus (lit. 'City Bus') lines, along with PostAuto lines, all stop there. Only the lines that serve Wiesendangen and a few villages northeast of Winterthur depart from Oberwinterthur station instead, while line 9 departs from Winterthur Seen.

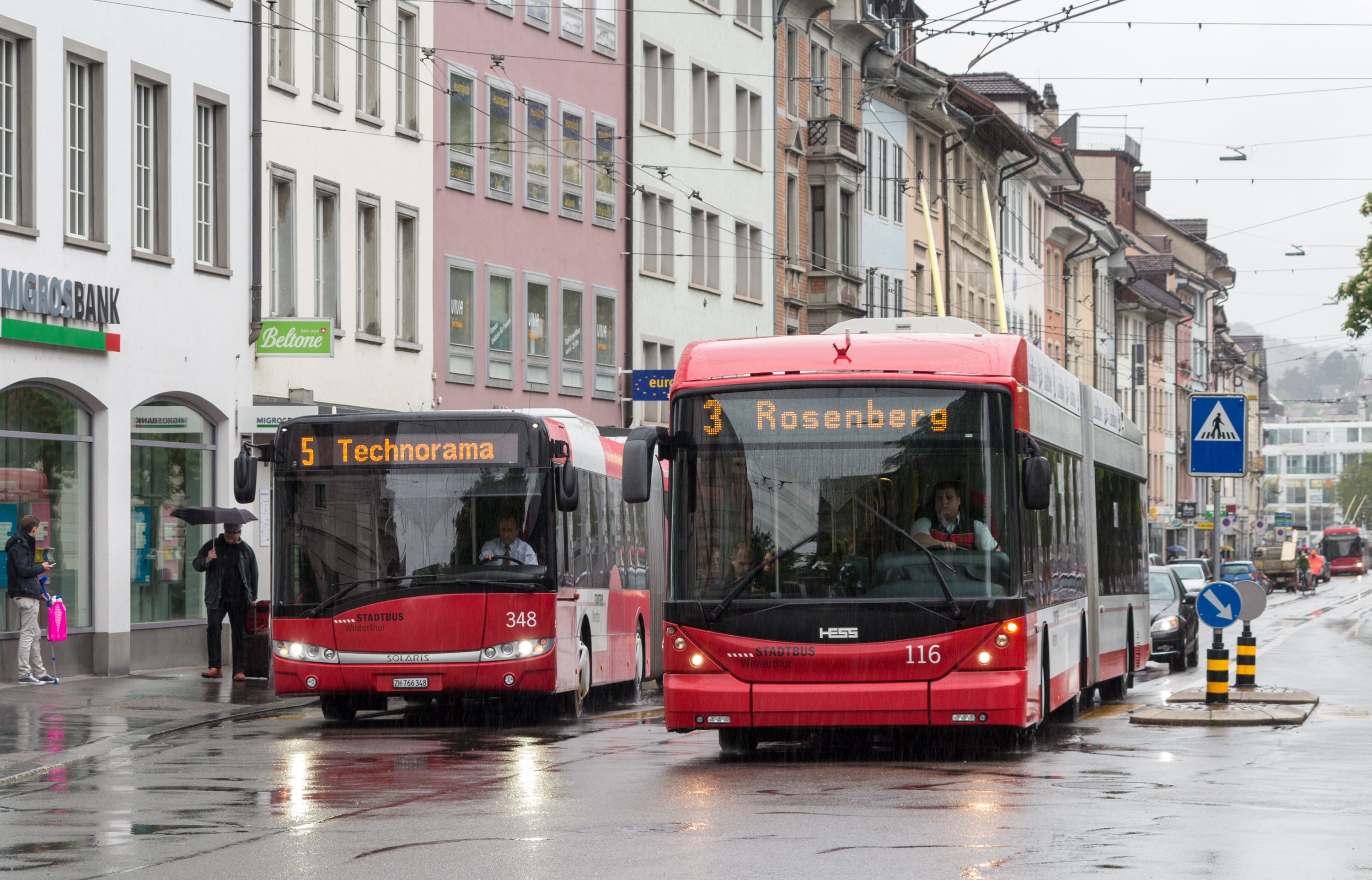
Buses on Stadthausstrasse

=== Stadtbus Winterthur ===
Lines 1–3 are trolleybus lines. The remaining lines are operated exclusively by low-floor buses. Normally, articulated buses run on lines 5, 7 and 14. On the remaining lines, conventional (rigid chassis) buses provide the services. All operate within fare zone 120 of ZVV, except line 7 to Elsau (fare zone 164).

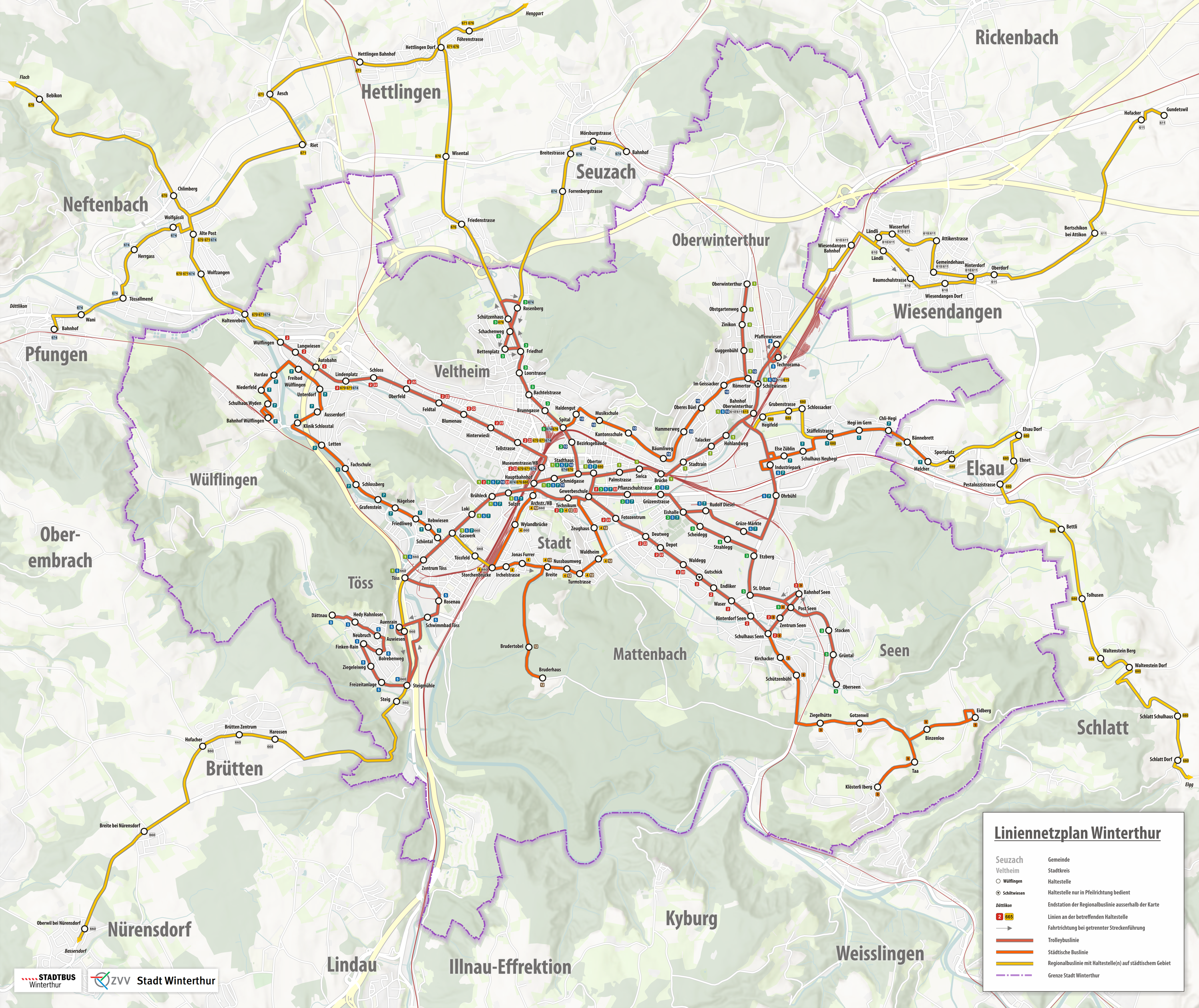
Bus network (as of 2026)

As of the December 2023 timetable change, the following routes serve Winterthur railway station:

Line	Route
1	Töss – HB – Oberwinterthur
2	Wülflingen – HB – Seen
22	Waldegg – HB – Schloss
3	Rosenberg – HB – Oberseen
4	HB – Breite – HB (circle route)
5	Technorama – HB – Dättnau
7	Elsau, Melcher – HB – Schlosstal – Wülflingen
10	HB – Oberwinterthur
12	HB – Bruderhaus – HB

=== Regional lines ===
The yellow numbers are PostAuto lines, and the blue numbers are Stadtbus Winterthur bus lines:

Line	Route
660	HB – Brütten – Nürensdorf – Bassersdorf (- Flughafen)
670	HB – Neftenbach – Berg am Irchel – Flaach – Rafz
671	HB – Neftenbach – Hettlingen
674	HB - Rosenberg - Seuzach
676	HB – Rutschwil – Henggart
680	HB – Elsau – Schlatt – Elgg/Girenbad b. Turbenthal

=== Nighttime buses ===
Several nighttime bus (German: Nachtbus) lines are operated hourly on Friday to Saturday and Saturday to Sunday from 01:30 to 04:30. As the last regular buses usually depart from HB at 0.50 and the first such buses start running again from 05:30, one can therefore speak of a continuously operating network when the nighttime buses are running.

The nighttime buses operate on the following lines, but only outwards; there are no return services.

Line	Route
N59	HB – Strochenbrücke – Schlosstal - Niederfeld - Bahnhof Wülflingen
N60	HB – Oberwinterthur – Seuzach - Adlikon bei Andelfingen (Postauto)
N61	HB – Hegi – Elsau - Wiesendangen - Sulz - Rickenbach – Ellikon - Altikon – Thalheim - Dinhard - Welsikon
N64	HB – Rosenberg – Seuzach – Flaach – Buch am Irchel - Riedt bei Neftenbach (Postauto)
N65	HB – Waldheim – Eishalle – Oberseen
N66	HB – Töss – Brütten – Nürensdorf - Bassersdorf – Lindau - Kemptthal
N67	HB – Wülflingen – Neftenbach – Pfungen – Dättlikon
N68	HB – Seen – Zell – Turbenthal – Wila (Postauto)

== Panorama ==
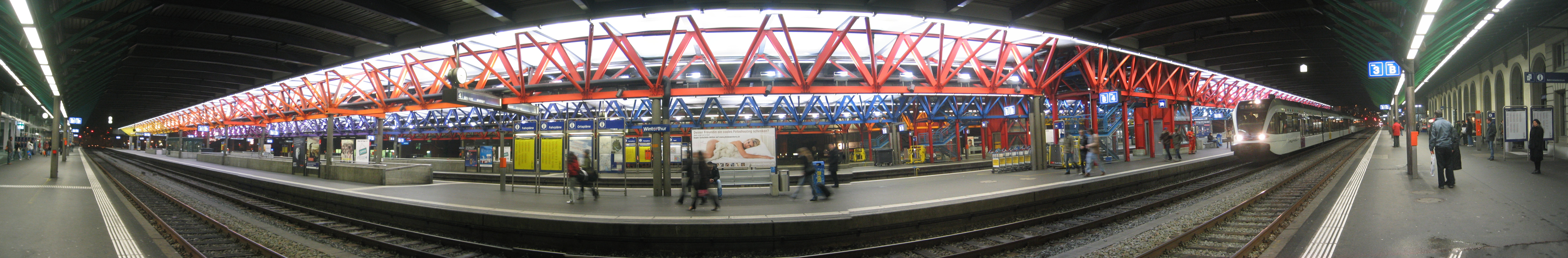
Concourse viewed from platform 3 (directly with one's back to the station building)

== See also ==
- History of rail transport in Switzerland
- Rail transport in Switzerland
- Trams in Winterthur
