= Guggenbühl =

Coordinates: 47.513°N 8.760°E

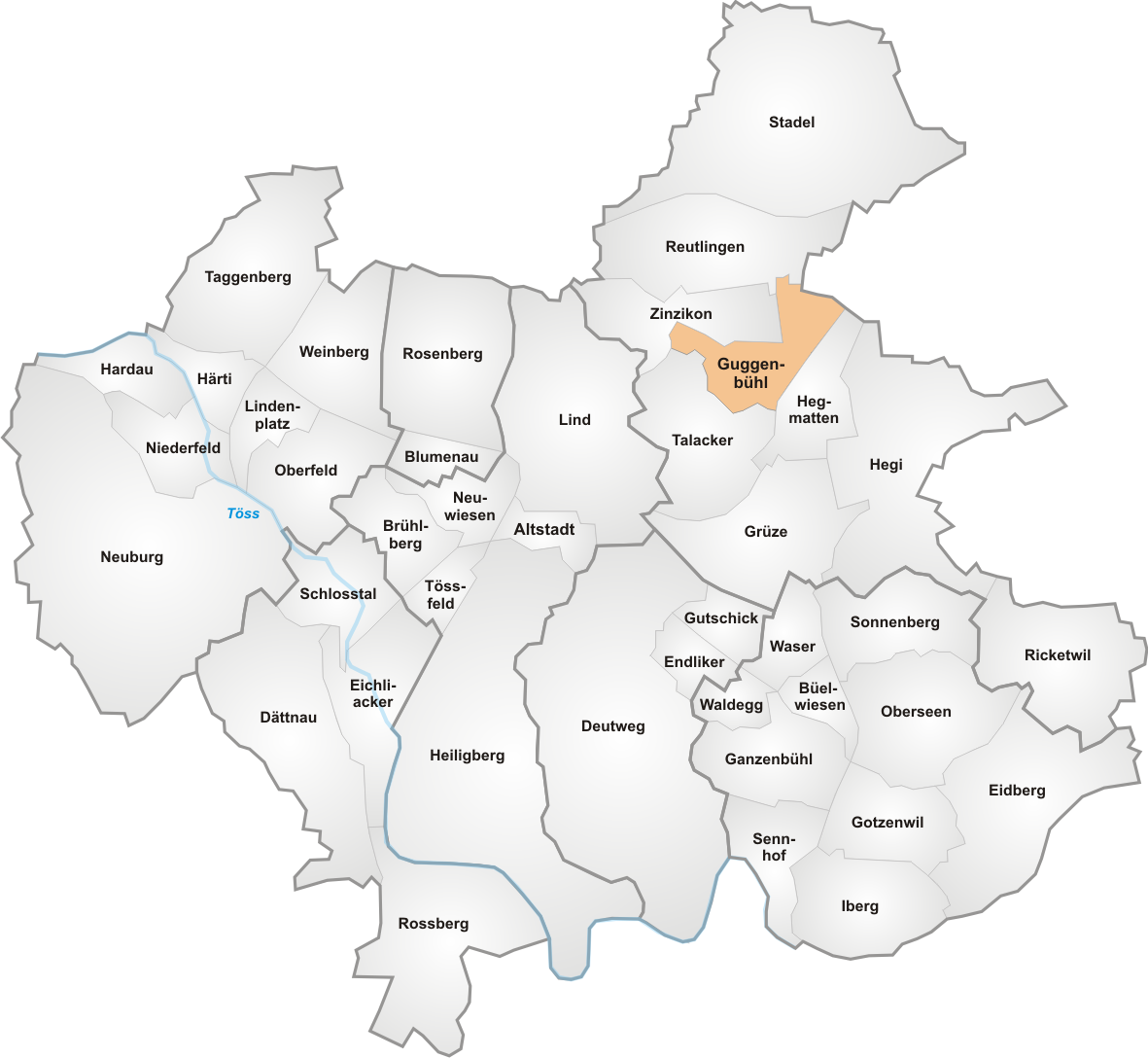
The quarter of Guggenbühl in Winterthur.

Guggenbühl is a quarter in the district 2 (Oberwinterthur) of Winterthur, Switzerland.

It was formerly a part of Oberwinterthur municipality, which was incorporated into Winterthur in 1922.
