= Zinzikon =

Coordinates: 47.5178°N 8.7545°E

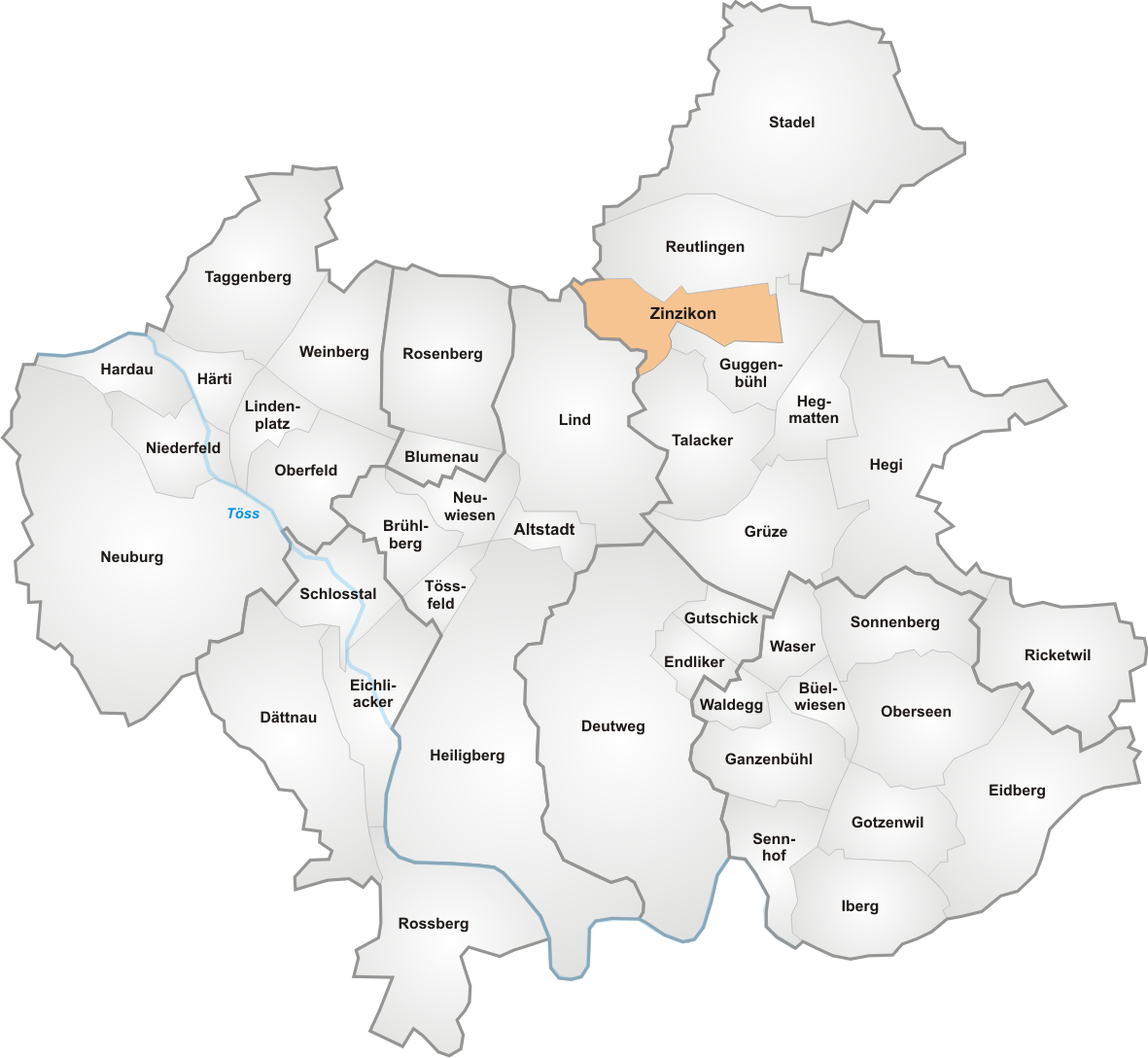
The quarter of Zinzikon in Winterthur.

Zinzikon is a quarter in the district 2 of Winterthur.

It was formerly a part of Oberwinterthur municipality, which was incorporated into Winterthur in 1922.
