= 2026 Winterthur stabbing attack =

Terrorist stabbing attack in Switzerland

- Location: Winterthur, Canton of Zurich, Switzerland
- Date: 28 May 2026
- Target: bus riders
- Attack type: mass stabbing
- Deaths: 0
- Injuries: 3

On 28 May 2026, three people were stabbed at the Winterthur railway station in Winterthur, Switzerland. The accused, a dual Swiss-Turkish national, was later arrested at the scene. The incident was characterized by local authorities as an "act of terror".

== Incident ==
The earliest reports of the attack occurred at 08:28, in which an individual said to be shouting Allahu Akbar (Arabic for "God is great") used a knife and stabbed three victims at the Winterthur railway station. Blick reported that it had obtained video of the attack, showing a man believed to be the perpetrator shouting as he left the station building.

The three Swiss victims, all male, were hospitalised for a time as a result of the incident. A 28-year-old stabbed in the leg and a 43-year-old man with a neck injury were discharged after treatment, while a 52-year-old stabbed in the thigh was hospitalised after having been operated upon for his injuries. A group of schoolchildren nearby fled, but were not harmed.

== Alleged perpetrator ==
A dual Swiss-Turkish citizen, age 31, identified as Nesip Dedeler, was arrested at the scene by police at 08:33. Authorities called the incident an "act of terror" and stated that they believed that the attacker had acted alone. Police officials said that the designation as an act of terror was exceptional and that the intent behind the crime was "in the realm of radicalization and extremism".

Dedeler was born in 1994 in Switzerland and became a naturalised citizen of the country in 2009. He had been in Turkey for the two years prior to the attack, returning to Switzerland in the month the attack occurred. He had been examined at a psychiatric hospital on 25 May after having made "confused comments" and had been released from the facility the day before the attack, after officials there confirmed that he was no longer a danger to himself or the public. Police said that the person had been identified in 2015 as having spread propaganda for Islamic State as part of an investigation related to a mosque in Winterthur, and had faced criminal charges for his ISIS support.

== Prosecution ==
The Office of the Attorney General of Switzerland announced on the day after the incident that the stabbing attack was being treated as a potential act of terrorism and that charges were being considered for attempted murder and for supporting a terrorist organisation.

Swiss authorities seized electronic devices belonging to the individual arrested in the incident and are seeking to have the devices unlocked in order to investigate possible links to other individuals or groups.

== Reactions ==
Federal president Guy Parmelin said that he was "shocked by the terrorist attack" and expressed his hope that the victims would recover.

The Islamic Central Council of Switzerland condemned what it called a "cowardly and barbaric act".
