= Oberwinterthur railway station =

Railway station in Switzerland

Oberwinterthur
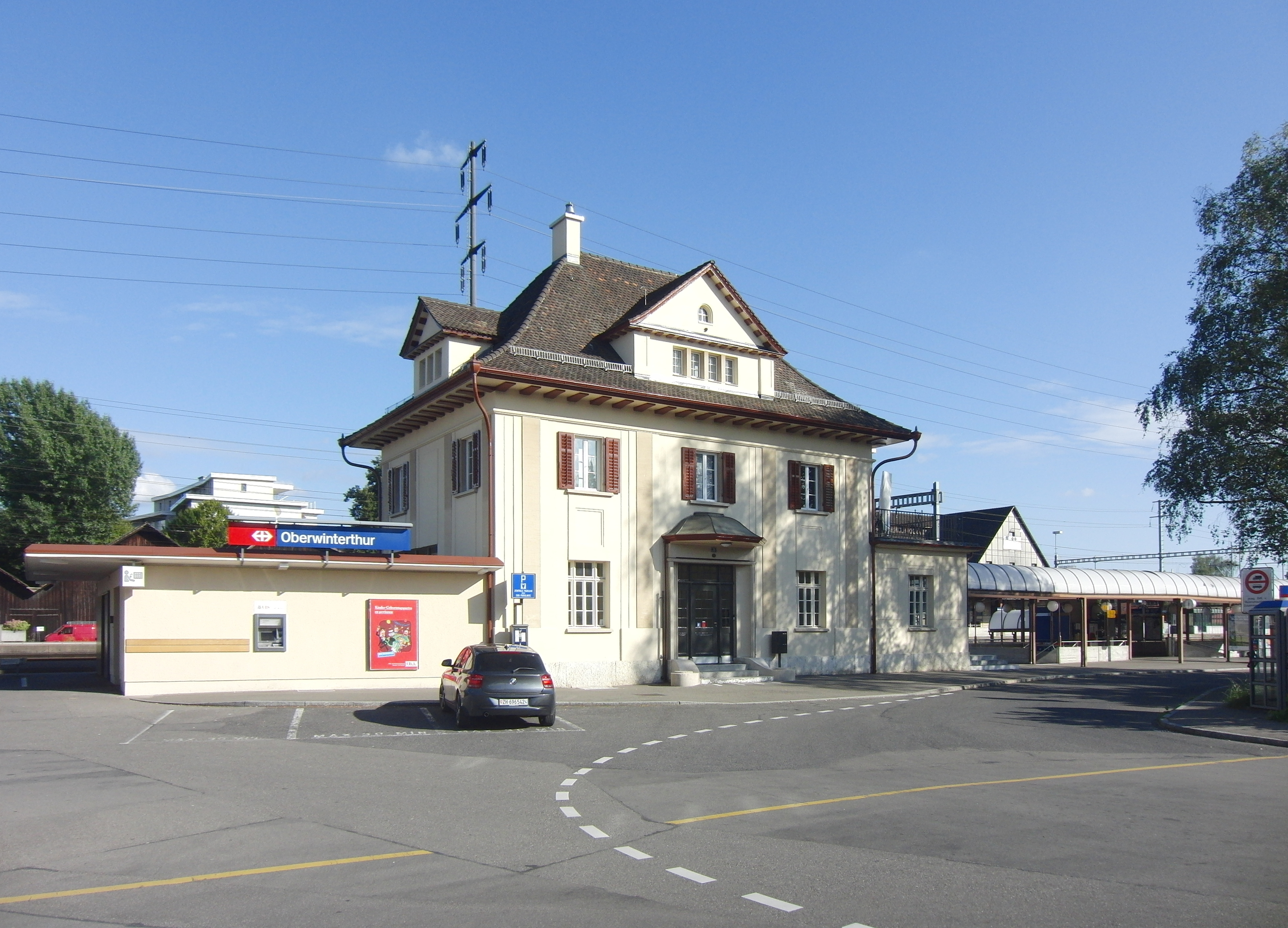
- The station frontage, 2016.

General information
- Location: Hegifeldstrasse 1A; 8404 Winterthur; Winterthur, Zürich; Switzerland
- Coordinates: 47°30′28″N 8°45′39″E
- Elevation: 457 m above the sea
- Owner: Swiss Federal Railways
- Operator: Swiss Federal Railways; Thurbo
- Lines: Winterthur–Etzwilen-Stein am Rhein (821); Winterthur–Romanshorn (840)
- Platforms: 1 island platform, 1 side platform
- Tracks: 3
- Connections: PostAuto and Stadtbus Winterthur buses

Other information
- Fare zone: 120 (ZVV)

History
- Opened: 1855

Services
Preceding station	Zurich S-Bahn	Following station
Winterthur towards Aarau	S11	Winterthur Wallrüti towards Seuzach
Winterthur towards Zug	S24	Wiesendangen towards Weinfelden
Winterthur Terminus	S29	Winterthur Wallrüti towards Stein am Rhein
Winterthur Terminus	S30	Wiesendangen towards Weinfelden
Preceding station	St. Gallen S-Bahn	Following station
Winterthur Terminus	SN30 Limited service	Wiesendangen towards Romanshorn
Location
- Location within Switzerland Location within Canton of Zurich

Oberwinterthur railway station (German: Bahnhof Oberwinterthur) is a railway station that serves Oberwinterthur, which is district number 2 in Winterthur, a city in the canton of Zurich, Switzerland. It is one of ten railway stations in the city of Winterthur (fare zone 120 of ZVV), the others being: Reutlingen, Sennhof-Kyburg, Winterthur, Winterthur Grüze, Winterthur Hegi, Winterthur Seen, Winterthur Töss, Winterthur Wallrüti, and Winterthur Wülflingen.

Opened in 1855, the station is of simple design, and is owned and operated by the Swiss Federal Railways. It is served by four Zurich S-Bahn lines. As the terminus of three regional bus lines, it is also a transfer station for commuters.

== Location ==
Oberwinterthur railway station is situated right in the centre of Oberwinterthur.

North of the station, in Hegmatten, is the Zugunterhaltungsanlage Oberwinterthur, where the double-decker Zurich S-Bahn trains and the Stadler Flirt und GTW multiple unit trains are maintained. A vehicle maintenance facility for other users is planned.

== Services ==
=== S-Bahn ===
The station is served by the following four Zurich S-Bahn lines:

- S11 Aarau–Lenzburg–Dietikon–Zürich HB–Zürich Stettbach–Winterthur–Seuzach/Sennhof-Kyburg (–Wila)
  Operates non stop between Stettbach and Winterthur; the lines to Seuzach and Sennhof-Kyburg are operated alternately at hourly intervals; supplementary trains to Wila.
- S24 Thayngen/Weinfelden–Winterthur–Zürich Flughafen –Wipkingen–Zürich HB–Thalwil–Zug
  Services stop in Kemptthal until 9:20 PM; the lines to Thayngen and Weinfelden are operated alternately at hourly intervals; stops between Neuhausen and Winterthur only in Andelfingen.
- S29 Winterthur–Stein am Rhein
- S30 Winterthur–Frauenfeld–Weinfelden (–Romanshorn–Rorschach)

Nighttime S-Bahn

During weekends, Oberwinterthur is served by a nighttime S-Bahn service (SN30), offered by Ostwind fare network, and operated by Thurbo for St. Gallen S-Bahn. The line to Stein am Rhein is served not by night trains, but by various night bus lines.

SN30: hourly service to Winterthur and to Romanshorn (via Weinfelden).

=== Bus ===
Bahnhof Oberwinterthur bus station

This is the actual bus station for the railway station, and is located on the same side of the tracks as the station building.

The first three bus lines serving this bus station are operated by the city network. The other three are regional lines that terminate at Oberwinterthur railway station. Of the regional lines, the yellow line 615 is operated by PostBus Switzerland, while the other two are operated by the city bus network.

Line	Route
1	Töss – Bhf. Winterthur – Bhf. Oberwinterthur – Oberwinterthur
5	Technorama – Bhf. Oberwinterthur – Bhf. Winterthur – Dättnau
10	Bhf. Winterthur – Bhf. Oberwinterthur
610	Bhf. Oberwinterthur – Wiesendangen, Dorf – Bhf. Oberwinterthur (circle route)
611	Bhf. Oberwinterthur – Gundetswil
615	Bhf. Oberwinterthur – Rickenbach – Ellikon a. d Thur – Altikon

Hegifeld bus station

The Hegifeld bus station is located on the side of the tracks opposite from the station building, but is nevertheless connected directly with the railway station and its platforms by a pedestrian underpass.

Line	Route
15	Hegifeld – Bahnhof Hegi – Hegifeld (circle route)
680	Bhf. Winterthur – Hegifeld – Elsau – Schlatt – Elgg/Girenbad b. Turbenthal*

* Line 680 runs three times each day to Girenbad bei Turbenthal.

==== Night buses ====
Line	Route
N61	Bhf. Winterthur – Bhf. Oberwinterthur – Oberwinterthur – Stadel – Sulz – Rickenbach – Ellikon – Altikon – Thalheim – Grüt – Dinhard

The night bus N65 (Bhf. Winterthur – Oberseen – Hegi – Elsau – Wiesendangen) also serves Hegifeld station, but only for alighting passengers.

== See also ==
- History of rail transport in Switzerland
- Rail transport in Switzerland
