= Hegmatten =

Coordinates: 47°30′55″N 8°46′13″E

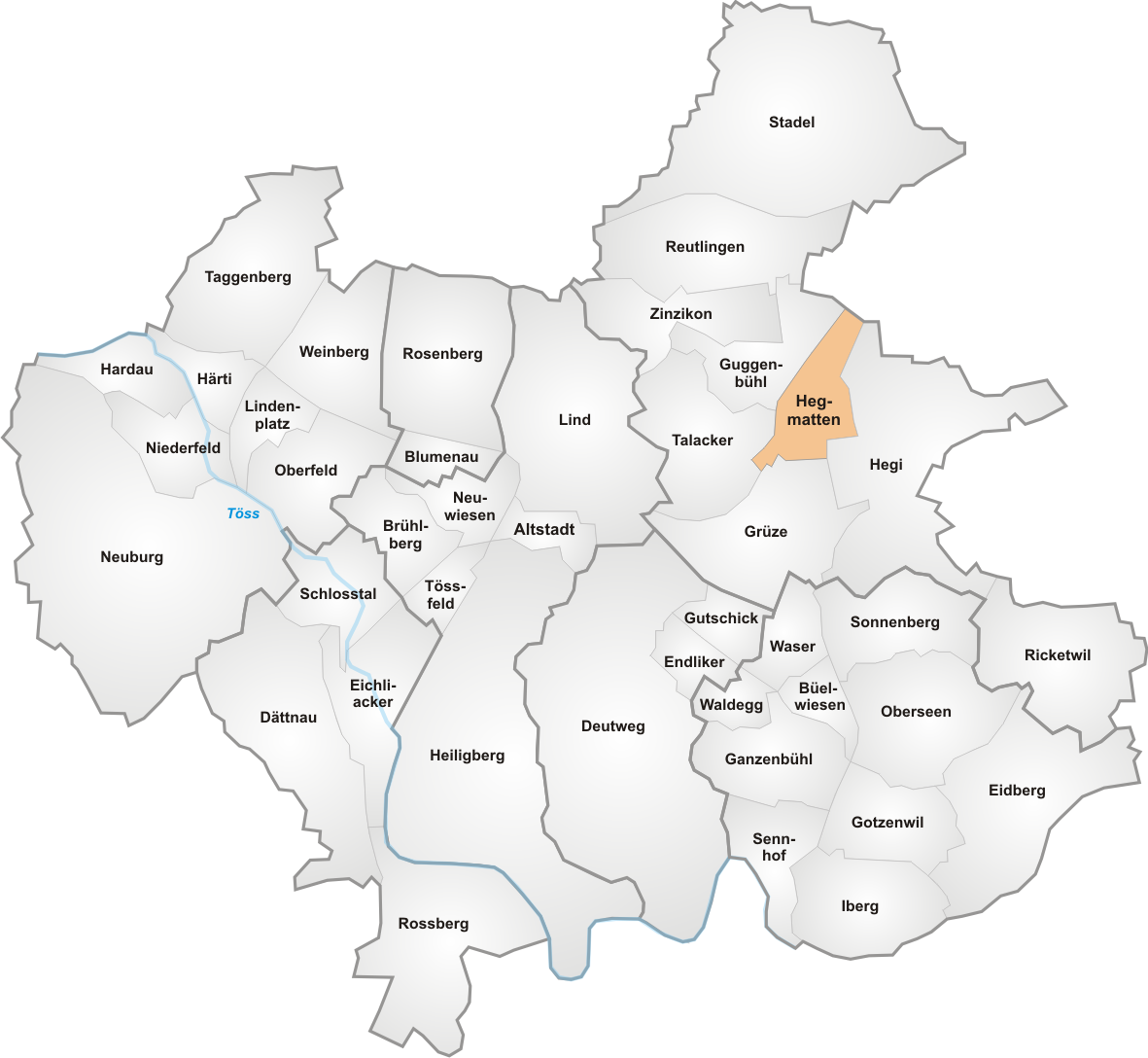
The quarter of Hegmatten in Winterthur.

Hegmatten is a quarter in the district 2 (Oberwinterthur) of Winterthur.

It was formerly a part of Oberwinterthur municipality, which was incorporated into Winterthur in 1922.
