= Sennhof-Kyburg railway station =

Railway station in Canton of Zurich, Switzerland

Sennhof-Kyburg
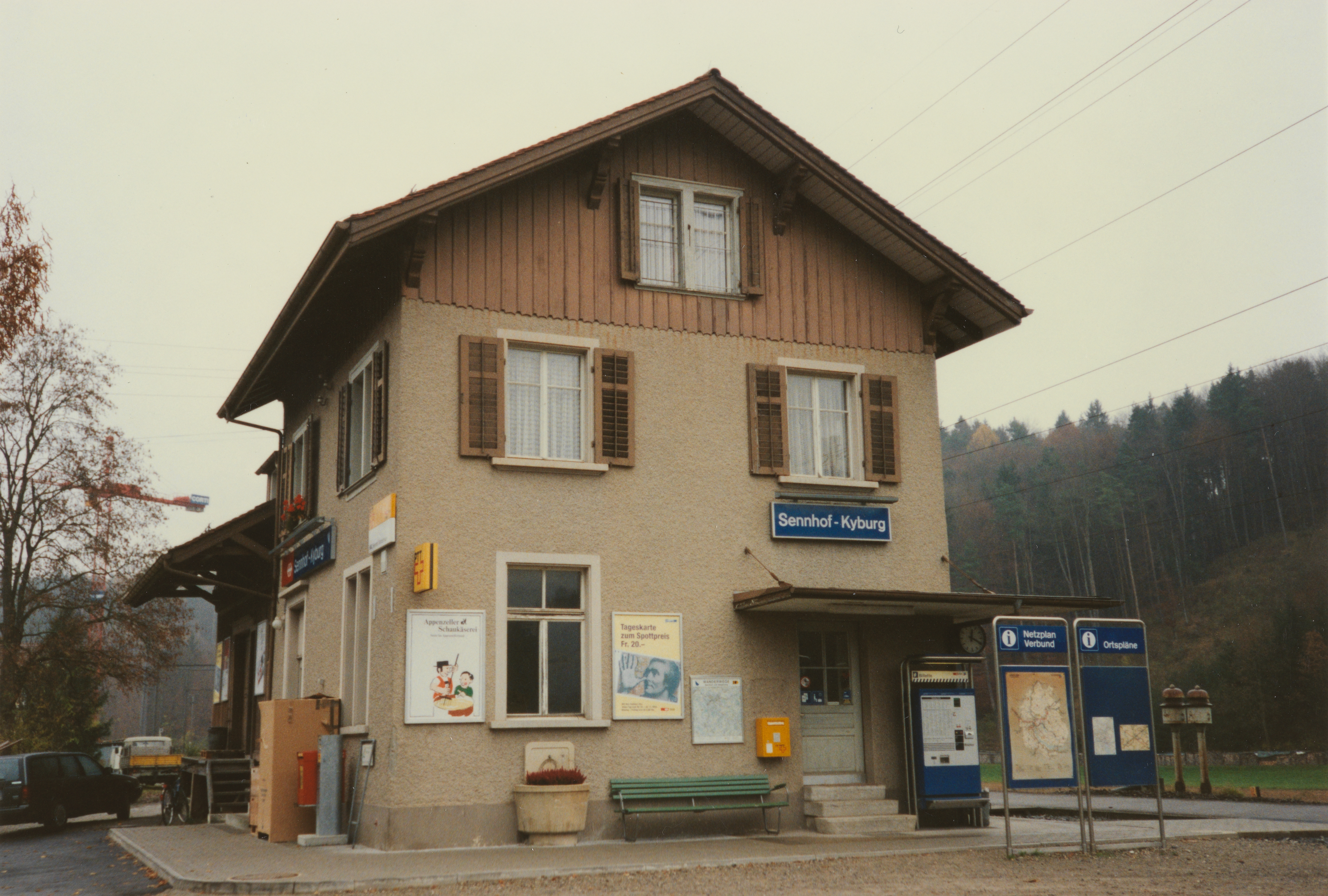
- Station in 1994

General information
- Location: Tösstalstrasse; Sennhof; Winterthur, Zurich; Switzerland
- Coordinates: 47.465098°N 8.760631°E
- Elevation: 484 m (1,588 ft)
- Owner: Swiss Federal Railways
- Operator: Swiss Federal Railways; Thurbo
- Line: Tösstalbahn
- Platforms: 2 side platforms
- Tracks: 2

Other information
- Fare zone: 120 (ZVV)

Services
Preceding station	Zurich S-Bahn	Following station
Winterthur Seen towards Aarau	S11	Kollbrunn towards Wila
Winterthur Seen towards Winterthur	S26	Kollbrunn towards Rüti ZH
Location
- Location within Switzerland Location within Canton of Zurich

Sennhof-Kyburg railway station is a railway station in the city of Winterthur in the canton of Zurich, Switzerland. It takes its name from the city's quarter of Sennhof, in which it is located, together with the adjoining municipality of Kyburg. The station is located on the Tösstal line in the Töss Valley.

Sennhof-Kyburg is one of ten railway stations in the city of Winterthur (fare zone 120 of ZVV), the others being: Oberwinterthur, Reutlingen, Winterthur, Winterthur Grüze, Winterthur Hegi, Winterthur Seen, Winterthur Töss, Winterthur Wallrüti, and Winterthur Wülflingen.

== Services ==
The station is an intermediate stop on Zurich S-Bahn services S11 and S26. During the day, the station is the terminus of the S11, while the service continues to Wila during rush-hour.

- Zurich S-Bahn
  - S11: hourly service to Aarau, via Zürich HB, and hourly service to Wila during peak-hour
  - S26: half-hourly service between Winterthur and Rüti ZH

== See also ==
- Rail transport in Switzerland
