= Hegi =

Coordinates: 47.503°N 8.774°E

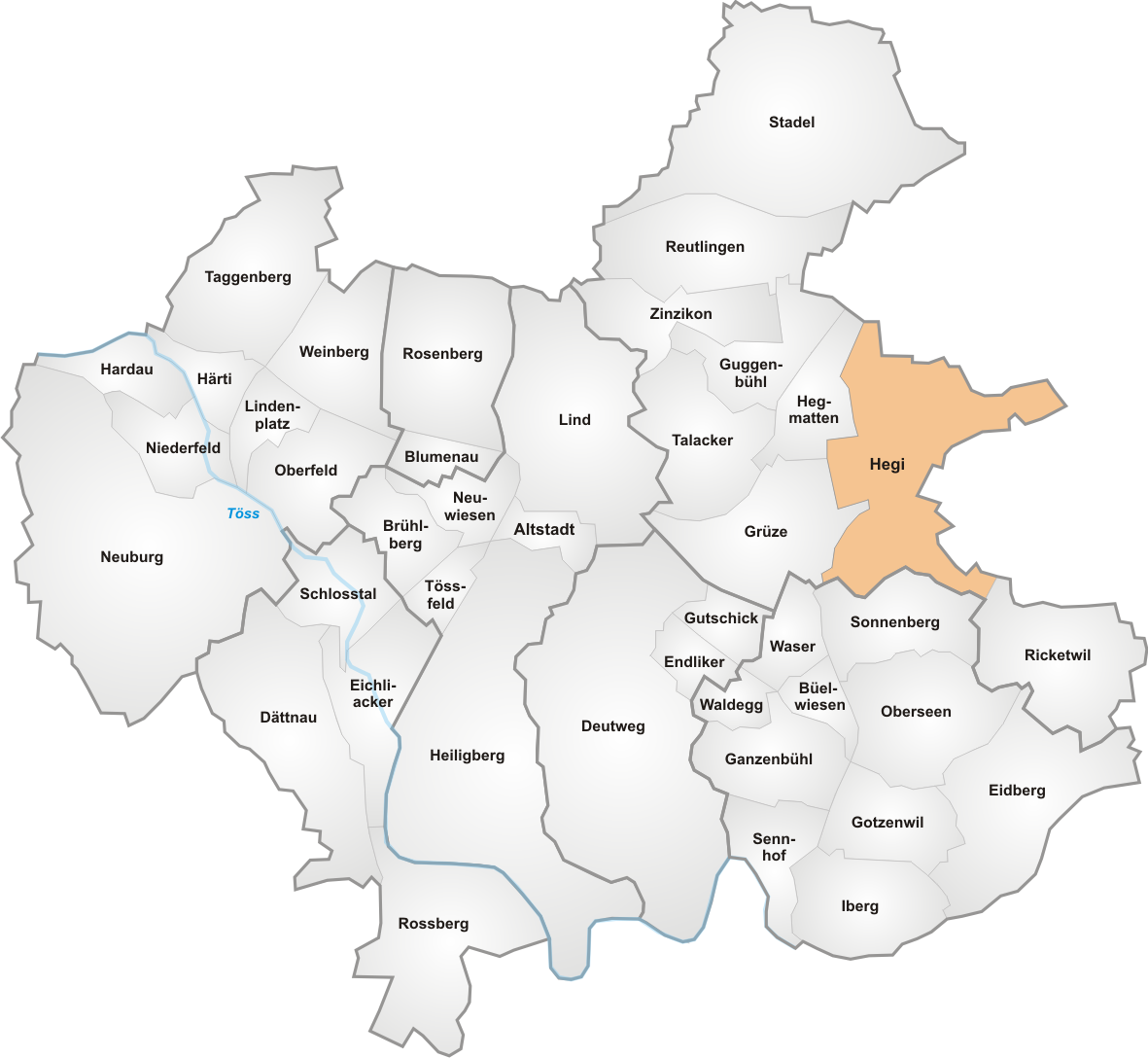
The quarter of Hegi in Winterthur.

Hegi is a quarter in the district 2 of Winterthur, a canton of Zurich, Switzerland.

It was formerly a part of Oberwinterthur municipality, which was incorporated into Winterthur in 1922.

Aerial view from 300 m by Walter Mittelholzer (1923)
