= Grüze =

Coordinates: 47°29′56″N 8°45′16″E

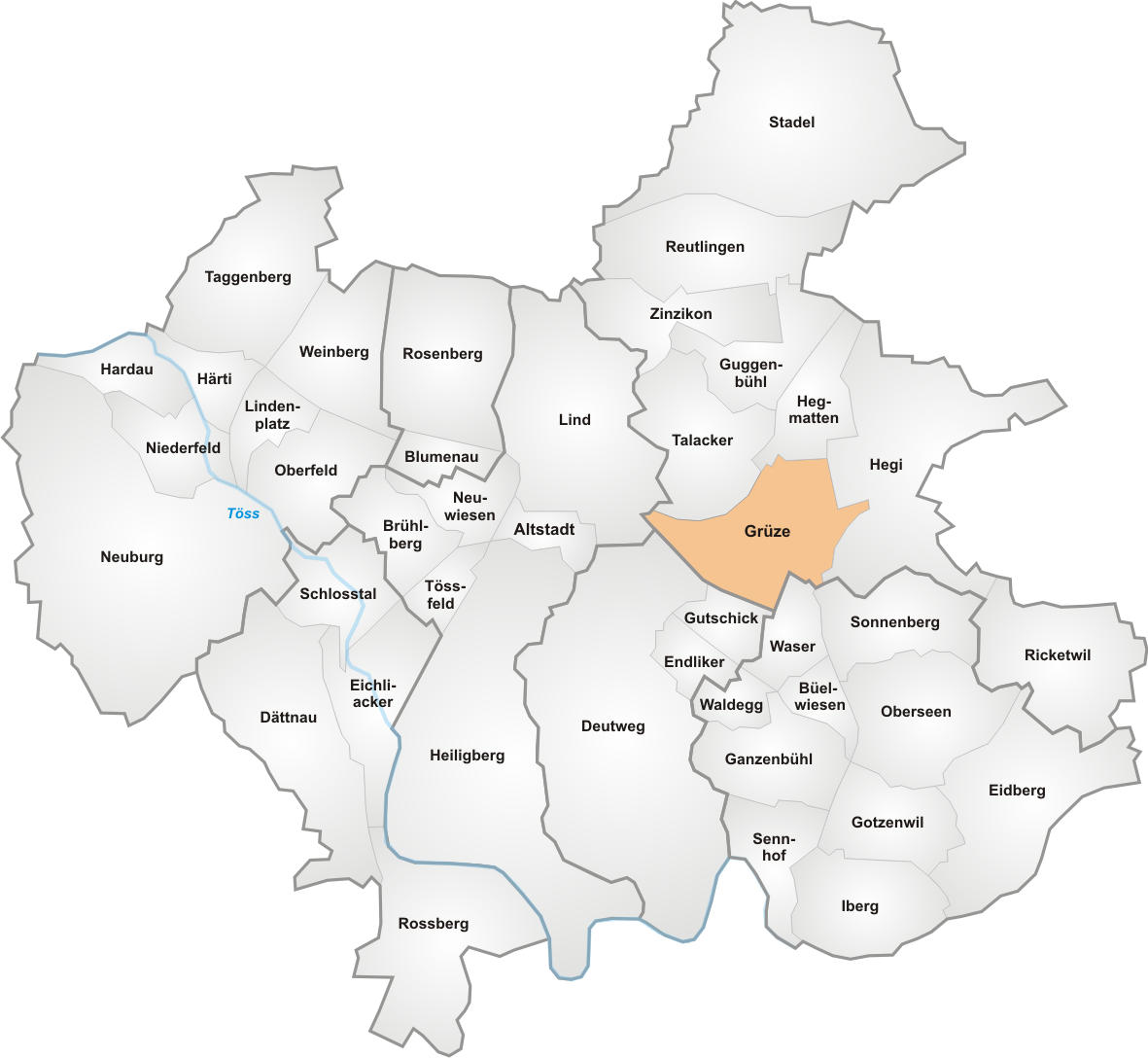
The quarter of Grüze in Winterthur.

Grüze (Swiss Standard German pronunciation: [ˈɡrʏtsɛ]) is a quarter in the district 2 of Winterthur, Switzerland.

It was a part of Oberwinterthur municipality, which was incorporated into Winterthur in 1922.

== Transport ==
Winterthur Grüze railway station is a stop of the S-Bahn Zürich on the lines S12, S11, S26 and S35.
