= Winterthur Hegi railway station =

Swiss railway station

Winterthur Hegi
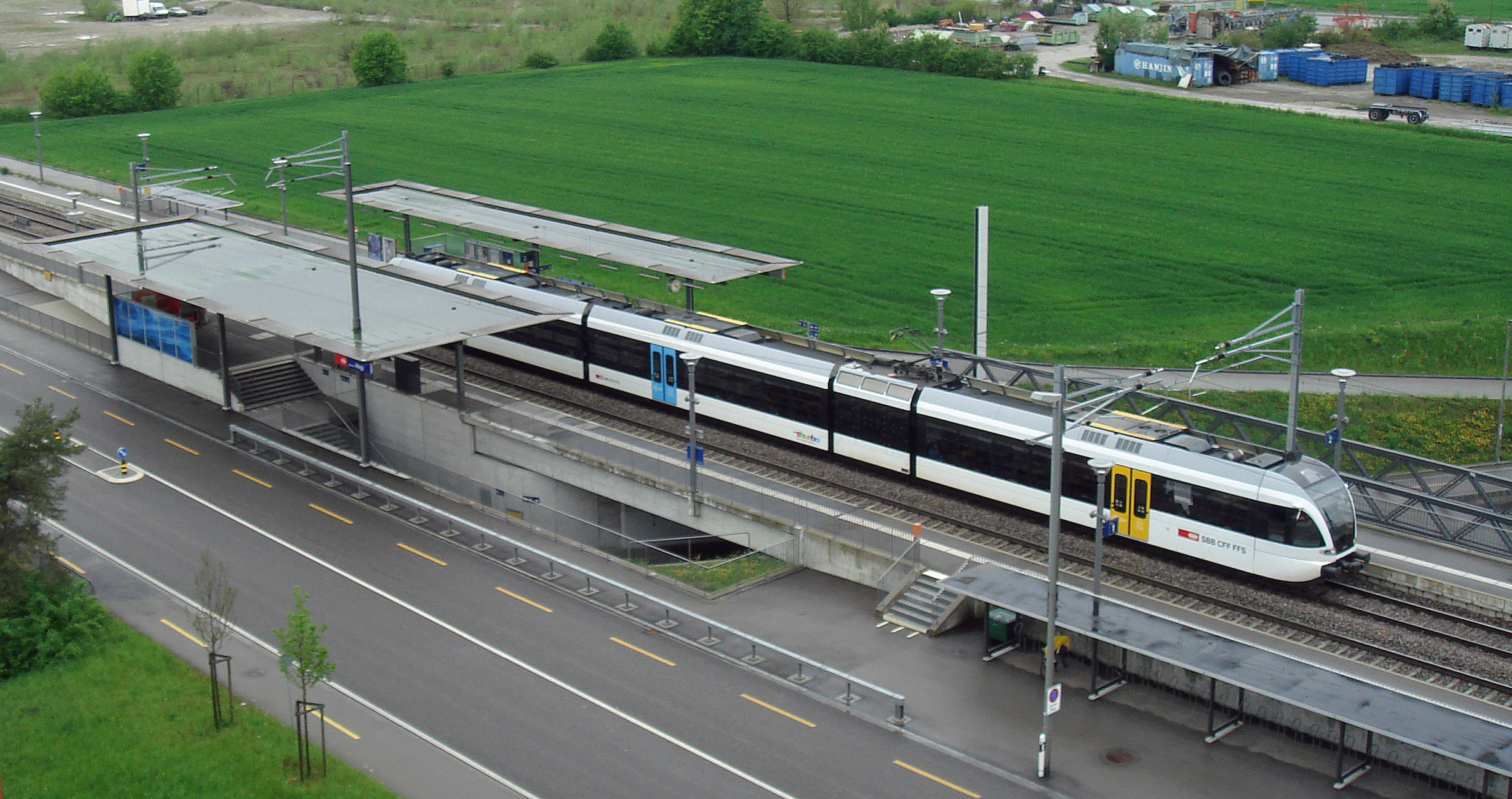
- A train leaves Winterthur Hegi

General information
- Location: Winterthur; Switzerland
- Coordinates: 47°30′06″N 8°46′09″E
- Elevation: 461 m (1,512 ft)
- Owner: Swiss Federal Railways
- Line: St. Gallen–Winterthur line
- Platforms: 2 side platforms
- Tracks: 2
- Train operators: Swiss Federal Railways; Thurbo

Other information
- Fare zone: 120 (ZVV)

Services
Preceding station	Zurich S-Bahn	Following station
Winterthur Grüze towards Brugg AG	S12	Räterschen towards Wil
Winterthur Grüze towards Winterthur	S35	Räterschen towards Wil
Preceding station	St. Gallen S-Bahn	Following station
Winterthur Grüze towards Winterthur	SN21 Limited service	Räterschen towards St. Gallen
Location
- Location within Switzerland Location within Canton of Zurich

Winterthur Hegi railway station (German: Bahnhof Winterthur Hegi) is a railway station in the municipality of Winterthur, in the Swiss canton of Zurich. It is an intermediate stop on the standard gauge St. Gallen–Winterthur line of Swiss Federal Railways.

Winterthur Hegi is one of ten railway stations in the city of Winterthur (fare zone 120 of ZVV), the others being: Oberwinterthur, Reutlingen, Sennhof-Kyburg, Winterthur, Winterthur Grüze, Winterthur Seen, Winterthur Töss, Winterthur Wallrüti, and Winterthur Wülflingen.

== Services ==
As of the December 2019 timetable change, the following services stop at Winterthur Hegi:

- Zurich S-Bahn: S12/S35: half-hourly service between Winterthur and Wil; the S12 continues from Winterthur to Brugg AG.

During weekends, Winterthur Hegi is served by a nighttime S-Bahn service (SN21), offered by Ostwind fare network, and operated by Thurbo for St. Gallen S-Bahn.

- St. Gallen S-Bahn SN21: hourly service to Winterthur and to St. Gallen (via Wil SG).

== See also ==
- Rail transport in Switzerland
