= Stadel (Winterthur) =

Statistical neighborhood of Winterthur

Coordinates: 47°32′3″N 8°45′41″E

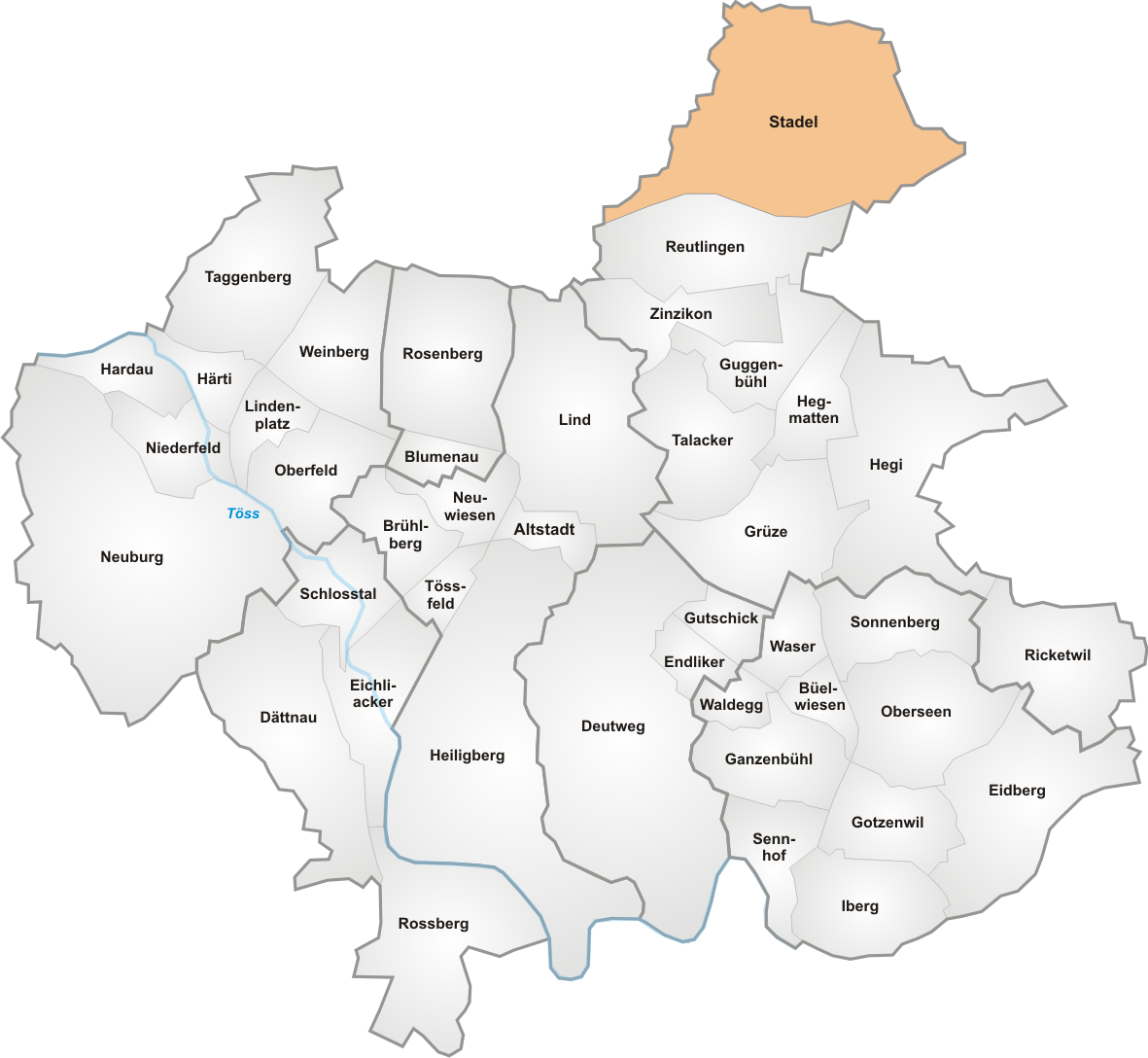
The quarter of Stadel in Winterthur

Stadel is a quarter in the district 2 (Oberwinterthur) of Winterthur.

It was formerly a part of Oberwinterthur municipality, which was incorporated into Winterthur in 1922.
