= Winterthur Töss railway station =

Railway station in Winterthur, Switzerland

Winterthur Töss
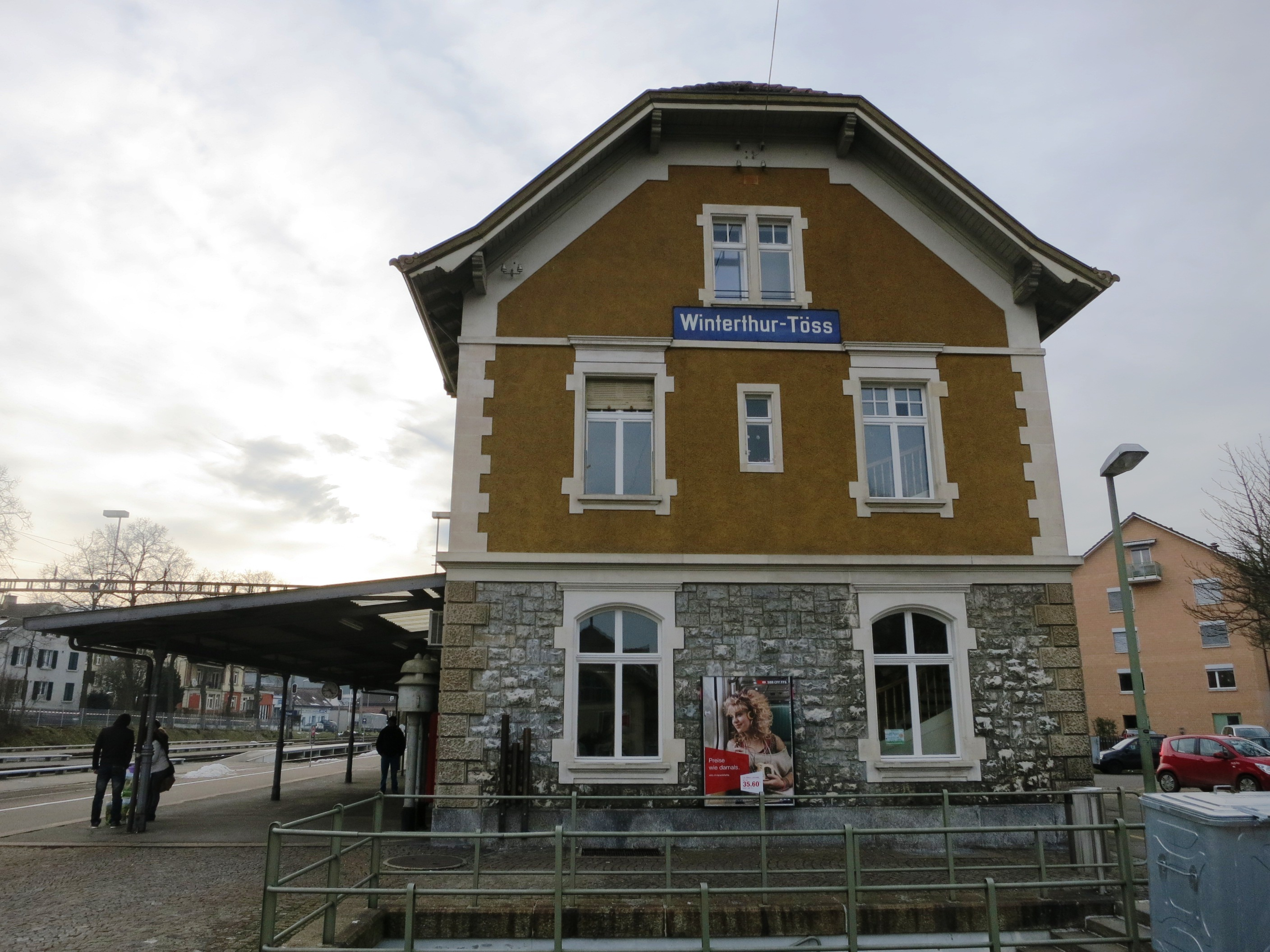

General information
- Location: Stationsstrasse; Töss; Winterthur, Zurich; Switzerland
- Coordinates: 47.489391°N 8.709701°E
- Elevation: 435 m (1,427 ft)
- Owner: Swiss Federal Railways
- Operator: Thurbo
- Line: Winterthur–Bülach–Koblenz

Other information
- Fare zone: 120 (ZVV)

Services
Preceding station	Zurich S-Bahn	Following station
Winterthur Wülflingen towards Bülach	S41	Winterthur Terminus
Winterthur Wülflingen towards Bülach	SN41 Limited service	Winterthur Terminus
Location
- Location within Switzerland Location within Canton of Zurich

Winterthur Töss railway station is a railway station in the city of Winterthur in the Swiss canton of Zurich. It takes its name from that city's quarter of Töss where it is located. The station is situated on the Winterthur to Koblenz via Bülach line.

It is one of ten railway stations in the city of Winterthur (fare zone 120 of ZVV), the others being: Oberwinterthur, Reutlingen, Sennhof-Kyburg, Winterthur, Winterthur Grüze, Winterthur Hegi, Winterthur Seen, Winterthur Wallrüti, and Winterthur Wülflingen.

== Services ==
Winterthur Töss is an intermediate stop on Zurich S-Bahn service S41, which links Winterthur main station and Bülach. As of the December 2023 timetable change, the following services exist:

- Zurich S-Bahn S41 Winterthur–Bülach (half-hourly service)

During weekends (Friday and Saturday night), there is also a Nighttime S-Bahn service (SN41) offered by ZVV.

- SN41: hourly service between Bülach and Winterthur.

== See also ==
- Rail transport in Switzerland
