= Reutlingen railway station =

Railway station in Winterthur, Switzerland

Reutlingen
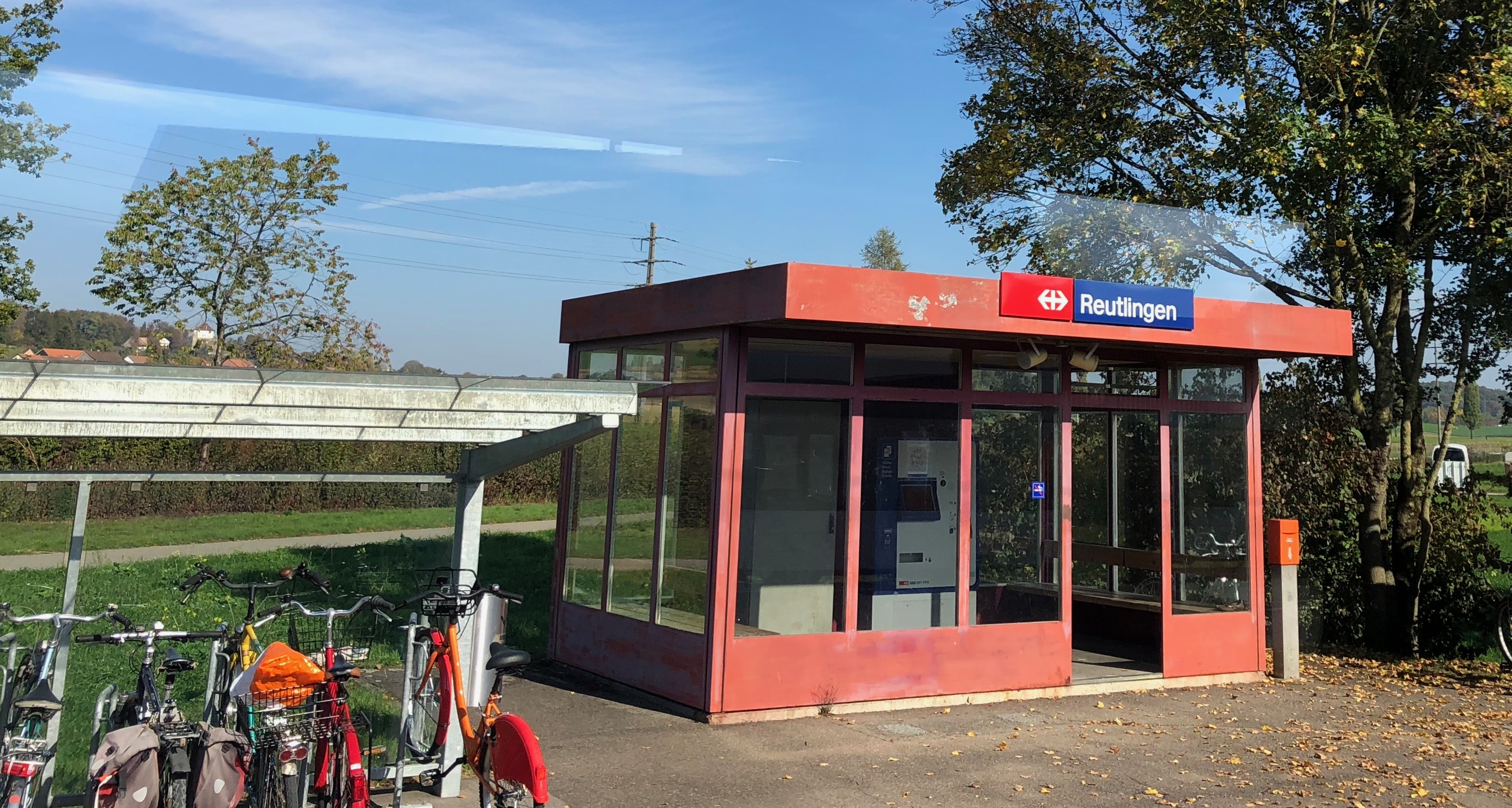
- The station in 2018

General information
- Location: Randbühlstrasse; Reutlingen; Winterthur, Zurich; Switzerland
- Coordinates: 47.529561°N 8.752477°E
- Elevation: 454 m (1,490 ft)
- Owner: Swiss Federal Railways
- Operator: Swiss Federal Railways; Thurbo
- Line: Winterthur–Etzwilen
- Platforms: 1 side platform
- Tracks: 1

Other information
- Fare zone: 120 (ZVV)

Services
Preceding station	Zurich S-Bahn	Following station
Winterthur Wallrüti towards Aarau	S11	Seuzach Terminus
Winterthur Wallrüti towards Winterthur	S29	Seuzach towards Stein am Rhein
Location
- Location within Switzerland Location within Canton of Zurich

Reutlingen is a railway station in the city of Winterthur in the canton of Zurich, Switzerland. It takes its name from that city's Reutlingen quarter, in which it is situated. The station is located on the Winterthur to Etzwilen line. It is one of ten railway stations in the city of Winterthur (fare zone 120 of ZVV), the others being: Oberwinterthur, Sennhof-Kyburg, Winterthur, Winterthur Grüze, Winterthur Hegi, Winterthur Seen, Winterthur Töss, Winterthur Wallrüti, and Winterthur Wülflingen.

== Services ==
The station is an intermediate stop on Zurich S-Bahn services S11, which links Aarau and Seuzach via Zurich, and the S29, which links Winterthur and Stein am Rhein.

As of the December 2023 timetable change, the following services exist:

- Zurich S-Bahn
  - S11: hourly service to Aarau via Winterthur and Zurich HB, and to Seuzach
  - S29: half-hourly service to Winterthur and to Stein am Rhein via Etzwilen

== See also ==
- Rail transport in Switzerland
