= Winterthur Grüze railway station =

Swiss railway station

Winterthur Grüze
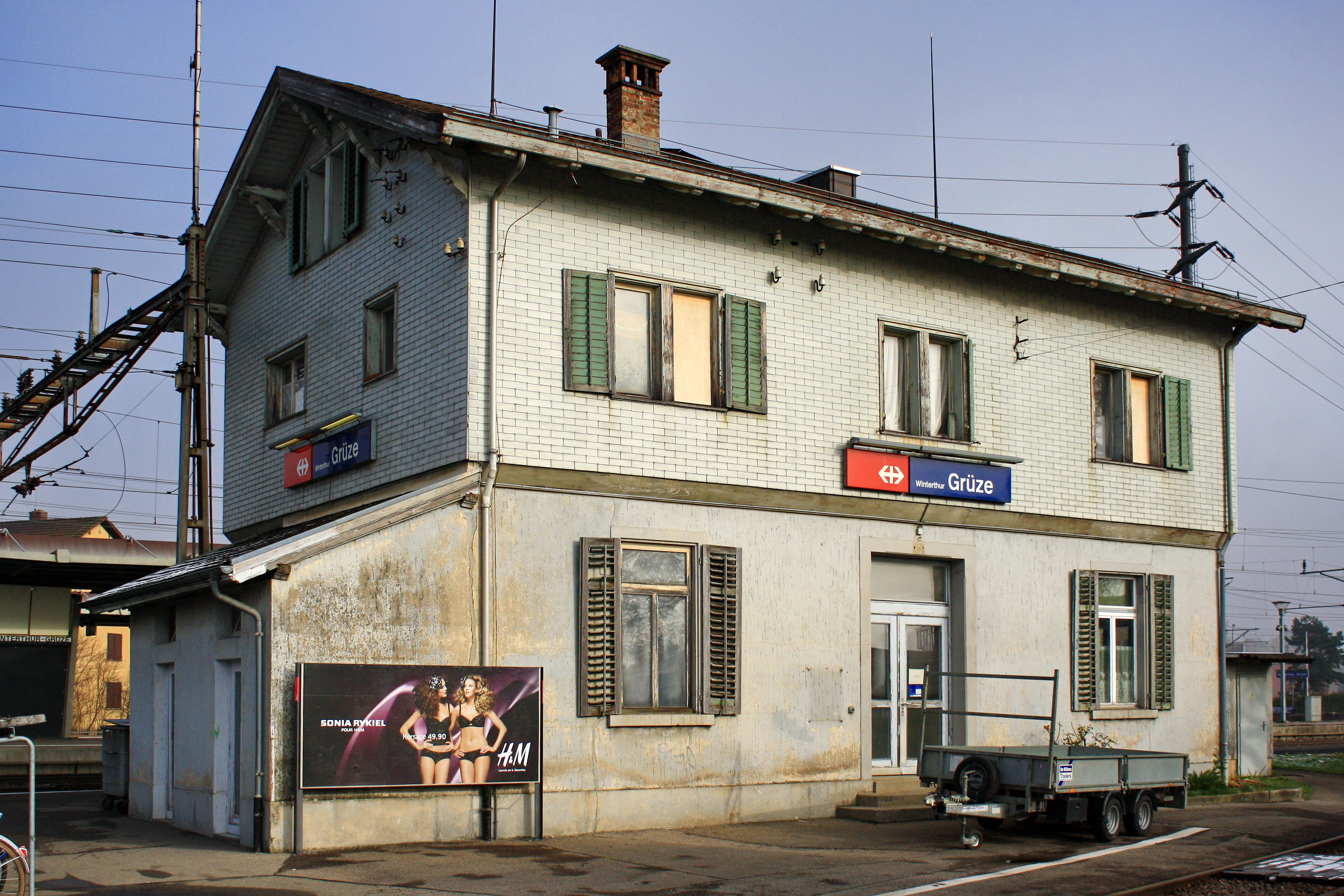
- The station building in 2009

General information
- Location: Sankt Gallerstrasse 143; Winterthur; Switzerland
- Coordinates: 47°29′56″N 8°45′04″E
- Elevation: 452 m (1,483 ft)
- Owner: Swiss Federal Railways
- Lines: St. Gallen–Winterthur line; Tösstal line
- Platforms: 2 island platforms
- Tracks: 9
- Train operators: Swiss Federal Railways; Thurbo

Other information
- Fare zone: 120 (ZVV)

History
- Opened: 14 October 1855

Services
Preceding station	Zurich S-Bahn	Following station
Winterthur towards Aarau	S11	Winterthur Seen towards Wila
Winterthur towards Brugg AG	S12	Winterthur Hegi towards Wil
Winterthur Terminus	S26	Winterthur Seen towards Rüti ZH
Winterthur Terminus	S35	Winterthur Hegi towards Wil
Preceding station	St. Gallen S-Bahn	Following station
Winterthur Terminus	SN21 Limited service	Winterthur Hegi towards St. Gallen
Location
- Location within Switzerland Location within Canton of Zurich

Winterthur Grüze railway station (German: Bahnhof Winterthur Grüze) is a railway station that serves Grüze, an industrial zone in district number 2 of the city of Winterthur in the canton of Zurich, Switzerland. It is one of ten railway stations in the city of Winterthur (fare zone 120 of ZVV), the others being: Oberwinterthur, Reutlingen, Sennhof-Kyburg, Winterthur, Winterthur Hegi, Winterthur Seen, Winterthur Töss, Winterthur Wallrüti, and Winterthur Wülflingen.

Opened in 1855, the station was built as a junction station and is the largest freight hub in Winterthur. It forms part of both the Tösstal line and the St. Gallen–Winterthur line. At the moment, it has no direct connection to the city bus (Stadtbus Winterthur) services, but the construction of a bridge above the station (to be opened in September 2026) will connect it to local bus routes in the future.

The roofs of the station platforms are listed buildings and are unique in Switzerland.

== Location ==
The station is situated roughly on the border between central Winterthur (to the west) and the Grüze industrial area (to the east).

== History ==
The station was built in 1855, and used for the first time on 14 October of that year for Sankt Gallisch-Appenzellische Eisenbahn scheduled service on the Winterthur–Wil railway. In 1875, the Tösstalbahn (TTB) was opened. Initially, due to its operator's lack of permission to enter Winterthur Hauptbahnhof, that line's termini were Grüze and Bauma.

It was not until 1882 that the operators of the Tösstalbahn could run trains to Winterthur Hauptbahnhof. For that purpose, a second track was created between Winterthur HB and Winterthur Grüze. The line from Winterthur HB to Räterschen (the next station towards Wil – St. Gallen), as well as the route to Tösstal (Winterthur HB – Winterthur Grüze – Winterthur Seen etc.) remained separated, without any connection between them.

With the commissioning of the new electrical signalling in 1953, the two tracks to Winterthur were connected with each other by a set of points (switches). Between Winterthur HB and Winterthur Grüze, double track operation was introduced. Räterschen railway station also received new signalling (integrated circuits) at that time.

Simultaneously, the main line (Winterthur – Winterthur Grüze – Räterschen – (Wil – St. Gallen)) was renovated, and the section between Winterthur Grüze and Räterschen converted to double track (the St. Gallen – Wil – Räterschen section had been built as a double track section right from the beginning).

Since the introduction of the Zürich S-Bahn in 1990, S12 trains travelling in both directions (towards Seen and Winterthur–Zürich, respectively) have stopped hourly at Grüze. Since November 2002, Grüze has been a self-service station and the signal box has been automatically remote controlled.

== Architecture ==
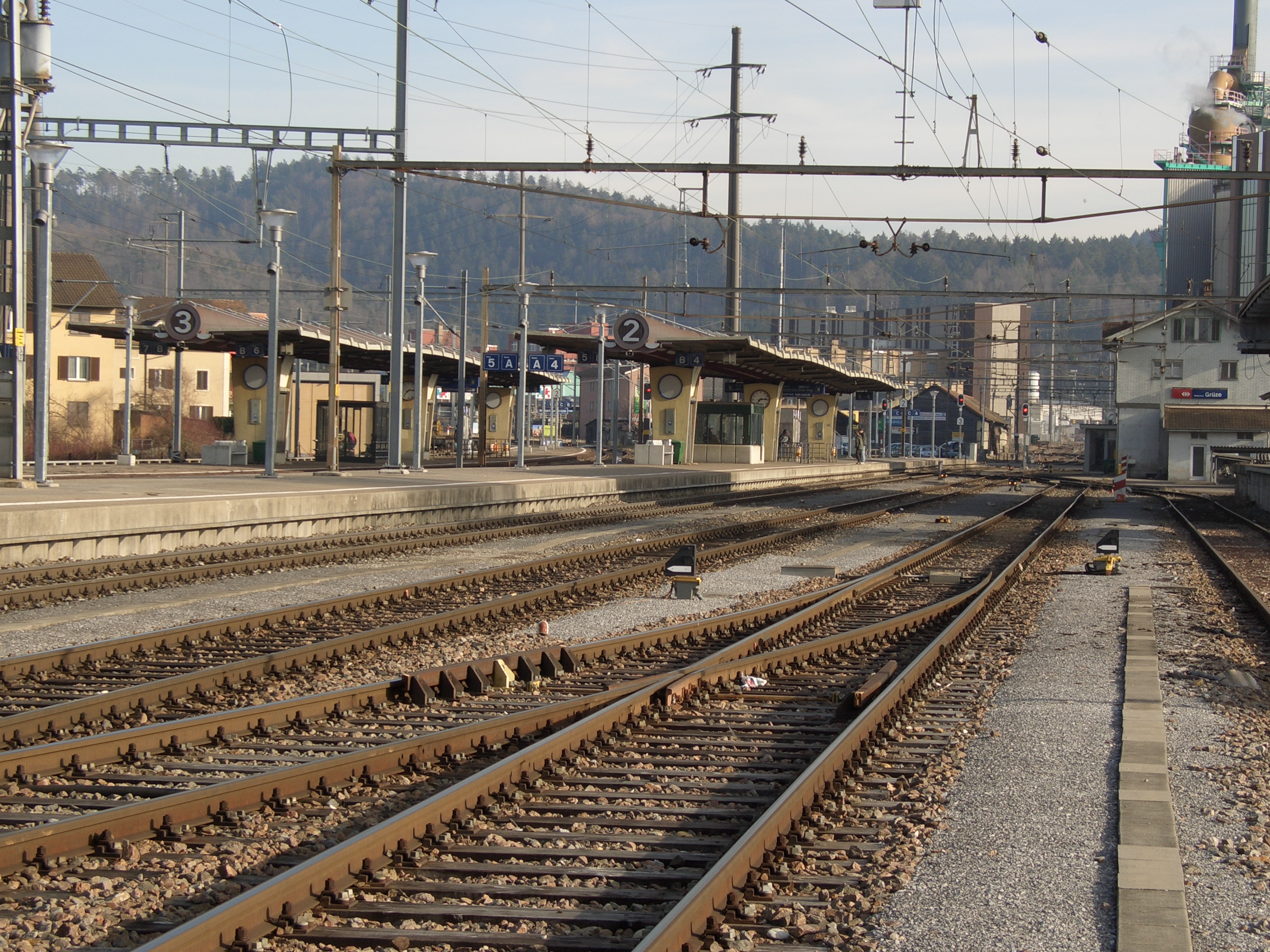
The station yard with its unique platform shelters, 2008.

The station has been a junction station ever since the construction of the Tösstalbahn. It is the point where the line from Winterthur HB separates into the lines to Wil and into the Tösstal, respectively. For that reason, tracks 4-7 are provided with platforms, each serving two tracks, one in each direction.

The other tracks, apart from one siding, are on the Tösstalbahn side of the line, and are used for goods traffic. As the station is located within the Grüze industrial area, it was formerly the scene of a lot of cargo handling. Even today, the station is one of the main SBB-CFF-FFS cargo hubs in the canton of Zürich.

The station's platform shelters, built in 1955, are listed buildings, and are unique in Switzerland. They were developed between 1952 and 1955 by the railway architect Hans Hilfiker, also the designer of the famous Swiss railway clock, as a prototype for new platform shelters. A special feature of these shelters is the central support tube with platform numbers at its ends, from which the cantilever roofs protrude on both sides. The new shelters, however, were never put into series production, and so Grüze remains the only station of its kind in Switzerland.

The station building is located on the southwestern side of all tracks at the station.

== Services ==
=== S-Bahn ===
The station is only called by S-Bahn services. It is an intermediate stop of four lines of the Zurich S-Bahn network.

- S12 Brugg AG–Zürich HB–Zürich Stettbach– Winterthur–Schaffhausen/Wil SG
  Operates non stop between Stettbach and Winterthur; the lines to Schaffhausen and Wil SG are operated alternately at hourly intervals. (only every hour; every half-hour from Winterthur HB to Schaffhausen)
- S11 Aarau–Lenzburg–Dietikon–Zürich HB–Zürich Stettbach–Winterthur–Seuzach/Sennhof-Kyburg (–Wila)
  Operates non stop between Stettbach and Winterthur; the lines to Seuzach and Sennhof-Kyburg are operated alternately at hourly intervals; supplementary trains to Wila. (only every hour; every half-hour from Winterthur HB to Seuzach)
- S26 Winterthur–Bauma–Rüti ZH
- S35 Winterthur–Wil SG

=== Nighttime trains ===
On weekends (Friday and Saturday night), there is a nighttime train (SN21) to Wil and St. Gallen, offered by Ostwind fare network, and operated by Thurbo for St. Gallen S-Bahn:

- SN21: Winterthur – Wil SG – St. Gallen

The Tösstal is served by night buses from Winterthur Hauptbahnhof and therefore has no night train.

== See also ==
- History of rail transport in Switzerland
- Rail transport in Switzerland
