= Rosenberg (Winterthur) =

Coordinates: 47°30′43.8″N 8°43′7.36″E

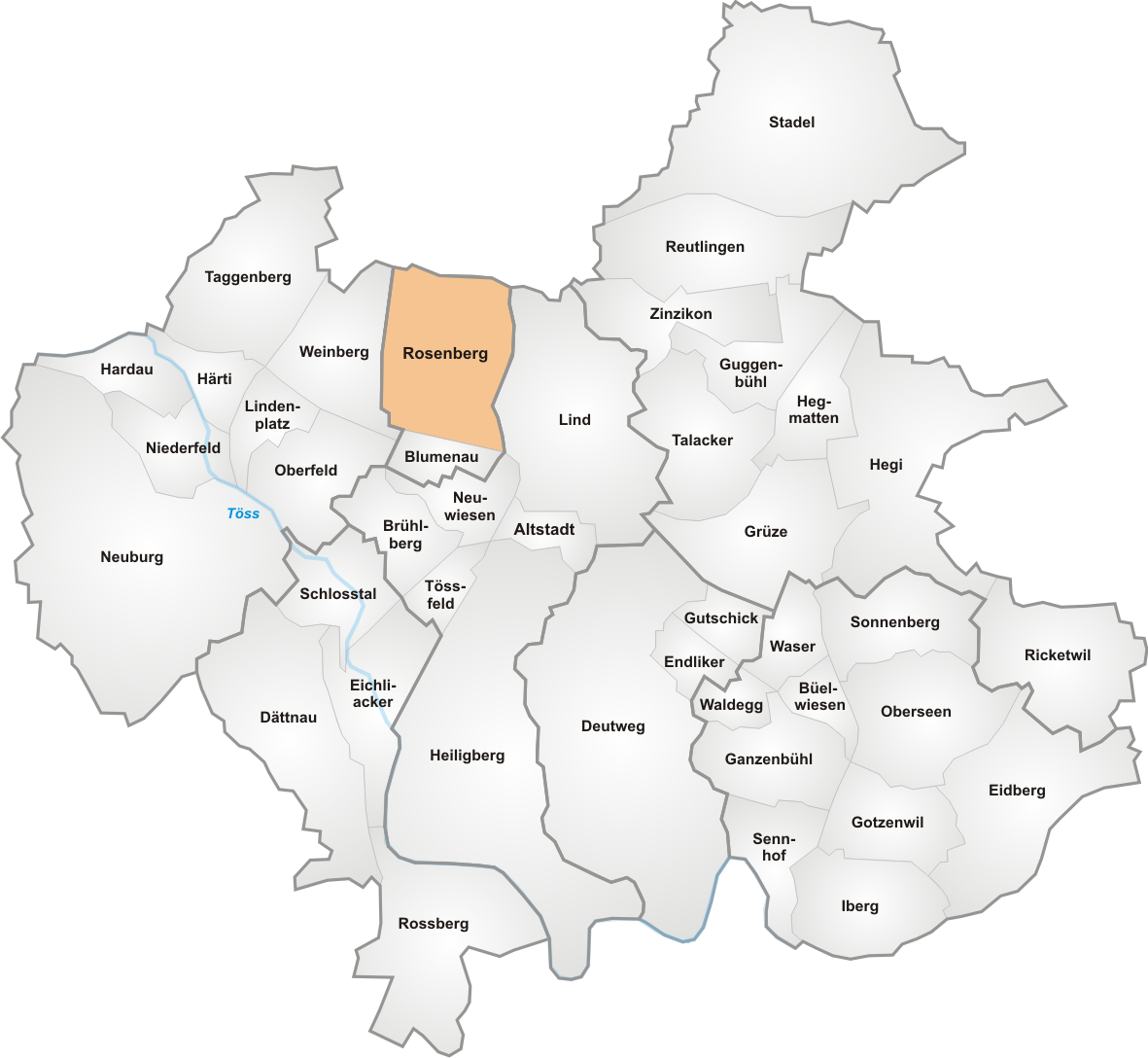
The quarter of Rosenberg in Winterthur

Rosenberg (Swiss Standard German pronunciation: [ˈroːzn̩bɛrɡ]) is a quarter in the district 5 (Veltheim) of Winterthur, Switzerland.

It was formerly a part of Veltheim municipality, which was incorporated into Winterthur in 1922.
