= Hofstetten, Zürich =

Hofstetten
- Former municipality
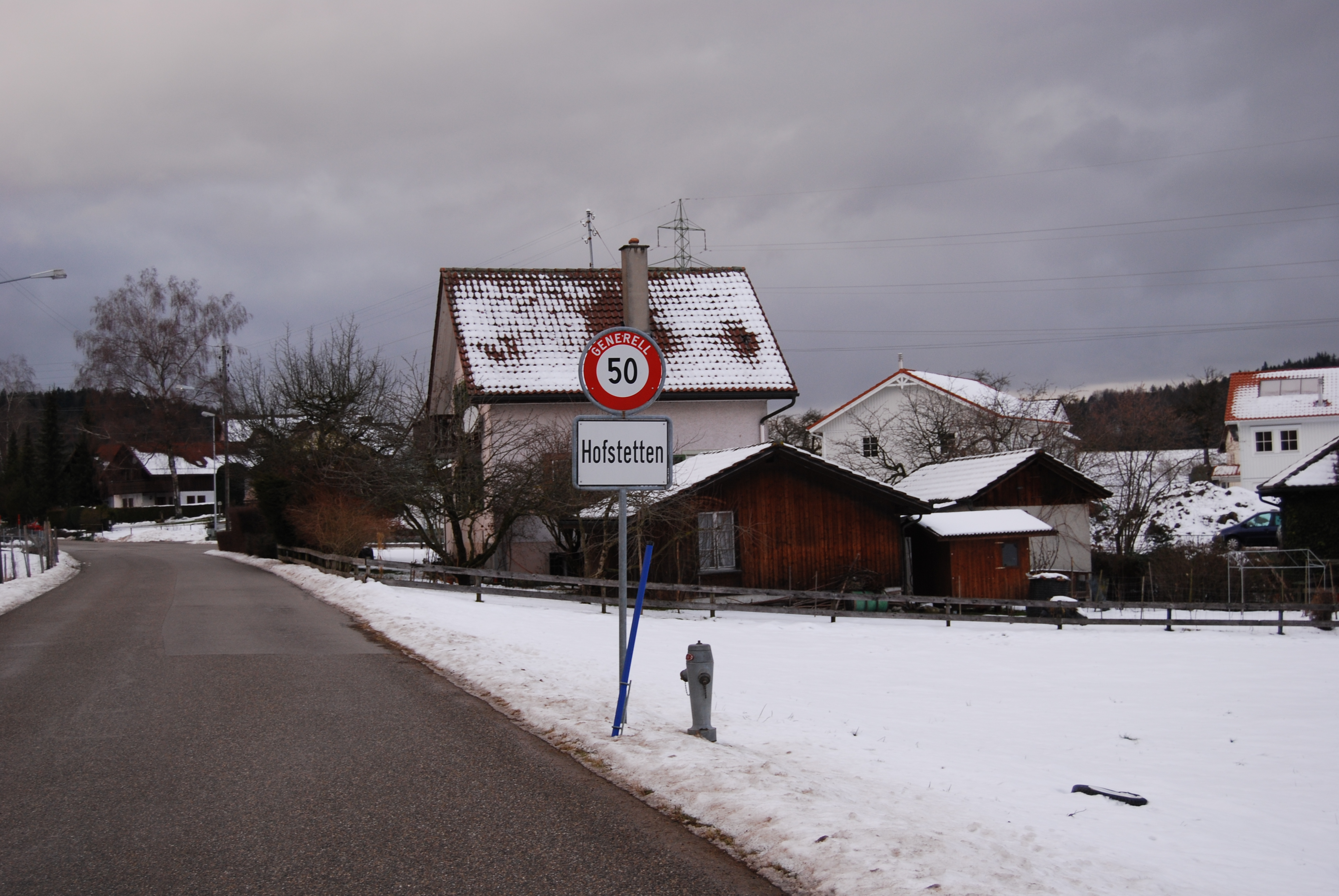

- Flag Coat of arms
- Location of Hofstetten
- Location within Switzerland Location within Canton of Zurich
- Coordinates: 47°28′N 8°51′E
- Country: Switzerland
- Canton: Zurich
- District: Winterthur

Area
  - Total: 8.85 km^{2} (3.42 sq mi)
- Elevation: 644 m (2,113 ft)

Population (December 2020)
  - Total: 500
  - Density: 56/km^{2} (150/sq mi)
- Time zone: UTC+01:00 (CET)
  - Summer (DST): UTC+02:00 (CEST)
- Postal code: 8354
- SFOS number: 222
- ISO 3166 code: CH-ZH
- Surrounded by: Aadorf (TG), Bichelsee-Balterswil (TG), Elgg, Elsau, Schlatt, Turbenthal
- Website: SFSO statistics

Hofstetten (German pronunciation: [hoːfˈʃtɛtn̩]) is a former municipality in the district of Winterthur in the canton of Zürich in Switzerland. On 1 January 2018 the former municipality of Hofstetten merged into the municipality of Elgg.

== History ==
Hofstetten is first mentioned in 914 as Pipineshovestetin. Until 2003 it was known as Hofstetten bei Elgg.

== Geography ==
Hofstetten has an area of 8.9 km^{2} (3.4 sq mi). Of this area, 49.9% is used for agricultural purposes, while 45.8% is forested. Of the rest of the land, 4.2% is settled (buildings or roads) and the remainder (0.1%) is non-productive (rivers, glaciers or mountains). In 1996 housing and buildings made up 2.1% of the total area, while transportation infrastructure made up the rest (2%). Of the total unproductive area, water (streams and lakes) made up 0.1% of the area. As of 2007 1.8% of the total municipal area was undergoing some type of construction.

The municipality is located between the Schauenberg and the Eulach river valley. It consists of the small villages of Hofstetten, Huggenberg, Geretswil, Wenzikon and Dickbuch.

== Demographics ==
Hofstetten has a population (as of 31 December 2020) of 500. As of 2007, 6.7% of the population was made up of foreign nationals. As of 2008 the gender distribution of the population was 51.8% male and 48.2% female. Over the last 10 years the population has grown at a rate of 0.5%. Most of the population (as of 2000) speaks German (98.6%), with French being second most common ( 0.5%) and Italian being third ( 0.2%).

In the 2007 election the most popular party was the SVP which received 62% of the vote. The next three most popular parties were the CSP (13.5%), the Green Party (8.2%) and the FDP (6.3%).

The age distribution of the population (as of 2000) is children and teenagers (0–19 years old) make up 30.3% of the population, while adults (20–64 years old) make up 55.8% and seniors (over 64 years old) make up 13.8%. The entire Swiss population is generally well educated. In Hofstetten about 81.5% of the population (between age 25-64) have completed either non-mandatory upper secondary education or additional higher education (either university or a Fachhochschule). There are 154 households in Hofstetten.

Hofstetten has an unemployment rate of 1.27%. As of 2005, there were 51 people employed in the primary economic sector and about 24 businesses involved in this sector. 31 people are employed in the secondary sector and there are 8 businesses in this sector. 25 people are employed in the tertiary sector, with 9 businesses in this sector. As of 2007 39.6% of the working population were employed full-time, and 60.4% were employed part-time.

As of 2008 there were 52 Catholics and 293 Protestants in Hofstetten. In the 2000 census, religion was broken down into several smaller categories. From the census, 77.6% were some type of Protestant, with 70.6% belonging to the Swiss Reformed Church and 6.9% belonging to other Protestant churches. 11.2% of the population were Catholic. Of the rest of the population, 0% were Muslim, 0.5% belonged to another religion (not listed), 0.2% did not give a religion, and 10% were atheist or agnostic.

The historical population is given in the following table:

year	population
1467	c. 90
1850	587
1900	478
1950	461
2000	419
