= Line 35 =

Line 35 may refer to:

- Line 35 (Beijing Subway), railway line in China
- S35 (ZVV), railway line in Switzerland
