= Elgg =

- Municipality
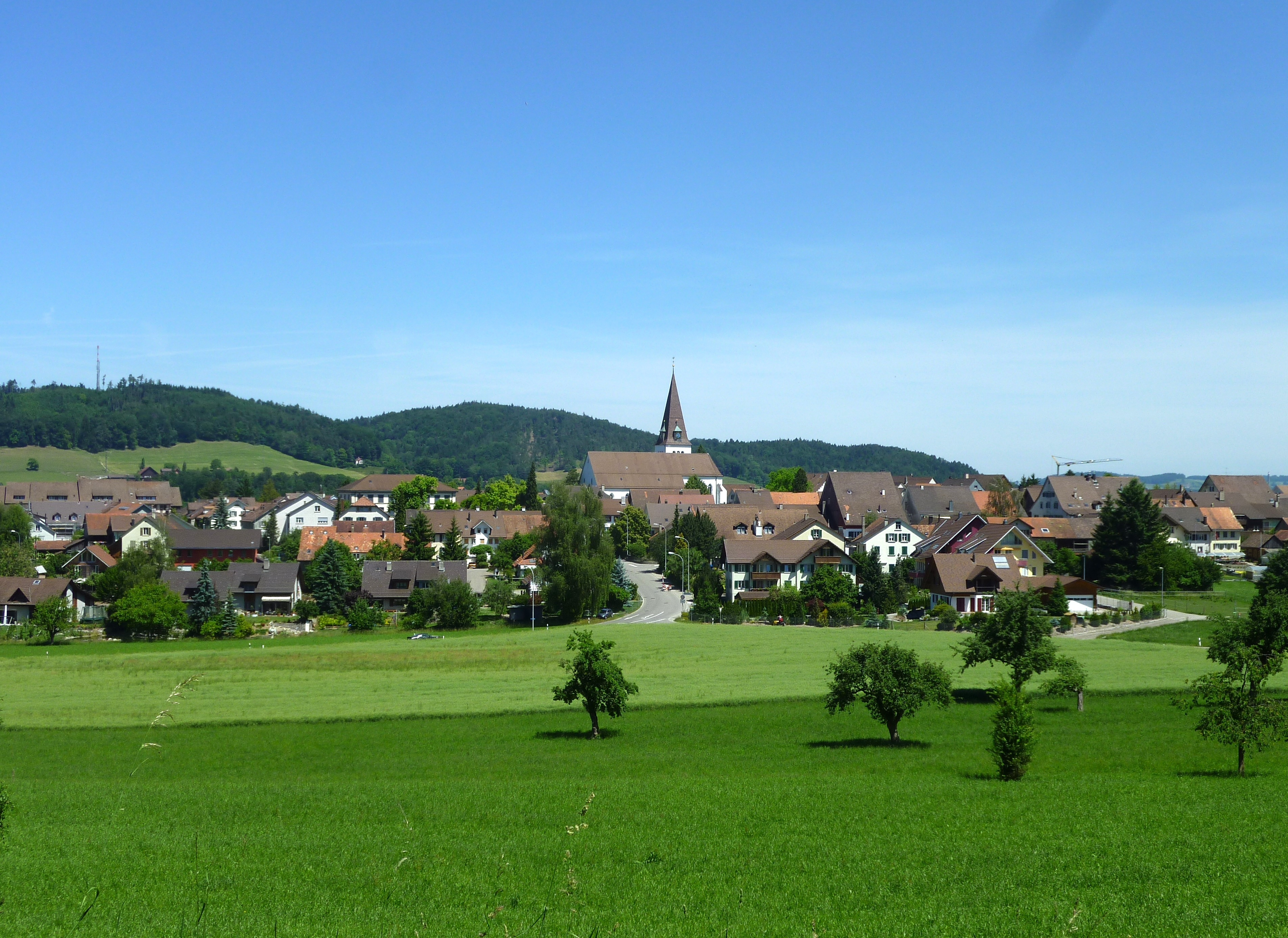

- Flag Coat of arms
- Location of Elgg
- Location within Switzerland Location within Canton of Zurich
- Coordinates: 47°29′N 8°52′E
- Country: Switzerland
- Canton: Zurich
- District: Winterthur

Area
  - Total: 15.53 km^{2} (6.00 sq mi)
- Elevation: 530 m (1,740 ft)
- Highest elevation (above Heurütiweiher): 825 m (2,707 ft)
- Lowest elevation: 494 m (1,621 ft)

Population (2018-12-31)
  - Total: 4,903
  - Density: 315.7/km^{2} (817.7/sq mi)
- Time zone: UTC+01:00 (CET)
  - Summer (DST): UTC+02:00 (CEST)
- Postal code: 8353
- SFOS number: 294
- ISO 3166 code: CH-ZH
- Surrounded by: Aadorf (TG), Bertschikon bei Attikon, Elsau, Hagenbuch, Hofstetten bei Elgg
- Twin towns: Wenigzell (Austria), Mafi Kumase (Ghana)
- Website: www.elgg.ch

Elgg is a municipality in the district of Winterthur in the canton of Zürich in Switzerland. On 1 January 2018 the former municipality of Hofstetten merged into the municipality of Elgg.

== History ==
Aerial view by Walter Mittelholzer (1920)

Elgg (Latin: Elgovia, Sacer pagus) is first mentioned between 760 and 763 as Ailaghoga. In 1166 it was mentioned as Elgoue and in 1370 as Elggaw.

== Äschli (Ash Wednesday custom) ==
Äschli, or in English Ash Wednesday custom, is a 500-year-old custom, which takes place on Ash Wednesday with the boys parade as its annual highlight. The origin lies in the pre-Reformation period, when musters were conducted for Elgg's Militia or mercenaries. The exact origin is unknown. However, it is mentioned in the 1628 parish priest Fasi book that the boys' parade in Elgg is a very old custom.

Aschermittwoch-Gesellschaft, which was founded in 1914 and currently has around 650 members, has committed themselves to this tradition.

Every year on New Year's young and old gathered at the Ober Tor, where the boys of Elgg, age 5-16, select in an open vote the respective Äschlihauptmann and the entire company.

From New Year until Ash Wednesday, exercises are then alternately held on Saturdays and Sundays.

== Geography ==
Elgg has an area of 15.6 km^{2} (6.0 sq mi). Of this area, 45.6% is used for agricultural purposes, while 41.6% is forested. Of the rest of the land, 12.3% is settled (buildings or roads) and the remainder (0.6%) is non-productive (rivers, glaciers or mountains). In 1996 housing and buildings made up 8% of the total area, while transportation infrastructure made up the rest (4.3%). Of the total unproductive area, water (streams and lakes) made up 0.3% of the area. As of 2007 7.9% of the total municipal area was undergoing some type of construction.

The village is overlooked by Elgg Castle, which is a Swiss heritage site of national significance.

== Demographics ==
Elgg has a population (as of 31 December 2020) of 4,960. As of 2007, 12.8% of the population was made up of foreign nationals. As of 2008 the gender distribution of the population was 49.7% male and 50.3% female. Over the last 10 years the population has grown at a rate of 4.7%. Most of the population (as of 2000) speaks German (90.8%), with Albanian being second most common (3.0%) and Italian being third (2.3%).

In the 2007 election the most popular party was the SVP which received 39.4% of the vote. The next three most popular parties were the SPS (16.8%), the CSP (12.8%) and the FDP (11%).

The age distribution of the population (as of 2000) is children and teenagers (0–19 years old) make up 24.7% of the population, while adults (20–64 years old) make up 59.6% and seniors (over 64 years old) make up 15.7%. In Elgg about 79.1% of the population (between age 25-64) have completed either non-mandatory upper secondary education or additional higher education (either university or a Fachhochschule). There are 1502 households in Elgg.

Elgg has an unemployment rate of 1.98%. As of 2005, there were 104 people employed in the primary economic sector and about 30 businesses involved in this sector. 471 people are employed in the secondary sector and there are 46 businesses in this sector. 742 people are employed in the tertiary sector, with 112 businesses in this sector. As of 2007 48.8% of the working population were employed full-time, and 51.2% were employed part-time.

As of 2008 there were 825 Catholics and 1959 Protestants in Elgg. In the 2000 census, religion was broken down into several smaller categories. From the census, 58.1% were some type of Protestant, with 54% belonging to the Swiss Reformed Church and 4.2% belonging to other Protestant churches. 22.5% of the population were Catholic. Of the rest of the population, 0% were Muslim, 6.9% belonged to another religion (not listed), 3.5% did not give a religion, and 8.7% were atheist or agnostic.

The historical population is given in the following table:

year	population
1467	c. 440
1634	1,018
1792	2,103
1836	1,038
1850	1,182
1900	1,420
1950	2,184
2000	3,593

== Transport ==
Elgg railway station is a stop of the Zürich S-Bahn on the line S35.

== Notable people ==
- Heinrich Schweizer-Sidler (1815 in Elgg – 1894) a Swiss philologist
- Bruno Wolfer (born 1954 in Elgg) a Swiss former cyclist
- Jacqueline Fehr (born 1963) a Swiss politician, sits on the Swiss National Council, brought up in Elgg
