= Ellikon =

Ellikon may refer to several places in the canton of Zurich, Switzerland:

- Ellikon an der Thur, a municipality
- Ellikon am Rhein in the municipality of Marthalen
