= Elsau =

- Municipality
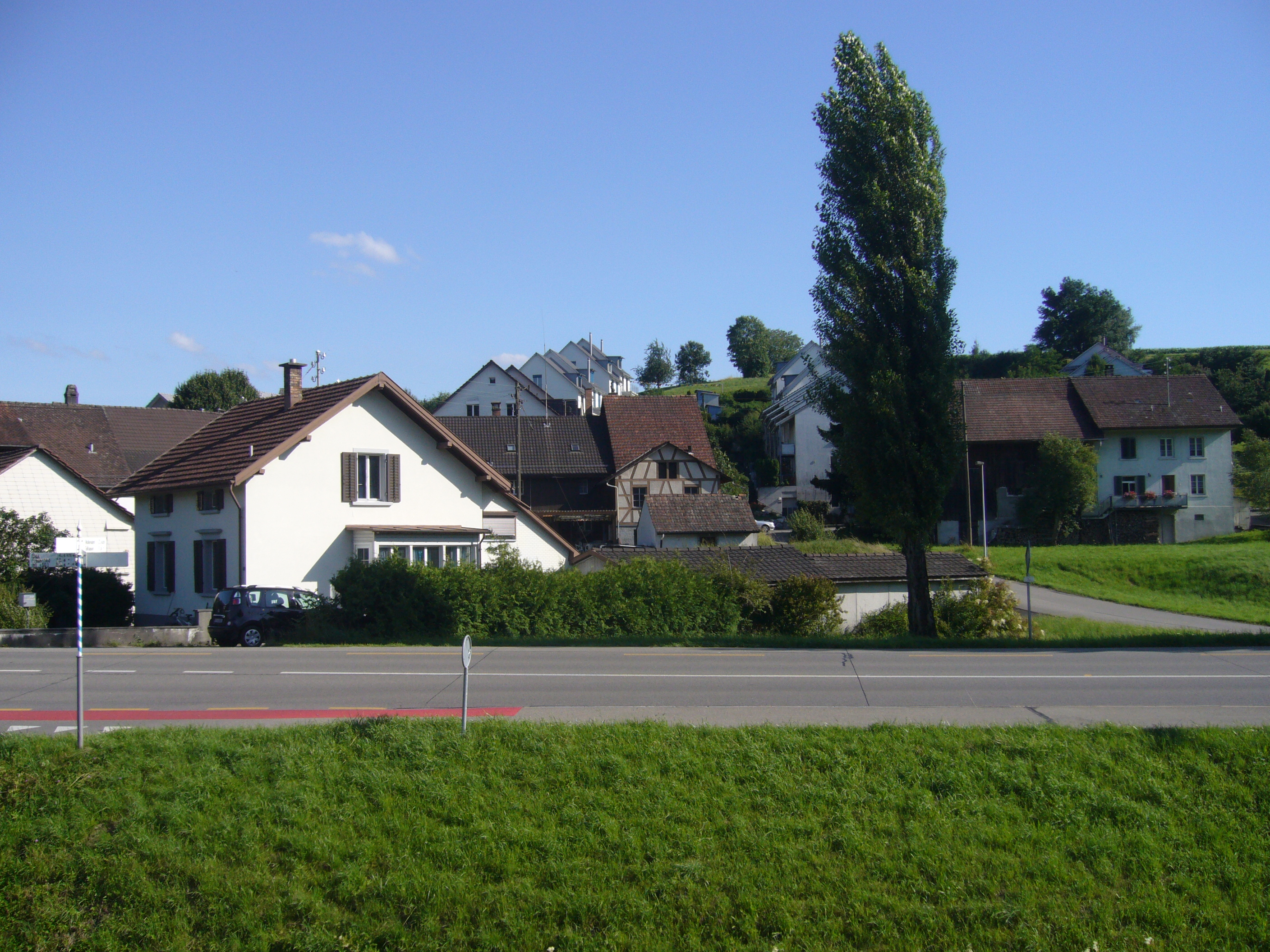

- Flag Coat of arms
- Location of Elsau
- Location within Switzerland Location within Canton of Zurich
- Coordinates: 47°30′N 8°48′E
- Country: Switzerland
- Canton: Zurich
- District: Winterthur

Area
  - Total: 8.06 km^{2} (3.11 sq mi)
- Elevation: 498 m (1,634 ft)
- Highest elevation (Geitberg): 610 m (2,000 ft)
- Lowest elevation (Rümikon): 466 m (1,529 ft)

Population (December 2020)
  - Total: 3,657
  - Density: 454/km^{2} (1,180/sq mi)
- Time zone: UTC+01:00 (CET)
  - Summer (DST): UTC+02:00 (CEST)
- Postal code: 8352
- SFOS number: 219
- ISO 3166 code: CH-ZH
- Surrounded by: Bertschikon bei Attikon, Elgg, Hofstetten bei Elgg, Schlatt, Wiesendangen, Winterthur
- Website: www.elsau.ch

Elsau is a municipality in the district of Winterthur in the canton of Zürich in Switzerland.

== History ==
Aerial view by Walter Mittelholzer (1918-1937)

Elsau is first mentioned in 1043 as Elnesouva. On 23 April 1398 Count Donat von Toggenburg, Herr zu Brettengow und Tavas donated the church of Elsow as benefice for the new Allerheiligenaltar at the grave of the Toggenburg family in the Rüti Monastery, for the salvation of the soul of his daughter Menta von Toggenburg who died shortly before, as well as further lands and goods in the present Weinland district of the canton of Zürich, confirmed among others by Ruodolf von Bonstetten from Ustra.

== Geography ==
Elsau has an area of 8 km^{2} (3.1 sq mi). Of this area, 56.5% is used for agricultural purposes, while 25.7% is forested. Of the rest of the land, 17.2% is settled (buildings or roads) and the remainder (0.6%) is non-productive (rivers, glaciers or mountains). In 1996 housing and buildings made up 10.9% of the total area, while transportation infrastructure made up the rest (6.1%). Of the total unproductive area, water (streams and lakes) made up 0.5% of the area. As of 2007 15.4% of the total municipal area was undergoing some type of construction.

The municipality is located along both banks of the Eulach river. It consists of the villages of Elsau, Rümikon (mentioned in 829 as Rumaninchovun), Räterschen and since 1922 the villages of Unter- and Oberschottikon.

== Demographics ==
Elsau has a population (as of 31 December 2020) of 3,657. As of 2007, 11.9% of the population was made up of foreign nationals. As of 2008 the gender distribution of the population was 50.1% male and 49.9% female. Over the last 10 years the population has grown at a rate of 14.5%. Most of the population (as of 2000) speaks German (93.0%), with Italian being second most common (1.3%) and Albanian being third (1.3%).

In the 2007 election the most popular party was the SVP which received 39.5% of the vote. The next three most popular parties were the SPS (17.4%), the FDP (14.7%) and the CSP (10.5%).

The age distribution of the population (as of 2000) is children and teenagers (0–19 years old) make up 25.4% of the population, while adults (20–64 years old) make up 61.4% and seniors (over 64 years old) make up 13.2%. The entire Swiss population is generally well educated. In Elsau about 80.2% of the population (between age 25-64) have completed either non-mandatory upper secondary education or additional higher education (either university or a Fachhochschule). There are 1143 households in Elsau.

Elsau has an unemployment rate of 2.33%. As of 2005, there were 67 people employed in the primary economic sector and about 26 businesses involved in this sector. 237 people are employed in the secondary sector and there are 42 businesses in this sector. 464 people are employed in the tertiary sector, with 102 businesses in this sector. As of 2007 55.2% of the working population were employed full-time, and 44.8% were employed part-time.

As of 2008 there were 817 Catholics and 1633 Protestants in Elsau. In the 2000 census, religion was broken down into several smaller categories. From the census, 59.7% were some type of Protestant, with 56.1% belonging to the Swiss Reformed Church and 3.6% belonging to other Protestant churches. 23.7% of the population were Catholic. Of the rest of the population, 0% were Muslim, 4.3% belonged to another religion (not listed), 2.4% did not give a religion, and 9.6% were atheist or agnostic.

The historical population is given in the following table:

year	population
1467	c. 60
1634	188
1771	479
1836	896
1850	909
1900	1,047
1950	1,348
1960	1,972
2000	2,900

== Transport ==
The railway stations of Räterschen and Schottikon both lie within the municipality of Elsau. Both stations are stops on line S35 of the Zürich S-Bahn.
