= Bertschikon =

Bertschikon may refer to:

- Bertschikon bei Attikon, a municipality in the Swiss canton of Zürich
- Bertschikon bei Gossau, a settlement in the municipality of Gossau in the Swiss canton of Zürich
