= Aadorf railway station =

Swiss railway station

Aadorf
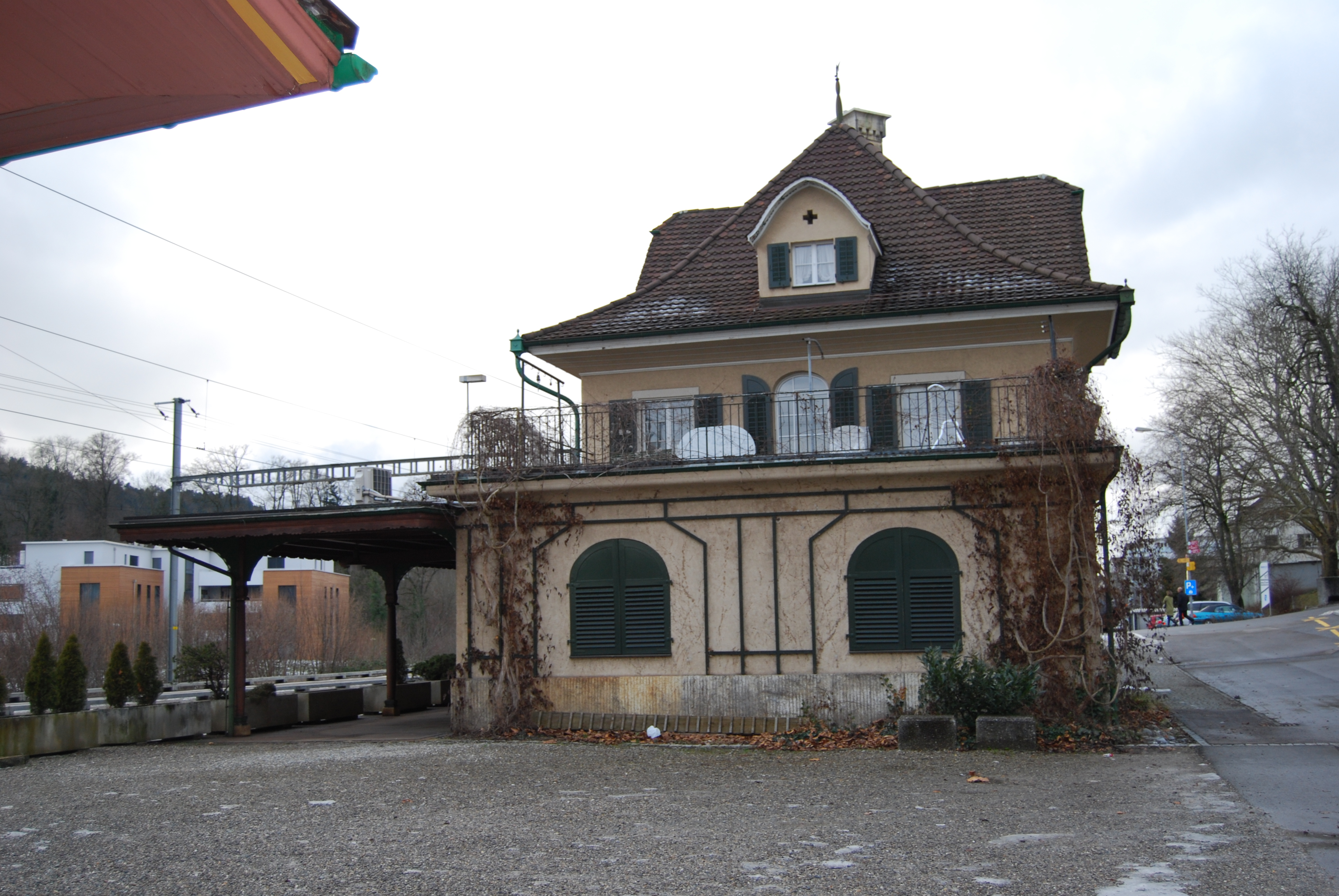
- The station building in 2010

General information
- Location: Aadorf; Switzerland
- Coordinates: 47°29′17″N 8°54′12″E
- Elevation: 527 m (1,729 ft)
- Owner: Swiss Federal Railways
- Line: St. Gallen–Winterthur line
- Train operators: Swiss Federal Railways; Thurbo

Other information
- Fare zone: 917 (Tarifverbund Ostwind)

Services
Preceding station	Zurich S-Bahn	Following station
Elgg towards Brugg AG	S12	Guntershausen towards Wil
Elgg towards Winterthur	S35	Guntershausen towards Wil
Preceding station	St. Gallen S-Bahn	Following station
Elgg towards Winterthur	SN21 Limited service	Guntershausen towards St. Gallen
Location
- Location within Switzerland Location within Canton of Thurgau

Aadorf railway station (German: Bahnhof Aadorf) is a railway station in the municipality of Aadorf, in the Swiss canton of Thurgau. It is an intermediate stop on the standard gauge St. Gallen–Winterthur line of Swiss Federal Railways. It is located within fare zone 917 of the Ostwind tariff network.

== Services ==
The following services stop at Aadorf:

- Zurich S-Bahn: S12/S35: half-hourly service between Winterthur and Wil; the S12 continues from Winterthur to Brugg AG.

During weekends, the station is served by a nighttime S-Bahn service (SN21), offered by Ostwind fare network, and operated by Thurbo for St. Gallen S-Bahn.

- St. Gallen S-Bahn SN21: hourly service to Winterthur and to St. Gallen (via Wil SG).

== See also ==
- Rail transport in Switzerland
