= Sirnach railway station =

Swiss railway station

Sirnach
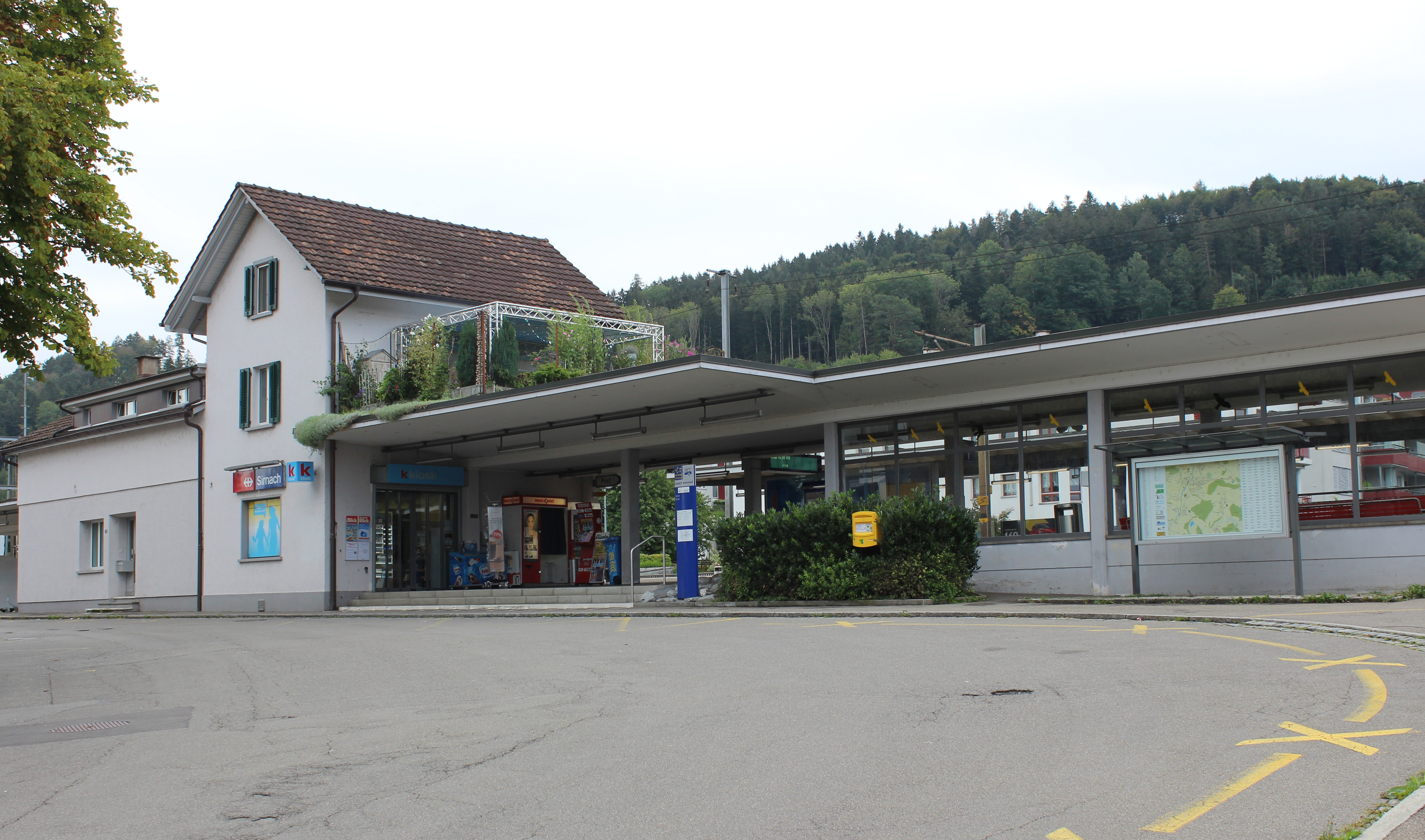
- The station building in 2018

General information
- Location: Sirnach; Switzerland
- Coordinates: 47°27′43″N 9°00′02″E
- Elevation: 549 m (1,801 ft)
- Owner: Swiss Federal Railways
- Line: St. Gallen–Winterthur line
- Train operators: Swiss Federal Railways; Thurbo

Other information
- Fare zone: 915 (Tarifverbund Ostwind)

Services
Preceding station	Zurich S-Bahn	Following station
Eschlikon towards Brugg AG	S12	Wil Terminus
Eschlikon towards Winterthur	S35	Wil Terminus
Preceding station	St. Gallen S-Bahn	Following station
Eschlikon towards Winterthur	SN21 Limited service	Wil towards St. Gallen
Location
- Location within Switzerland Location within Canton of Thurgau

Sirnach railway station (German: Bahnhof Sirnach) is a railway station in the municipality of Sirnach, in the Swiss canton of Thurgau. It is an intermediate stop on the standard gauge St. Gallen–Winterthur line of Swiss Federal Railways. The station is located within fare zone 915 of the Ostwind tariff network.

== Services ==
The following services stop at Sirnach:

- Zurich S-Bahn: S12/S35: half-hourly service between Winterthur and Wil; the S12 continues from Winterthur to Brugg AG.

During weekends, the station is served by a nighttime S-Bahn service (SN21), offered by Ostwind fare network, and operated by Thurbo for St. Gallen S-Bahn.

- St. Gallen S-Bahn SN21: hourly service to Winterthur and to St. Gallen (via Wil SG).

== See also ==
- Rail transport in Switzerland
