= Winterthur District =

Coordinates: 47°30′N 8°46′E

Winterthur District Bezirk Winterthur
- District
- Flag Coat of arms
- Country: Switzerland
- Canton: Zürich
- Capital: Winterthur

Area
  - Total: 251.25 km^{2} (97.01 sq mi)

Population (31 December 2020)
  - Total: 173,053
  - Density: 688.77/km^{2} (1,783.9/sq mi)
- Time zone: UTC+1 (CET)
  - Summer (DST): UTC+2 (CEST)
- Municipalities: 19

Winterthur District is one of the twelve districts of the German-speaking canton of Zürich, Switzerland. It has a population of 173,053 (as of 31 December 2020). Its capital is the city of Winterthur.

== Municipalities ==
Winterthur District contains a total of 19 municipalities:

| Coat of arms | Municipality | Population (31 December 2020) | Area, km^{2} |
|---|---|---|---|
| Altikon | Altikon | 701 | 7.68 |
| Brütten | Brütten | 2,063 | 6.67 |
| Dägerlen | Dägerlen | 1,037 | 7.90 |
| Dättlikon | Dättlikon | 797 | 2.87 |
| Dinhard | Dinhard | 1,741 | 7.15 |
| Elgg | Elgg | 4,960 | 15.53 |
| Ellikon an der Thur | Ellikon an der Thur | 936 | 4.92 |
| Elsau | Elsau | 3,657 | 8.06 |
| Hagenbuch | Hagenbuch | 1,095 | 8.17 |
| Hettlingen | Hettlingen | 3,101 | 5.87 |
| Neftenbach | Neftenbach | 5,756 | 14.95 |
| Pfungen | Pfungen | 3,948 | 4.99 |
| Rickenbach | Rickenbach | 2,796 | 6.03 |
| Schlatt | Schlatt | 779 | 9.03 |
| Seuzach | Seuzach | 7,420 | 7.56 |
| Turbenthal | Turbenthal | 4,983 | 25.07 |
| Wiesendangen | Wiesendangen | 6,633 | 19.17 |
| Winterthour | Winterthur | 114,220 | 67.93 |
| Zell (Zurich) | Zell | 6,430 | 12.70 |
| Total | | 173,053 | 251.25 |

== Mergers ==
On 1 January 2014 the former municipality of Bertschikon merged into the municipality of Wiesendangen.

On 1 January 2018 the former municipality of Hofstetten merged into the municipality of Elgg.

== See also ==
- Municipalities of the canton of Zürich
