= Eschlikon railway station =

Swiss railway station

Eschlikon
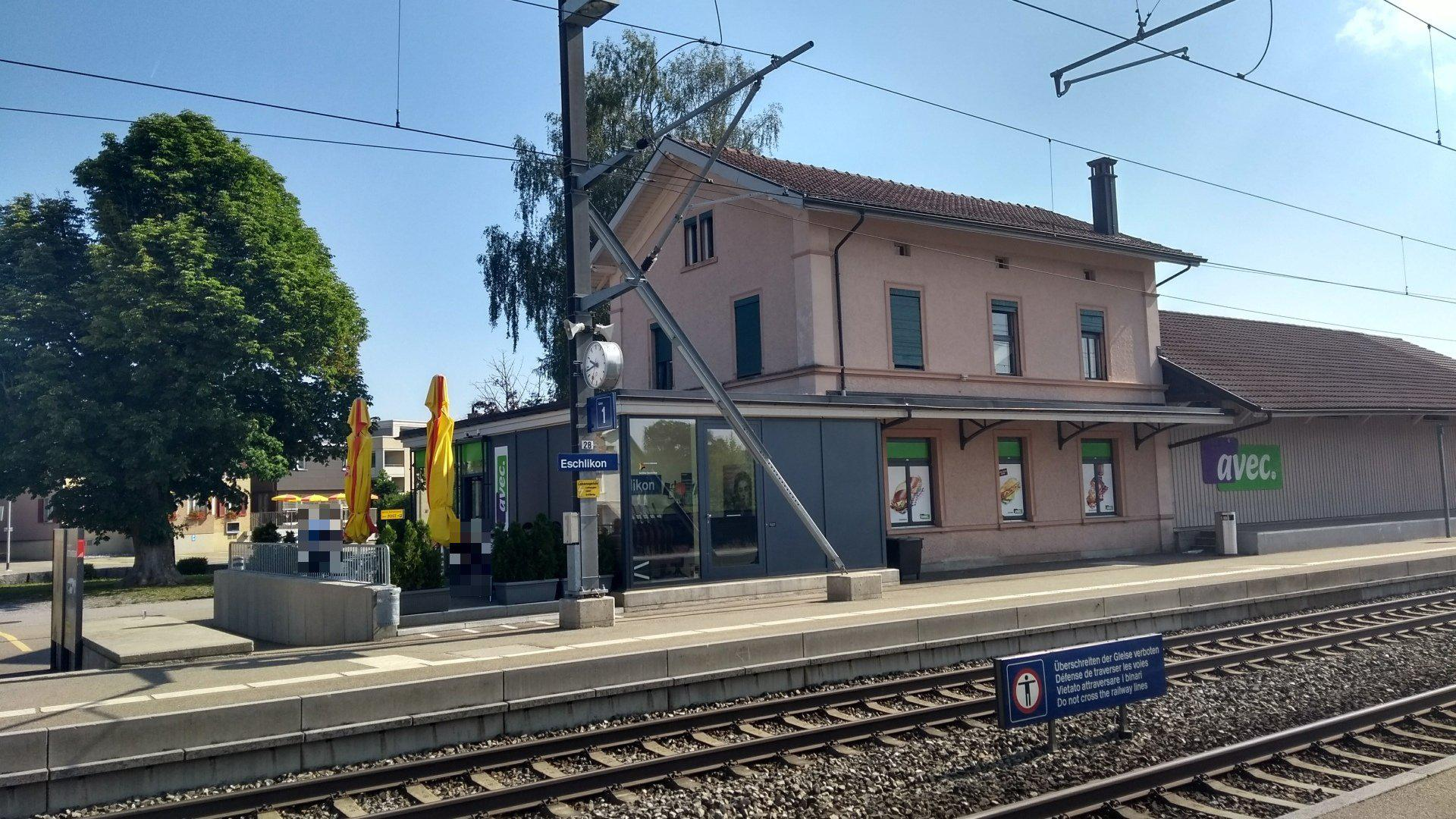
- The station building in 2018

General information
- Location: Eschlikon; Switzerland
- Coordinates: 47°27′41″N 8°57′31″E
- Elevation: 566 m (1,857 ft)
- Owner: Swiss Federal Railways
- Line: St. Gallen–Winterthur line
- Train operators: Swiss Federal Railways; Thurbo

Other information
- Fare zone: 915 / 917 (Tarifverbund Ostwind)

Services
Preceding station	Zurich S-Bahn	Following station
Guntershausen towards Brugg AG	S12	Sirnach towards Wil
Guntershausen towards Winterthur	S35	Sirnach towards Wil
Preceding station	St. Gallen S-Bahn	Following station
Guntershausen towards Winterthur	SN21 Limited service	Sirnach towards St. Gallen
Location
- Location within Switzerland Location within Canton of Thurgau

Eschlikon railway station (German: Bahnhof Eschlikon) is a railway station in the municipality of Eschlikon, in the Swiss canton of Thurgau. It is an intermediate stop on the standard gauge St. Gallen–Winterthur line of Swiss Federal Railways. The station is located on the border of fare zones 915 and 917 of the Ostwind tariff network.

== Services ==
The following services stop at Eschlikon:

- Zurich S-Bahn: S12/S35: half-hourly service between Winterthur and Wil; the S12 continues from Winterthur to Brugg AG.

During weekends, the station is served by a nighttime S-Bahn service (SN21), offered by Ostwind fare network, and operated by Thurbo for St. Gallen S-Bahn.

- St. Gallen S-Bahn SN21: hourly service to Winterthur and to St. Gallen (via Wil SG).

== See also ==
- Rail transport in Switzerland
