= Räterschen railway station =

Swiss railway station

Räterschen
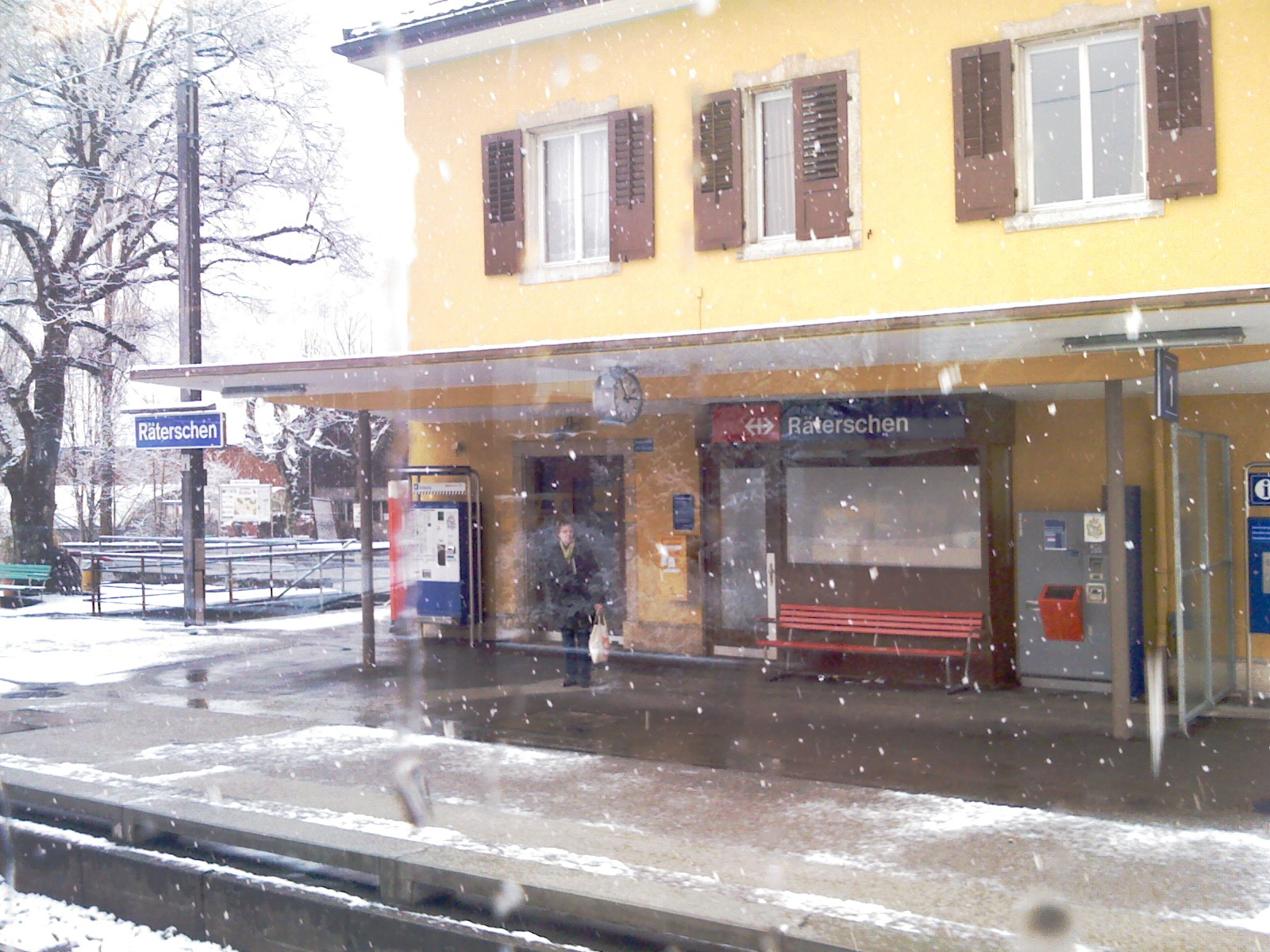
- The station building in 2008

General information
- Location: Elsau; Switzerland
- Coordinates: 47°29′55″N 8°47′42″E
- Elevation: 475 m (1,558 ft)
- Owner: Swiss Federal Railways
- Line: St. Gallen–Winterthur line
- Train operators: Swiss Federal Railways; Thurbo

Other information
- Fare zone: 164 (ZVV)

Services
| Preceding station | Zurich S-Bahn | Following station |
|---|---|---|
| Winterthur Hegi towards Brugg AG | S12 | Schottikon towards Wil |
| Winterthur Hegi towards Winterthur | S35 | Schottikon towards Wil |
| Preceding station | St. Gallen S-Bahn | Following station |
| Winterthur Hegi towards Winterthur | SN21 Limited service | Schottikon towards St. Gallen |
Location
- Location within Switzerland Location within Canton of Zurich

Räterschen is a railway station in the Swiss canton of Zurich and municipality of Elsau. The station is located on the St. Gallen–Winterthur line and is served by trains on the Zurich S-Bahn lines S12 and S35. It is located within fare zone 164 of the Zürcher Verkehrsverbund (ZVV).

== Services ==
The following services stop at Räterschen:

- Zurich S-Bahn: S12/S35: half-hourly service between Winterthur and Wil; the S12 continues from Winterthur to Brugg AG.

During weekends, the station is served by a nighttime S-Bahn service (SN21), offered by Ostwind fare network, and operated by Thurbo for St. Gallen S-Bahn.

- St. Gallen S-Bahn SN21: hourly service to Winterthur and to St. Gallen (via Wil SG).

== See also ==
- Rail transport in Switzerland
