= Rickenbach, Zurich =

Rickenbach
- Municipality
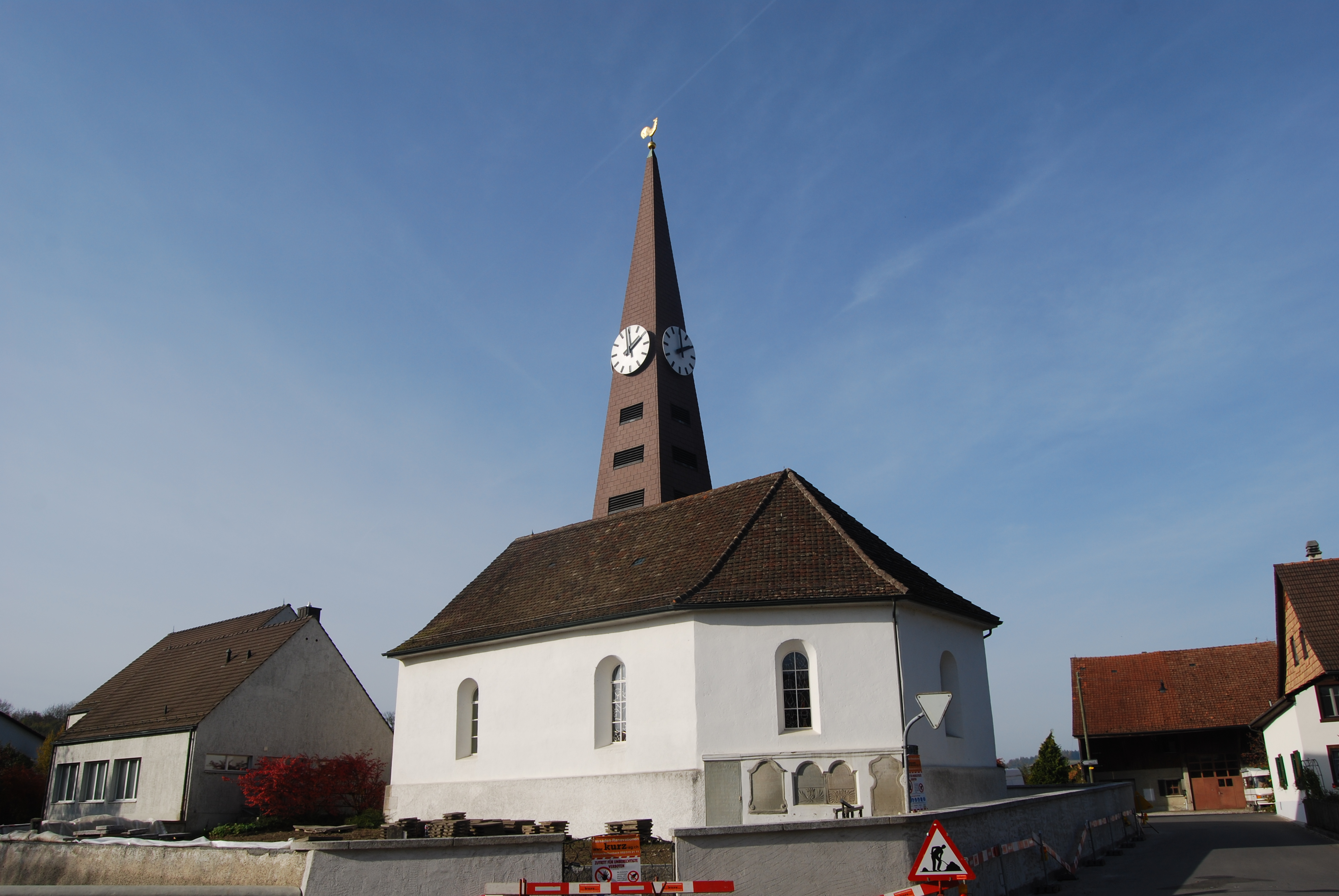

- Flag Coat of arms
- Location of Rickenbach
- Location within Switzerland Location within Canton of Zurich
- Coordinates: 47°33′N 8°48′E
- Country: Switzerland
- Canton: Zurich
- District: Winterthur

Area
  - Total: 6.03 km^{2} (2.33 sq mi)
- Elevation: 425 m (1,394 ft)

Population (December 2020)
  - Total: 2,796
  - Density: 464/km^{2} (1,200/sq mi)
- Time zone: UTC+01:00 (CET)
  - Summer (DST): UTC+02:00 (CEST)
- Postal code: 8545
- SFOS number: 0225
- ISO 3166 code: CH-ZH
- Surrounded by: Altikon, Dinhard, Ellikon an der Thur, Wiesendangen, Winterthur
- Website: www.rickenbach.zh.ch

Rickenbach (Swiss Standard German pronunciation: [ˈrɪkn̩bax]) is a municipality in the district of Winterthur in the Canton of Zurich in Switzerland.

== Geography ==
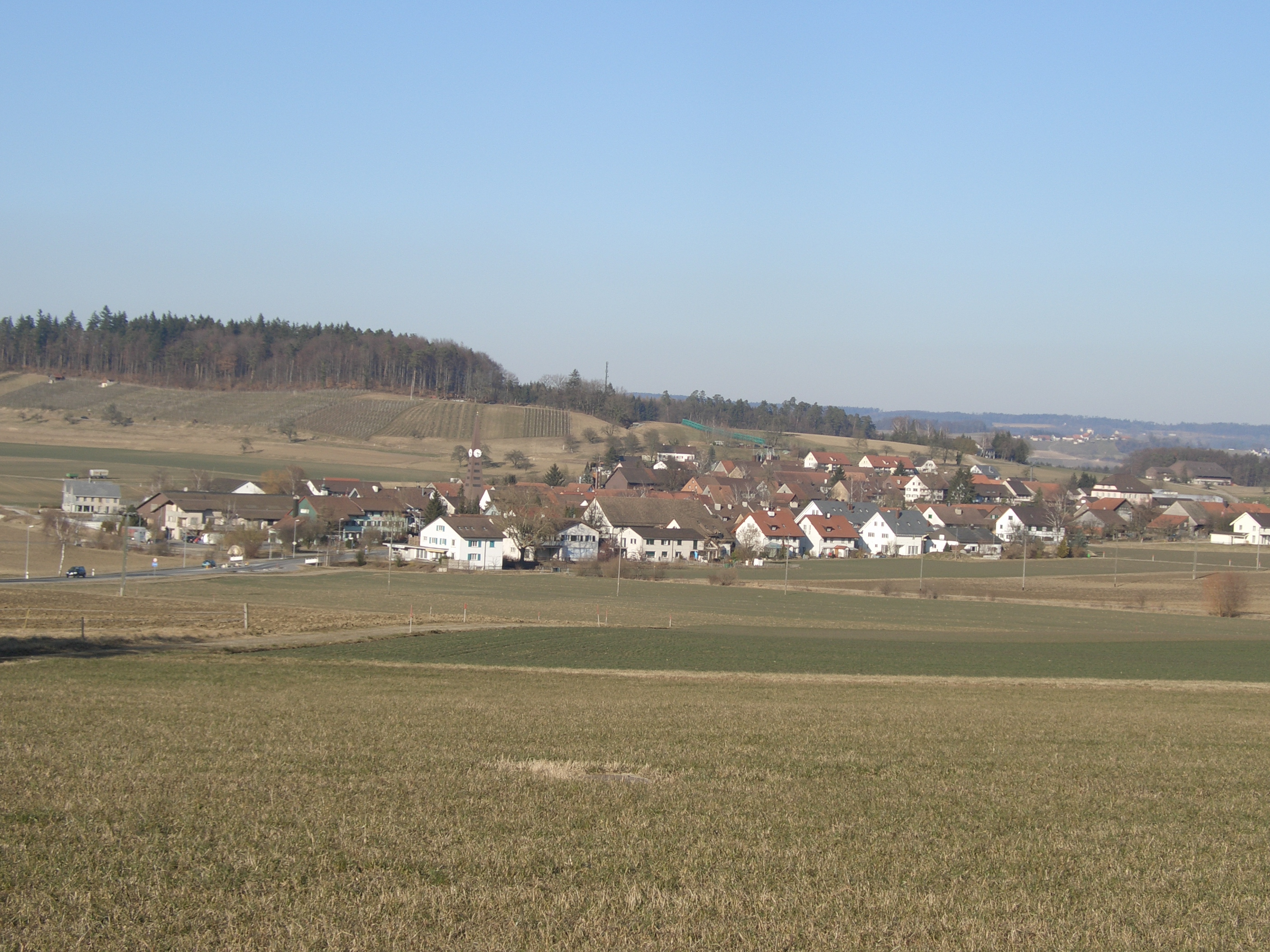
Rickenbach village

Aerial view from 400 m by Walter Mittelholzer (1923)

Rickenbach has an area of 6.1 km^{2} (2.4 sq mi). Of this area, 61.4% is used for agricultural purposes, while 22.4% is forested. Of the rest of the land, 16% is settled (buildings or roads) and the remainder (0.2%) is non-productive (rivers, glaciers or mountains). In 1996 housing and buildings made up 11.3% of the total area, while transportation infrastructure made up the rest (4.6%). Of the total unproductive area, water (streams and lakes) made up 0.2% of the area. As of 2007 12.2% of the total municipal area was undergoing some type of construction.

== Demographics ==
Rickenbach has a population (as of 31 December 2020) of 2,796. As of 2007, 9.0% of the population was made up of foreign nationals. As of 2008 the gender distribution of the population was 49.2% male and 50.8% female. Over the last 10 years the population has grown at a rate of 27.7%. Most of the population (as of 2000) speaks German (95.8%), with Italian being second most common ( 1.2%) and English being third ( 0.4%).

In the 2007 election the most popular party was the SVP which received 46% of the vote. The next three most popular parties were the SPS (13.2%), the FDP (12%) and the CSP (11.6%).

The age distribution of the population (as of 2000) is children and teenagers (0–19 years old) make up 25.4% of the population, while adults (20–64 years old) make up 59.1% and seniors (over 64 years old) make up 15.5%. In Rickenbach about 86.2% of the population (between age 25-64) have completed either non-mandatory upper secondary education or additional higher education (either university or a Fachhochschule). There are 833 households in Rickenbach.

Rickenbach has an unemployment rate of 2.14%. As of 2005, there were 99 people employed in the primary economic sector and about 30 businesses involved in this sector. 82 people are employed in the secondary sector and there are 21 businesses in this sector. 258 people are employed in the tertiary sector, with 58 businesses in this sector. As of 2007 43.4% of the working population were employed full-time, and 56.6% were employed part-time.

As of 2008 there were 615 Catholics and 1374 Protestants in Rickenbach. In the 2000 census, religion was broken down into several smaller categories. From the census, 63.5% were some type of Protestant, with 61.8% belonging to the Swiss Reformed Church and 1.7% belonging to other Protestant churches. 23.9% of the population were Catholic. Of the rest of the population, 0% were Muslim, 2.3% belonged to another religion (not listed), 2.7% did not give a religion, and 7.4% were atheist or agnostic.

== Transport ==
Rickenbach-Attikon railway station is a stop of the Zurich S-Bahn on services S24 and S30.
