= Hagenbuch =

- Municipality
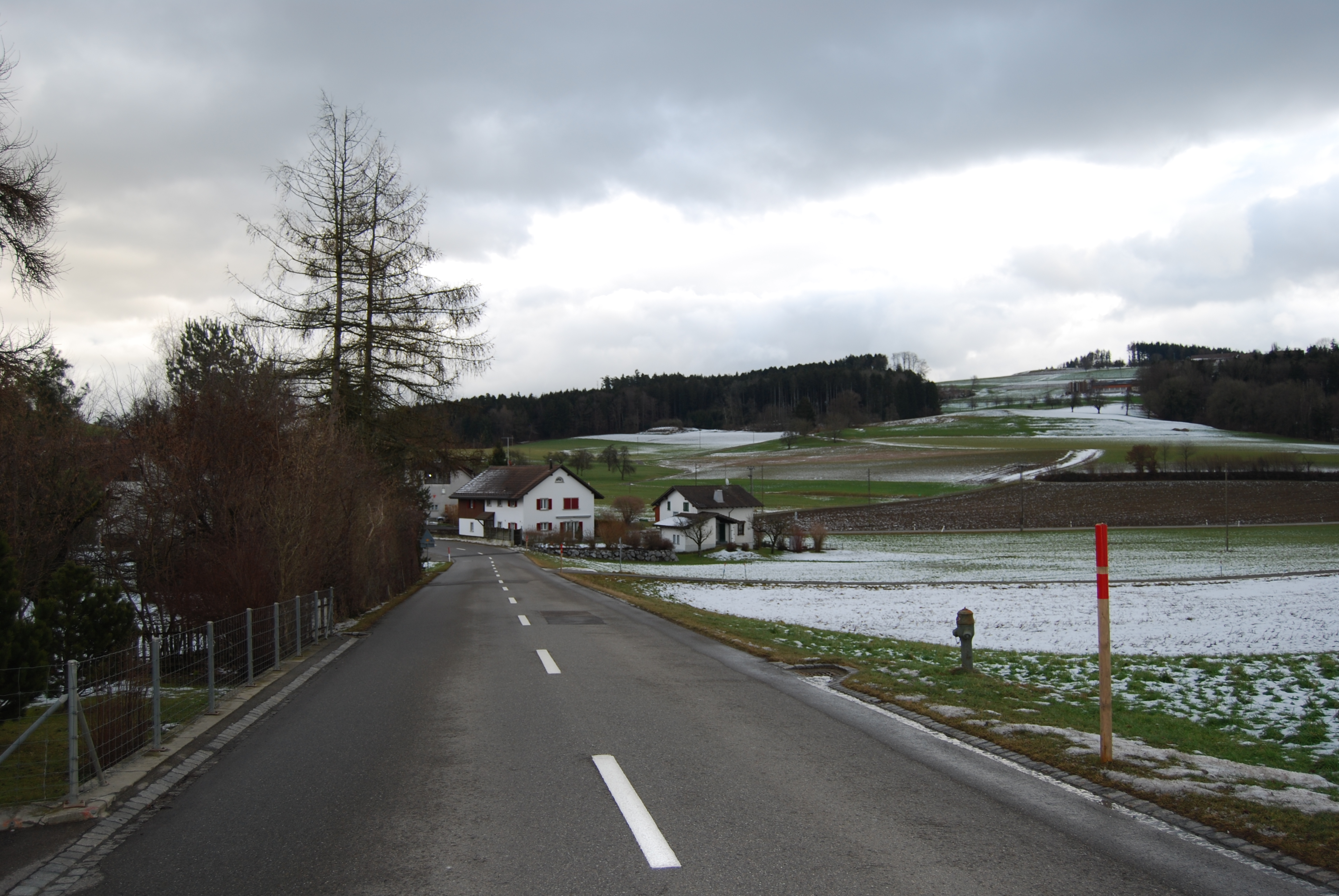

- Flag Coat of arms
- Location of Hagenbuch
- Location within Switzerland Location within Canton of Zurich
- Coordinates: 47°31′N 8°53′E
- Country: Switzerland
- Canton: Zurich
- District: Winterthur

Area
  - Total: 8.17 km^{2} (3.15 sq mi)
- Elevation: 583 m (1,913 ft)

Population (December 2020)
  - Total: 1,095
  - Density: 134/km^{2} (347/sq mi)
- Time zone: UTC+01:00 (CET)
  - Summer (DST): UTC+02:00 (CEST)
- Postal code: 8523
- SFOS number: 220
- ISO 3166 code: CH-ZH
- Surrounded by: Aadorf (TG), Bertschikon bei Attikon, Elgg, Frauenfeld (TG)
- Website: www.hagenbuch.zh.ch

Hagenbuch is a municipality in the district of Winterthur in the canton of Zürich in Switzerland.

== History ==
Hagenbuch is first mentioned in 856 as Haganbuah and at the same time the neighboring hamlet of Schneitberg was known as Sneita. Until the 19th Century it was known as Hagenbuch-Schneit.

== Geography ==
Hagenbuch has an area of 8.2 km^{2} (3.2 sq mi). Of this area, 61.6% is used for agricultural purposes, while 28.3% is forested. Of the rest of the land, 9.7% is settled (buildings or roads) and the remainder (0.4%) is non-productive (rivers, glaciers or mountains). In 1996 housing and buildings made up 5.8% of the total area, while transportation infrastructure made up the rest (3.9%). Of the total unproductive area, water (streams and lakes) made up 0.4% of the area. As of 2007 3.5% of the total municipal area was undergoing some type of construction.

The municipality is located on the border with the Canton of Thurgau. It consists of the village of Hagenbuch and the hamlets of Hagenstall, Egghof, Schneitberg, Kappel, Ober-, Mittel- and Unterschneit.

== Demographics ==
Hagenbuch has a population (as of 31 December 2020) of 1,095. As of 2007, 7.9% of the population was made up of foreign nationals. As of 2008 the gender distribution of the population was 51.2% male and 48.8% female. Over the last 10 years the population has grown at a rate of 4.3%. Most of the population (as of 2000) speaks German (94.2%), with Italian being second most common ( 1.0%) and Albanian being third ( 1.0%).

In the 2007 election the most popular party was the SVP which received 59.4% of the vote. The next three most popular parties were the SPS (11.6%), the CSP (7.6%) and the FDP (6.2%).

The age distribution of the population (as of 2000) is children and teenagers (0–19 years old) make up 28.8% of the population, while adults (20–64 years old) make up 62.1% and seniors (over 64 years old) make up 9%. The entire Swiss population is generally well educated. In Hagenbuch about 80.4% of the population (between age 25-64) have completed either non-mandatory upper secondary education or additional higher education (either university or a Fachhochschule). There are 425 households in Hagenbuch.

Hagenbuch has an unemployment rate of 1.44%. As of 2005, there were 74 people employed in the primary economic sector and about 30 businesses involved in this sector. 48 people are employed in the secondary sector and there are 8 businesses in this sector. 125 people are employed in the tertiary sector, with 28 businesses in this sector. As of 2007 43.9% of the working population were employed full-time, and 56.1% were employed part-time.

As of 2008 there were 266 Catholics and 589 Protestants in Hagenbuch. In the 2000 census, religion was broken down into several smaller categories. From the census, 60.6% were some type of Protestant, with 56.8% belonging to the Swiss Reformed Church and 3.9% belonging to other Protestant churches. 22.7% of the population were Catholic. Of the rest of the population, 0% were Muslim, 3% belonged to another religion (not listed), 2.2% did not give a religion, and 11.2% were atheist or agnostic.

The historical population is given in the following table:

year	population
1467	c. 85
1634	112
1836	597
1850	636
1900	577
1950	539
1980	568
2000	1,085
