= Guntershausen railway station =

Swiss railway station

Guntershausen
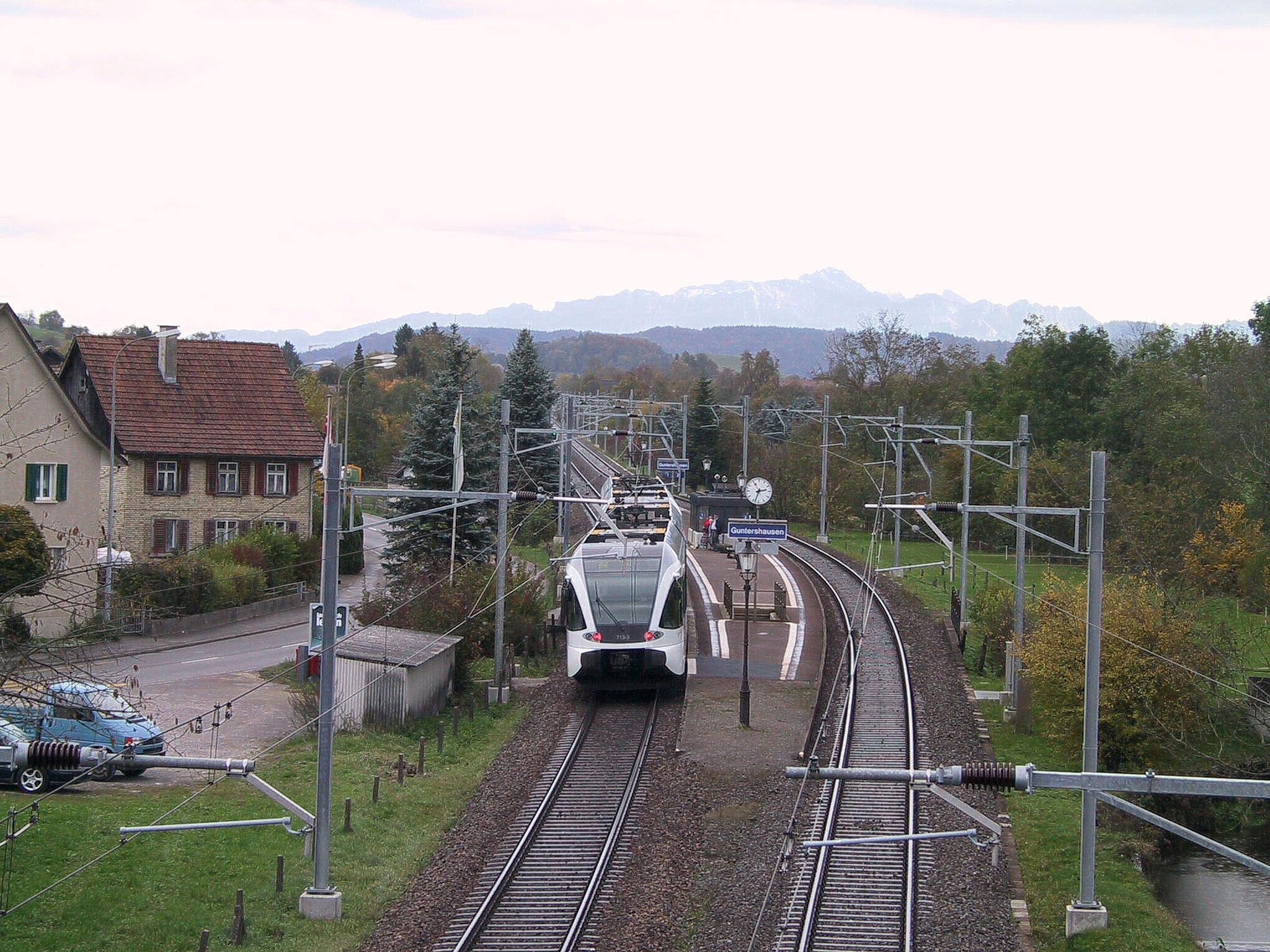
- Stadler GTW RABe 526 of Thurbo at the station in 2005

General information
- Location: Aadorf; Switzerland
- Coordinates: 47°28′27″N 8°55′01″E
- Elevation: 546 m (1,791 ft)
- Owner: Swiss Federal Railways
- Line: St. Gallen–Winterthur line
- Train operators: Swiss Federal Railways; Thurbo

Other information
- Fare zone: 917 (Tarifverbund Ostwind)

Services
Preceding station	Zurich S-Bahn	Following station
Aadorf towards Brugg AG	S12	Eschlikon towards Wil
Aadorf towards Winterthur	S35	Eschlikon towards Wil
Preceding station	St. Gallen S-Bahn	Following station
Aadorf towards Winterthur	SN21 Limited service	Eschlikon towards St. Gallen
Location
- Location within Switzerland Location within Canton of Thurgau

Guntershausen railway station (German: Bahnhof Guntershausen) is a railway station in the municipality of Aadorf, in the Swiss canton of Thurgau. It is an intermediate stop on the standard gauge St. Gallen–Winterthur line of Swiss Federal Railways. Guntershausen station is located within fare zone 917 of the Ostwind tariff network.

It opened in 1927, together with Algetshausen-Henau station situated on the same line.

== Services ==
The following services stop at Guntershausen:

- Zurich S-Bahn: S12/S35: half-hourly service between Winterthur and Wil; the S12 continues from Winterthur to Brugg AG.

During weekends, the station is served by a nighttime S-Bahn service (SN21), offered by Ostwind fare network, and operated by Thurbo for St. Gallen S-Bahn.

- St. Gallen S-Bahn SN21: hourly service to Winterthur and to St. Gallen (via Wil SG).

== See also ==
- Rail transport in Switzerland
