= Wiesendangen =

- Municipality
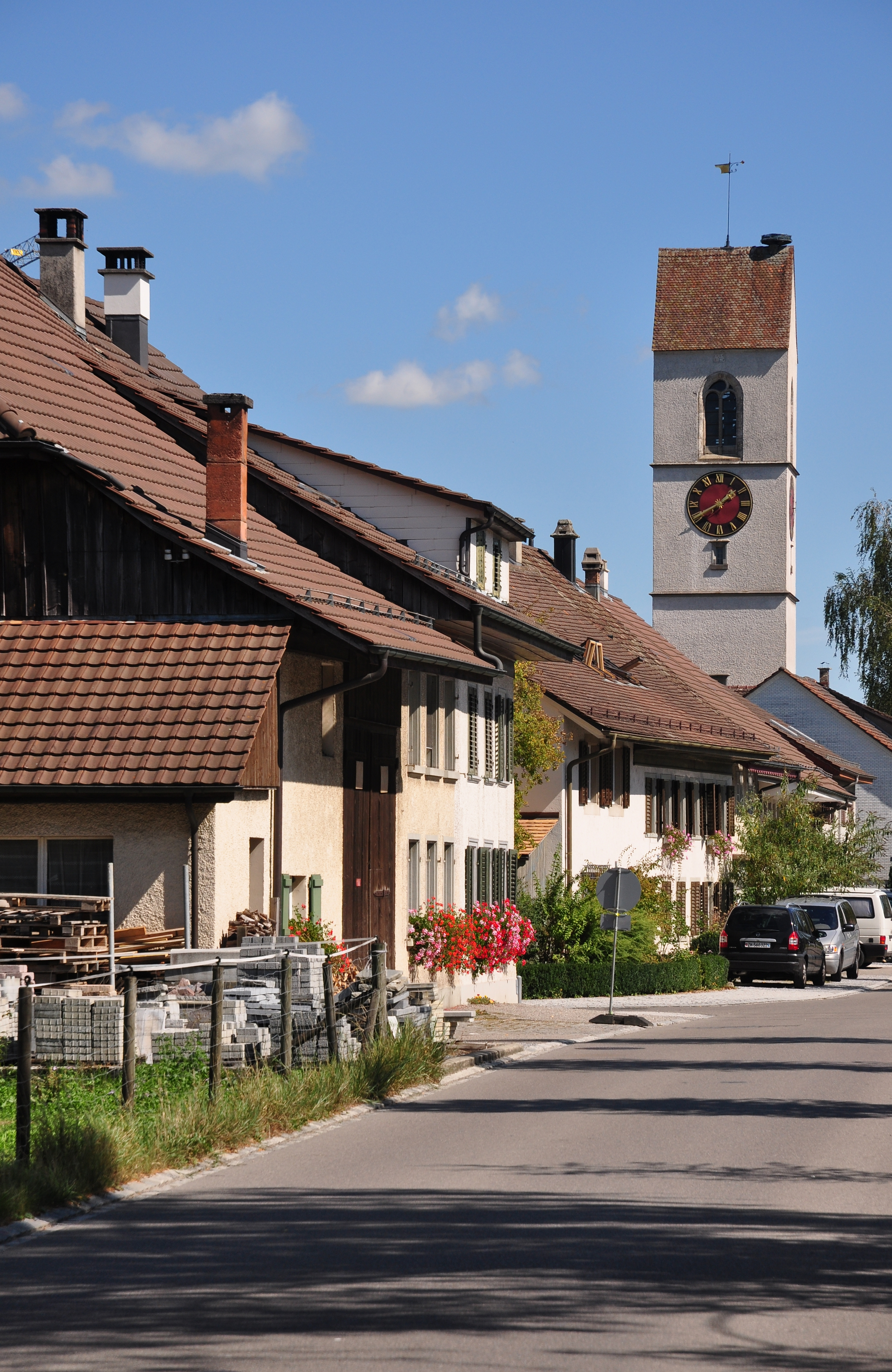

- Flag Coat of arms
- Location of Wiesendangen
- Location within Switzerland Location within Canton of Zürich
- Coordinates: 47°31′N 8°47′E
- Country: Switzerland
- Canton: Zürich
- District: Winterthur

Government
  - Mayor: Kurt Roth FDP/PRD (as of 2007)

Area
  - Total: 19.16 km^{2} (7.40 sq mi)
- Elevation: 469 m (1,539 ft)

Population (Dec 2011)
  - Total: 5,977
  - Density: 312.0/km^{2} (808.0/sq mi)
- Time zone: UTC+01:00 (CET)
  - Summer (DST): UTC+02:00 (CEST)
- Postal code: 8542
- SFOS number: 298
- ISO 3166 code: CH-ZH
- Localities: Wiesendangen, Attikon, Wallikon, Buch, Menzengrüt
- Surrounded by: Ellikon an der Thur, Elsau, Hettlingen, Rickenbach, Winterthur
- Website: www.wiesendangen.ch

Wiesendangen is a municipality in the district of Winterthur in the canton of Zürich in Switzerland. On 1 January 2014 the former municipality of Bertschikon merged into the municipality of Wiesendangen. At the same time the Community Identification Number changed from 0229 to 0298.

== History ==
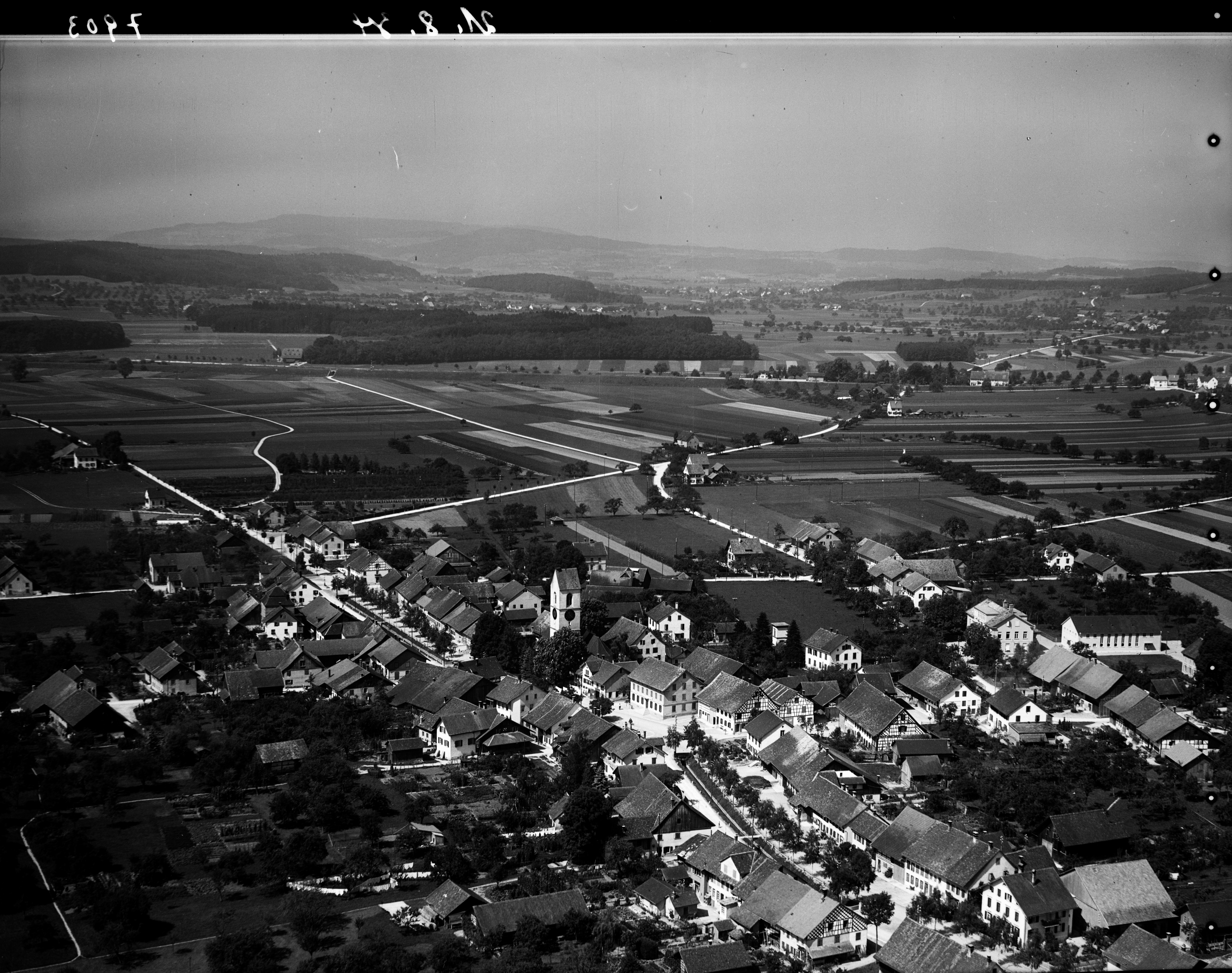
Aerial view by Walter Mittelholzer (1934)

Wiesendangen municipality (as of 2014) includes the former villages, hamlets or municipalities of: Wiesendangen, Attikon, Wallikon, Menzengrüt, Buch, Bertschikon, Gundetswil, Kefikon, Liebensberg, Stegen, Gündlikon and Zünikon. It is located on the site of Roman estates built in the 2nd and 3rd centuries along the road between Oberwinterthur and Pfyn. The area was acquired by St. Gallen Abbey in 804. Wiesendangen is first mentioned in this context, as Wisuntwangas ("wisent pasture"). Bertschikon is first mentioned in 1255 as Bersinkon. The village of Gündlikon may be mentioned in 774 as Cundilinchova though the identification is doubtful; it is mentioned in 1162 as Gundilinchova.

A tower house built in the early 12th century was inhabited by ministeriales of the House of Kyburg who called themselves von Wiesendangen or von Frauenfeld, as the acted as reeves in Frauenfeld. The manor was a fief of the bishop of Constance, given to the Hohenlandenberg family in 1472. High justice had already passed to Zürich along with the Kyburg possessions in 1452, low justice eventually passed to Zürich as well, in 1587.

The municipality of Wiesendangen was established in 1798 along older parish boundaries. The municipality of Bertschikon was also established in 1798, and merged with Gundetswil, Kefikon (Canton of Zürich portion only), Liebensberg, Stegen, Gündlikon and Zünikon in 1881. In 1928, the former municipalities of Attikon, Wallikon, Menzengrüt and Buch were incorporated into Wiesendangen. A train station was built outside of Attikon in 1855, moved to Attikon in 1907. After 1945, the municipality gradually lost its character of rural villages and developed into part of the urban agglomeration of Winterthur. The A1 motorway, built in the 1970s, passes between Attikon and Bertschikon.

== Geography ==
Before the merger Wiesendangen has an area of 9.5 km^{2} (3.7 sq mi). Of this area, 54.7% is used for agricultural purposes, while 25.4% is forested. Of the rest of the land, 19.8% is settled (buildings or roads) and the remainder (0.1%) is non-productive (rivers, glaciers or mountains). In 1996 housing and buildings made up 11% of the total area, while transportation infrastructure made up the rest (8.7%). Of the total unproductive area, water (streams and lakes) made up 0.1% of the area. As of 2007, 13.1% of the total municipal area was undergoing some type of construction. After the merger the total area was 19.17 km^{2} (7.40 sq mi).

== Demographics ==
Before the merger, the 2012 population was 4,927. After the merger the new population was (as of 31 December 2020) of 6,633. As of 2007, 6.9% of the population was made up of foreign nationals. As of 2008 the gender distribution of the population was 49.1% male and 50.9% female. Over the last 10 years the population has grown at a rate of 19%. Most of the population (as of 2000) speaks German (95.3%), with French being second most common ( 1.1%) and Italian being third ( 1.0%).

In the 2007 election the most popular party was the SVP which received 37.4% of the vote. The next three most popular parties were the FDP (15.1%), the SPS (13.6%) and the CSP (12.7%).

The age distribution of the population (as of 2000) is children and teenagers (0–19 years old) make up 24.8% of the population, while adults (20–64 years old) make up 59.9% and seniors (over 64 years old) make up 15.3%. In Wiesendangen about 86.6% of the population (between age 25–64) have completed either non-mandatory upper secondary education or additional higher education (either university or a Fachhochschule). There are 1634 households in Wiesendangen.

Wiesendangen has an unemployment rate of 1.25%. As of 2005, there were 114 people employed in the primary economic sector and about 40 businesses involved in this sector. 159 people are employed in the secondary sector and there are 25 businesses in this sector. 419 people are employed in the tertiary sector, with 96 businesses in this sector. As of 2007 32.2% of the working population were employed full-time, and 67.8% were employed part-time.

As of 2008 there were 1,117 Catholics and 2,563 Protestants in Wiesendangen. In the 2000 census, religion was broken down into several smaller categories. From the census, 65.3% were some type of Protestant, with 62% belonging to the Swiss Reformed Church and 3.3% belonging to other Protestant churches. 23.4% of the population were Catholic. Of the rest of the population, 1.9% belonged to another religion (not listed), 1.2% did not give a religion, and 8% were atheist or agnostic.

The historical population is given in the following chart:

== Transport ==
Wiesendangen railway station is a stop of the Zurich S-Bahn on the lines S24 and S30.
