= Elgg railway station =

Swiss railway station

Elgg
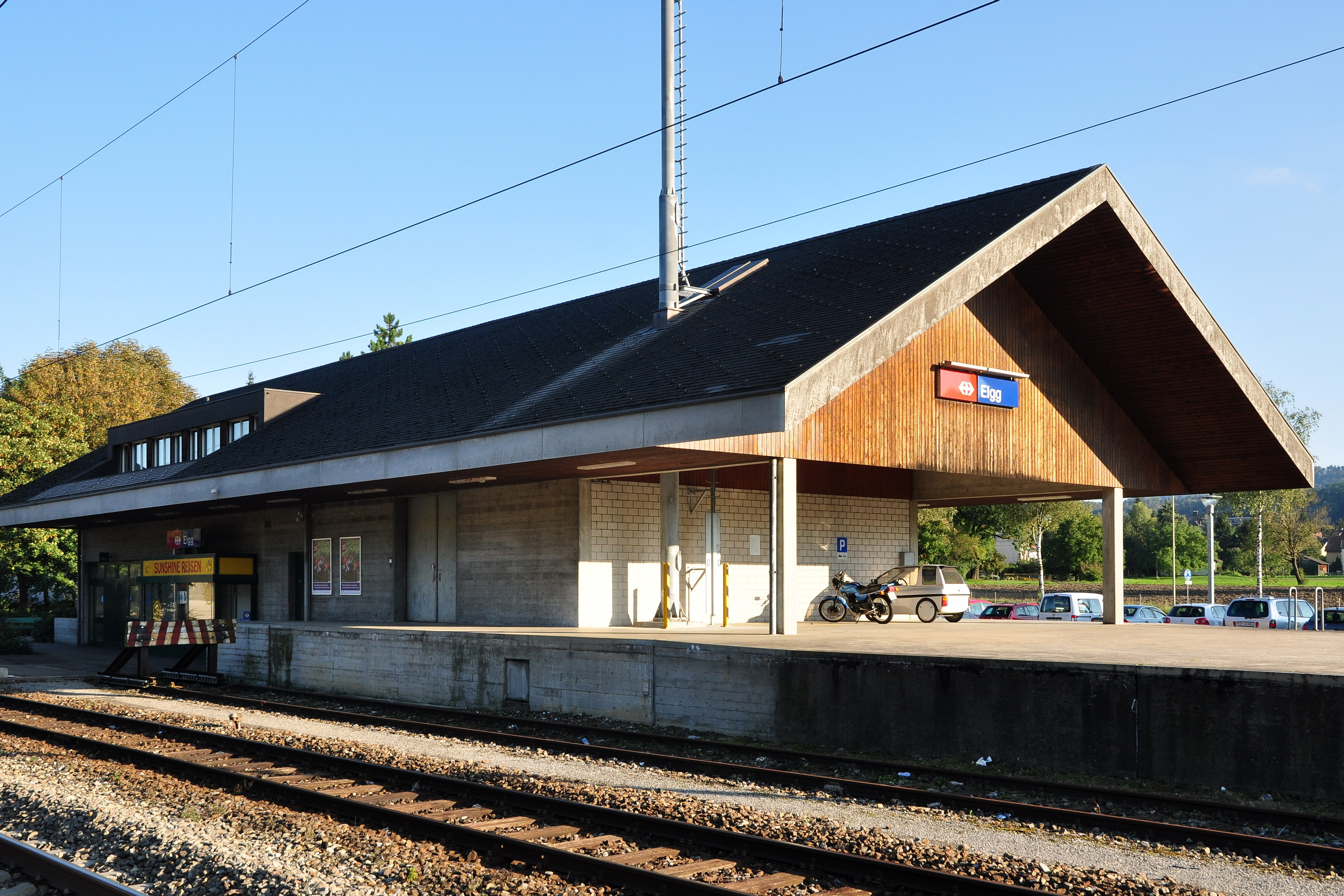
- The station building in 2011

General information
- Location: Elgg; Switzerland
- Coordinates: 47°29′55″N 8°51′48″E
- Elevation: 507 m (1,663 ft)
- Owner: Swiss Federal Railways
- Line: St. Gallen–Winterthur line
- Train operators: Swiss Federal Railways; Thurbo

Other information
- Fare zone: 164 (ZVV)

Services
Preceding station	Zurich S-Bahn	Following station
Schottikon towards Brugg AG	S12	Aadorf towards Wil
Schottikon towards Winterthur	S35	Aadorf towards Wil
Preceding station	St. Gallen S-Bahn	Following station
Schottikon towards Winterthur	SN21 Limited service	Aadorf towards St. Gallen
Location
- Location within Switzerland Location within Canton of Zurich

Elgg railway station is a railway station in the Swiss canton of Zurich and municipality of Elgg. The station is located on the St. Gallen–Winterthur line and is served by trains on the Zurich S-Bahn lines S12 and S35. It is located within fare zone 164 of the Zürcher Verkehrsverbund (ZVV).

== Services ==
The following services stop at Elgg:

- Zurich S-Bahn: S12/S35: half-hourly service between Winterthur and Wil; the S12 continues from Winterthur to Brugg AG.

During weekends, the station is served by a nighttime S-Bahn service (SN21), offered by Ostwind fare network, and operated by Thurbo for St. Gallen S-Bahn.

- St. Gallen S-Bahn SN21: hourly service to Winterthur and to St. Gallen (via Wil SG).

== See also ==
- Rail transport in Switzerland
