= Ellikon an der Thur =

- Municipality
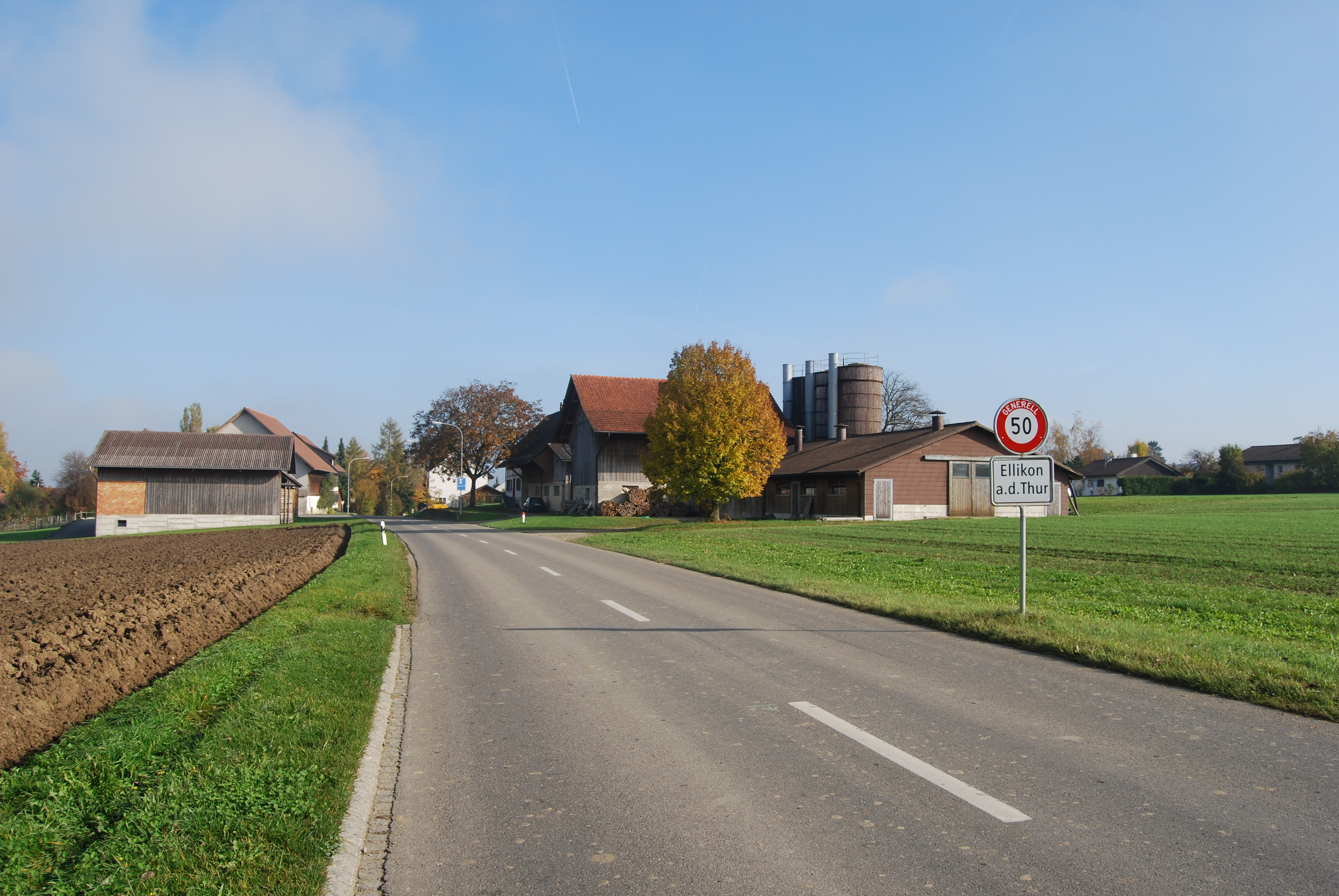

- Flag Coat of arms
- Location of Ellikon an der Thur
- Location within Switzerland Location within Canton of Zurich
- Coordinates: 47°34′N 8°50′E
- Country: Switzerland
- Canton: Zurich
- District: Winterthur

Area
  - Total: 4.92 km^{2} (1.90 sq mi)
- Elevation: 390 m (1,280 ft)

Population (December 2020)
  - Total: 936
  - Density: 190/km^{2} (493/sq mi)
- Time zone: UTC+01:00 (CET)
  - Summer (DST): UTC+02:00 (CEST)
- Postal code: 8548
- SFOS number: 218
- ISO 3166 code: CH-ZH
- Surrounded by: Altikon, Bertschikon bei Attikon, Frauenfeld (TG), Gachnang (TG), Rickenbach, Uesslingen-Buch (TG), Wiesendangen
- Website: www.ellikonanderthur.ch

Ellikon an der Thur is a municipality in the district of Winterthur in the canton of Zürich in Switzerland.

== History ==
Aerial view from 400 m by Walter Mittelholzer (1923)

Ellikon an der Thur is first mentioned in 1257 as Ellinkon.

== Geography ==
Ellikon an der Thur has an area of 5 km^{2} (1.9 sq mi). Of this area, 69.7% is used for agricultural purposes, while 19.4% is forested. Of the rest of the land, 10.4% is settled (buildings or roads) and the remainder (0.6%) is non-productive (rivers, glaciers or mountains). In 1996 housing and buildings made up 5.9% of the total area, while transportation infrastructure made up the rest (4.3%). Of the total unproductive area, water (streams and lakes) made up 0.4% of the area. As of 2007 6.7% of the total municipal area was undergoing some type of construction.

== Demographics ==
Ellikon an der Thur has a population (as of 31 December 2020) of 936. As of 2007, 8.4% of the population was made up of foreign nationals. As of 2008 the gender distribution of the population was 50.6% male and 49.4% female. Over the last 10 years the population has grown at a rate of 13.9%. Most of the population (as of 2000) speaks German (93.3%), with Serbo-Croatian being second most common ( 3.2%) and Albanian being third ( 0.7%).

In the 2007 election the most popular party was the SVP which received 53.1% of the vote. The next three most popular parties were the SPS (10.8%), the CSP (10.4%) and the FDP (8.4%).

The age distribution of the population (as of 2000) is children and teenagers (0–19 years old) make up 29.9% of the population, while adults (20–64 years old) make up 58.6% and seniors (over 64 years old) make up 11.5%. The entire Swiss population is generally well educated. In Ellikon an der Thur about 83.2% of the population (between age 25-64) have completed either non-mandatory upper secondary education or additional higher education (either university or a Fachhochschule). There are 286 households in Ellikon an der Thur.

Ellikon an der Thur has an unemployment rate of 0.87%. As of 2005, there were 185 people employed in the primary economic sector and about 21 businesses involved in this sector. 113 people are employed in the secondary sector and there are 11 businesses in this sector. 132 people are employed in the tertiary sector, with 19 businesses in this sector. As of 2007 39.3% of the working population were employed full-time, and 60.7% were employed part-time.

As of 2008 there were 129 Catholics and 533 Protestants in Ellikon an der Thur. In the 2000 census, religion was broken down into several smaller categories. From the census, 71.6% were some type of Protestant, with 67.4% belonging to the Swiss Reformed Church and 4.2% belonging to other Protestant churches. 13.2% of the population were Catholic. Of the rest of the population, 0% were Muslim, 5% belonged to another religion (not listed), 1.9% did not give a religion, and 8.4% were atheist or agnostic.

The historical population is given in the following table:

year	population
1634	321
1709	300
1850	441
1900	358
1950	437
2000	742
