= Schauenberg =

Castle ruin near Turbenthal, Switzerland

Coordinates: 47°27′36″N 8°51′58″E

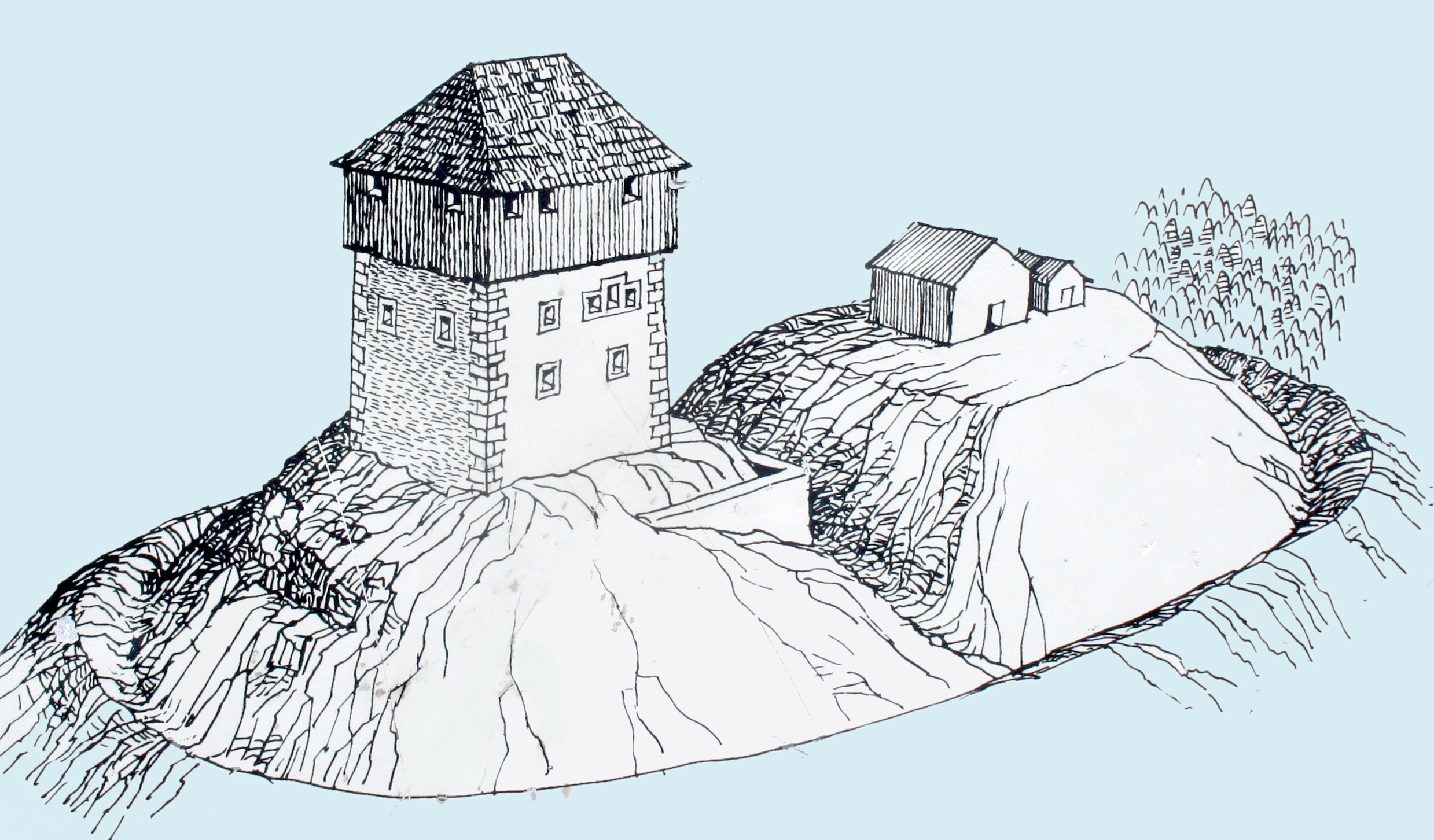
Reconstruction (scale model) of Schauenberg castle

Schauenberg is a hill and ruined castle near Turbenthal, canton of Zurich, at 892 m (2,927 ft) elevation. There were fortifications since the Iron Age, and since the early 13th century, there was a wooden structure, in the 1250s extended to a massive keep. The fortress was destroyed in 1344. From 1622, Zurich maintained a system of beacons as a warning system, and signals from Schauenberg could be seen at Schnabel (Albis), Pfannenstiel, Tämbrig (above Hermatswil), Uetliberg, Lägern, Zürichberg, Mörsburg, Kyburg, Stammheimerberg and even Hohenklingen.

The cantonal archeology department conducted excavations at the site between 1976 and 1979.

== Literature ==
- Daniel Hartmann (hrsg.): Die Burg Schauenberg bei Hofstetten. Fotorotar, Zürich 2000, ISBN 3-905647-29-X.
