= S35 (ZVV) =

Railway service in Switzerland

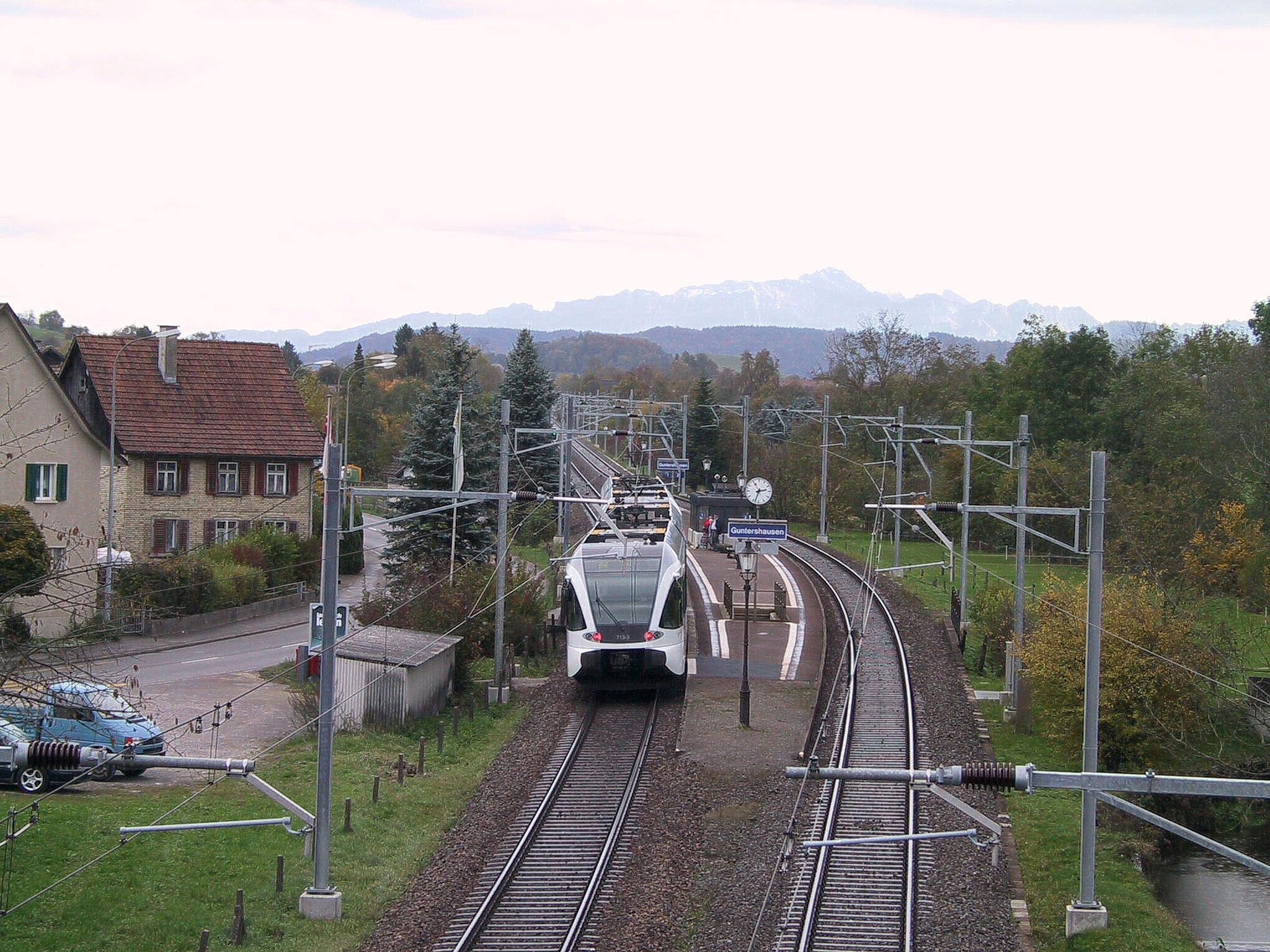
- A Thurbo Stadler GTW S35 train at Guntershausen, 2005.

Overview
- Status: Operational
- Locale: Switzerland
- Termini: Winterthur HB; Wil SG
- Stations: 11
- Website: ZVV (in English)

Service
- Type: S-Bahn
- System: Zurich S-Bahn
- Operator(s): Zürcher Verkehrsverbund (ZVV)
- Rolling stock: Thurbo Stadler GTW trains

Technical
- Track gauge: 1,435 mm (4 ft 8 1/2 in)

Zürich S-Bahn network as of December 2018

The S35 is a regional railway line of the Zurich S-Bahn on the ZVV (Zürich transportation network), in the cantons of Zurich, Thurgau and St. Gallen.

== Route ==
- S35 Winterthur–Wil SG

The line runs from Winterthur, in the canton of Zurich, to Wil, in the canton of St. Gallen, via the canton of Thurgau. For most of its route, it uses the Swiss Federal Railway's Wil–Winterthur line.

== Stations ==
- Winterthur Hauptbahnhof
- Winterthur Grüze
- Winterthur Hegi
- Räterschen
- Schottikon
- Elgg
- Aadorf
- Guntershausen
- Eschlikon
- Sirnach
- Wil SG

== Rolling stock ==
All services are operated by the Thurbo railway company, using their Stadler GTW trains.

== See also ==
- Rail transport in Switzerland
- Public transport in Zurich
- ZVV fare zones
