= Fenenna of Kuyavia =

Queen consort of Hungary
- Tenure: 1290–1295
- Born: c. 1276
- Died: 1295
- Spouse: Andrew III of Hungary
- Issue: Elizabeth of Töss
- House: Piast
- Father: Ziemomysł of Kuyavia
- Mother: Salomea of Pomerania

Fenenna of Kuyavia (also known as of Inowrocław; Polish: Fenenna kujawska or inowrocławska; c. 1276–1295) was Queen of Hungary by marriage to King Andrew III.

Fenenna was the daughter of Duke Ziemomysł of Inowrocław by his wife Salomea, daughter of Duke Sambor II of Pomerania.

Fenenna's existence is only corroborated by the Genealogia sanctae Hedwigis (Genealogy of Saint Hedwig) and the Chronicles of Jan Długosz, as well in some Hungarian sources. The Genealogy states that an unnamed daughter of Duke Ziemomysł was betrothed to the King of Hungary. Based on this information, Jan Długosz stated that Fenenna married King Stephen V. This erroneous information was maintained by the later historiography until the 19th century, when Fenenna was correctly described as the wife of King Andrew III.

Although Fenenna did not play a significant role in the Hungarian court, her marriage did strengthen the alliance between her husband and her uncle Władysław I the Elbow-high, and it also benefited her Kuyavia relatives' relations with, among others, King Wenceslaus II of Bohemia. Shortly after Andrew III's death, their daughter Elizabeth was betrothed to the future Wenceslaus III, who claimed the Hungarian crown.

== Life ==
=== Birth and Name ===
Fenenna's parentage is confirmed in the Genealogia sanctae Hedwigis (literally: Genealogy of Saint Hedwig). The marriage of her parents is placed around the first half of February 1268. If she was the oldest child of the ducal couple, she could have been born at the end of that year. She was married in 1290, and in accordance with the Canonical Law of that time, the legal age to celebrate a marriage was 12 years old; but two years later, in 1292, she gave birth to her only child, probably at 15 years. Accordingly, her date of birth could be between 1268 and 1277. Among the offspring of Duke Ziemomysł, Fenenna has been placed as the second child, between Euphemia (who died in infancy) and Leszek.

Fenenna's name was chosen from the Bible (later translated by Jakub Wujek), as one of the two wives of Elkanah, father of the Prophet Samuel. This uncommon name was rarely used in Poland, and Fenenna was the only member of the Piast dynasty who bore it.

=== Queen of Hungary ===
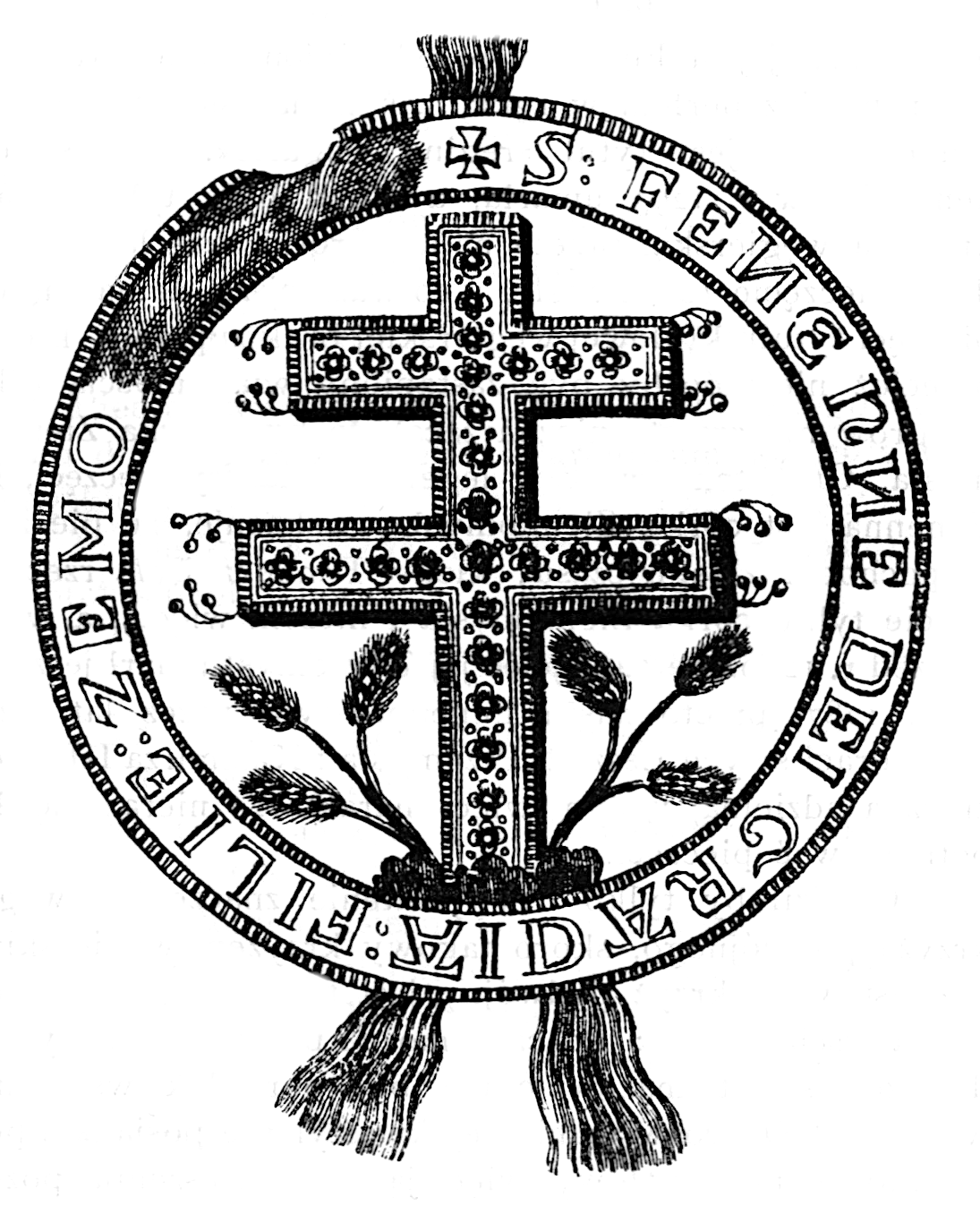
Fenenna's seal as Queen of Hungary, dated 1291.

The Genealogy of Saint Hedwig indicated that Fenenna was betrothed to the Hungarian king. According to Jan Długosz this Hungarian ruler was King Stephen V. Although this assumption was not supported by any sources could not be true because Stephen V died in 1272, it was maintained until the 18th century. Her husband was King Andrew III, as confirmed by the Hungarian sources. From the period of her reign, between 1290–1295, there are several documents issued by the Queen of Hungary, who signed as Fenena, Fennena, or in short Fenenna F. Legends on Hungarian stamps of 1291 certify that Queen Fenenna was Ziemomysł's daughter. Due to her marriage, the Polish Kingdom began to cooperate closely with the Hungarian ruler.

In July 1290 Andrew III was crowned King of Hungary. One of his first actions was the conclusion of an alliance with Poland, in particular with Duke Władysław I the Elbow-high. In September negotiations began and no later than 9 October Fenenna arrived in Hungary as Andrew's bride, escorted by the king's envoy Theodore Tengerdi. From 1290 three documents were issued describing Fenenna as Andrew III's wife and Queen of Hungary. The marriage of Andrew III and Fenenna took place between September and 24 November 1290. Probably during the wedding ceremony, or shortly after, Fenenna was crowned as Queen of Hungary.

The marriage was pursued by Fenenna's uncle, Władysław I the Elbow-high, who wanted allies for his fight for the Polish throne. The Hungarian-Kuyavian alliance proved beneficial to both parties. The Dukes of Kuyavia helped Andrew III to defeat Charles Martel of Anjou, who claimed the Hungarian throne after the death of his maternal uncle, King Ladislaus IV the Cuman, in 1290. In return, the Hungarians sent provisions and military support to Władysław I during his fight against King Wenceslaus II of Bohemia and Duke Henry III of Głogów. Documents issued by Andrew III from 1293 show that aid was sent to the Dukes of Kuyavia. These documents specify that Andrew recompensed two Hungarian men, Paul and Serafila, for help in winning Prędocin. In 1297 documents record that Władysław, with the help of the Hungarians, invaded Greater Poland and Silesia.

From the surviving contemporary documents, it is known that Fenenna did not play a great role in the Hungarian court. In 1292, Fenenna gave birth her only child, a daughter named Elizabeth.

=== Death and aftermath ===
The sources are silent about Fenenna's death. Therefore, the date of her death can be determined only on basis of the negotiations of King Andrew III with the Austrian court for his second marriage with Agnes of Habsburg, and the documents issued by both Fenenna and Agnes. Almost all the known sources place the wedding of King Andrew III with Agnes of Habsburg in Vienna on 13 February 1296. However, although the year is generally accepted, the exact day and months varied in a number of partly independent sources. Documents issued by the Queen of Hungary also contributed to the confusion. The last document issued by Fenenna was dated 8 September 1295, while the first document issued by Agnes was dated 1 May 1295. Since the marriage of Andrew III with the Austrian princess was in 1296, the document probably was incorrectly written and had to be moved back by one year. It is now accepted that Andrew III's wedding with Agnes of Habsburg was held in 1296. In consequence, Fenenna was certainly dead by the end of 1295; the place of her burial is unknown.

After Fenenna's death, Andrew III entered into an agreement with Władysław I's opponent, Wenceslaus II. As a part of this settlement, his daughter Elizabeth was engaged to the son and heir of the Bohemian king, the future Wenceslaus III, in 1298. However, this marriage was never realized. Wenceslaus instead married Viola Elisabeth of Cieszyn, but later he planned to divorce Viola and marry Elizabeth before he was assassinated.

When King Andrew III died in 1301, Elizabeth was taken by her stepmother Agnes to Austria and forced to join the Dominican monastery in Töss, Switzerland, where she died in 1338 as the last representative of the Arpad dynasty.

== Ancestry ==
Ancestors of Fenenna of Kuyavia

8. Konrad I of Masovia
4. Casimir I of Kuyavia
9. Agafia of Rus
2. Ziemomysl of Kuyavia
10. Henry II the Pious
5. Constance of Wrocław
11. Anna of Bohemia
1. Fenenna of Kuyavia
12. Mestwin I, Duke of Pomerania
6. Sambor II, Duke of Pomerania
13. Swinisław of Poland
3. Salome of Pomerania
14. Henry II of Mecklenburg
7. Matilda of Mecklenburg
15. Kristina of Skåne

Fenenna of Kuyavia House of Piast Born: c. 1276 Died: 1295
Royal titles
Preceded by Elisabeth of Sicily	Queen consort of Hungary; 1290–1295	Succeeded by Agnes of Austria
