= Johann Werdmüller =

Johann Werdmüller may refer to:

- Johann Conrad Werdmüller (1819–1892), Swiss illustrator and engraver
- Johann Rudolf Werdmüller (1639–1668), Swiss Baroque painter and medallist
