= Töss =

Coordinates: 47°30′N 8°42′E

Töss District of the city of Winterthur
- District
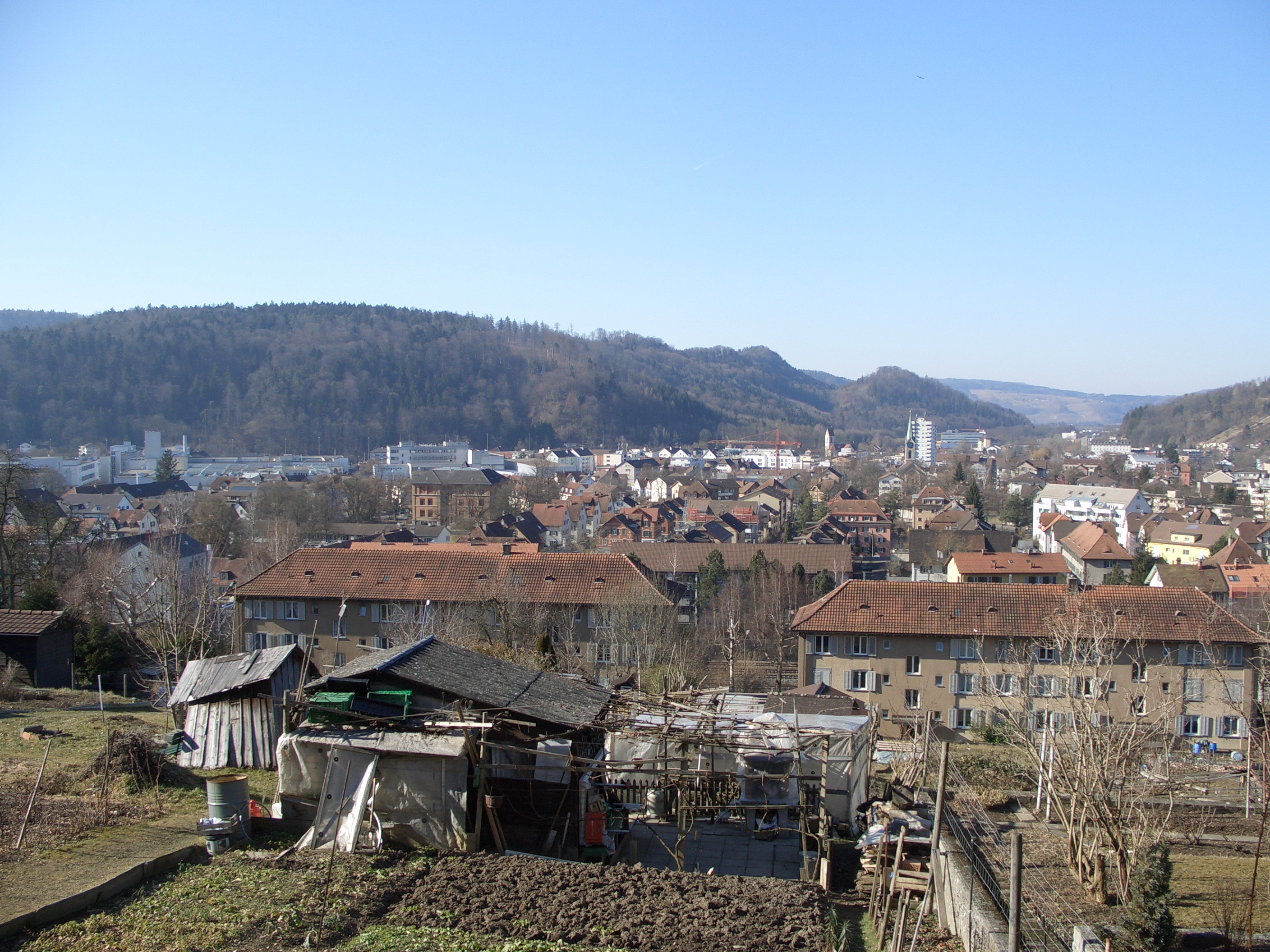

- Flag Seal

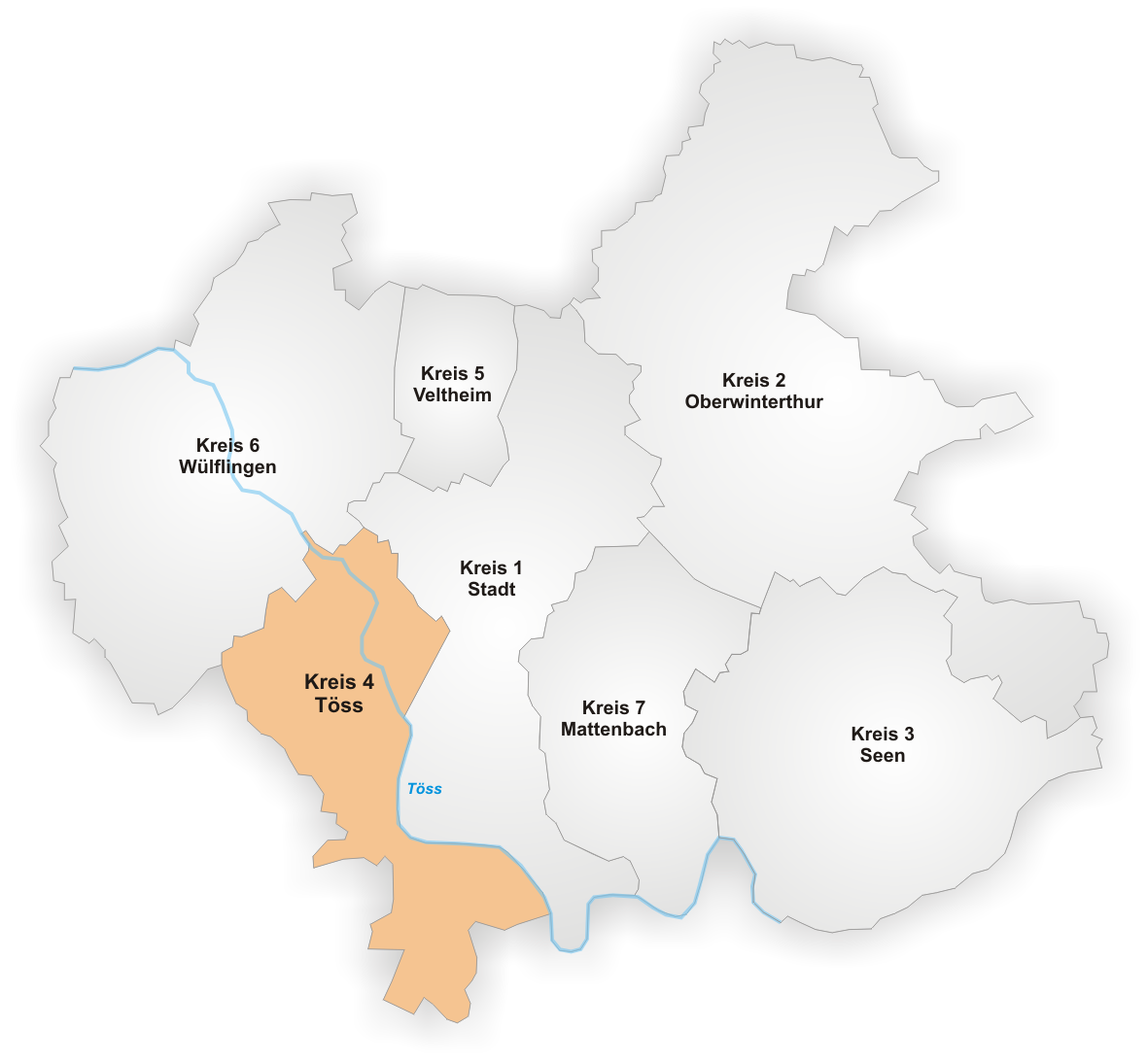
- Country: Switzerland
- Canton: Zürich
- City: Winterthur

Area
  - Total: 7.21 km^{2} (2.78 sq mi)

Population (31. Dec. 2012)
  - Total: 10,381
- District number: 4
- Quarters: Schlosstal; Dättnau; Eichliacker; Rossberg

Töss (German pronunciation: [ˈtøːs]) is a district in the Swiss city of Winterthur. It is district number 4. The district comprises the quarters Schlosstal, Dättnau, Eichliacker and Rossberg. It is named after the river Töss which flows through the district.

In the Middle Ages, the village was renowned as the location of the Töss nunnery, where Elizabeth of Hungary and Elsbeth Stagel were the nuns. The latter described the lives of its nuns in some detail.

Töss was formerly a municipality of its own, but was incorporated into Winterthur in 1922.

Aerial view by Walter Mittelholzer (1919)

== Notable residents ==
- Blessed Elizabeth of Töss (1292–1336 or 1338), a Hungarian princess and the last member of the House of Árpád and a Dominican nun
- Georges Miez (1904–1999) a Swiss gymnast. He competed at the 1924, 1928, 1932 and 1936 Summer Olympics, winning a total of four gold, three silver and one bronze medals.
