= Schlosstal =

Coordinates: 47°30′23″N 8°41′5″E

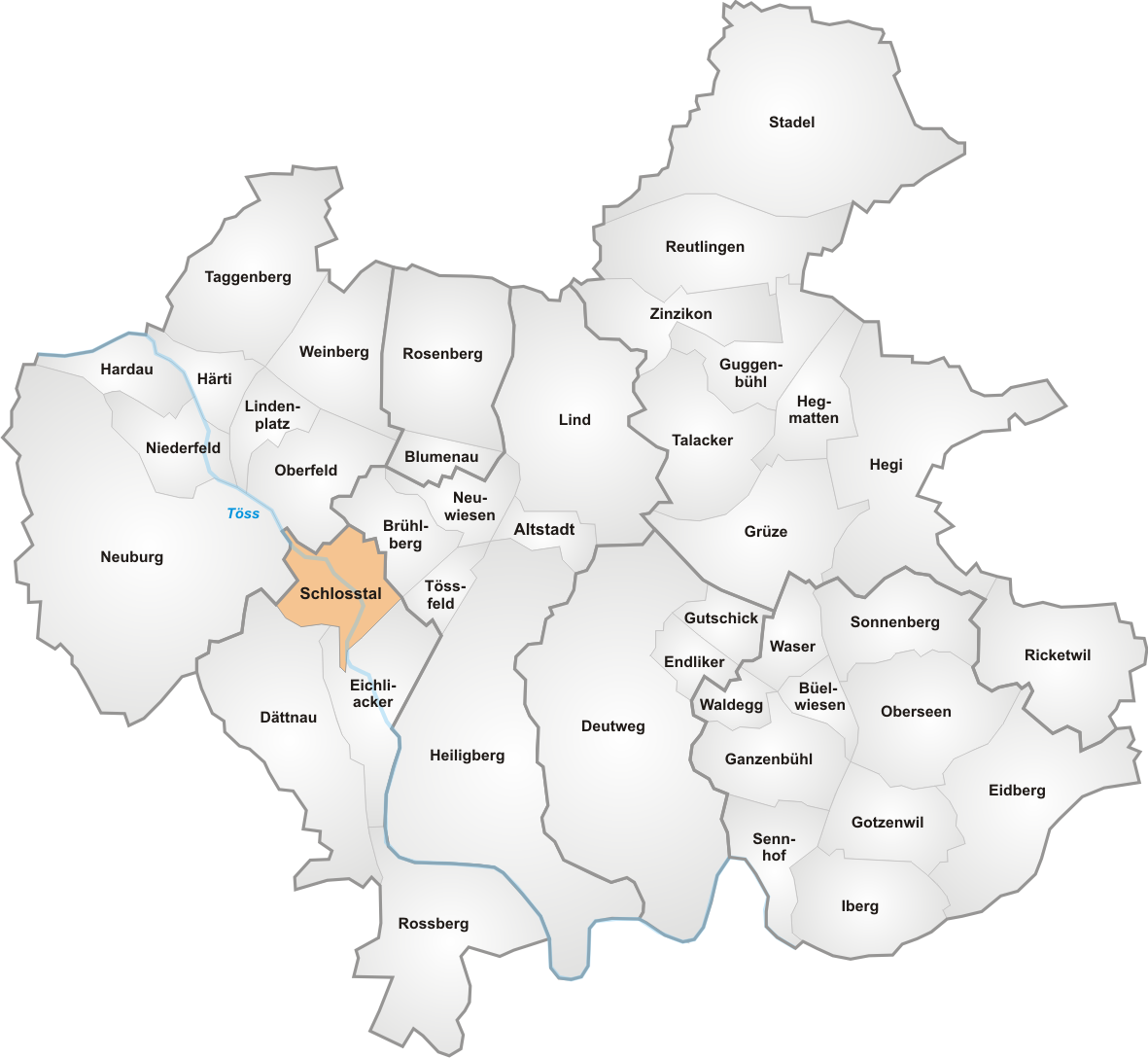
The quarter of Schlosstal in Winterthur.

Schlosstal is a quarter in the district 4 (Töss) of Winterthur, Switzerland.

It was formerly a part of Töss municipality, which was incorporated into Winterthur in 1922.
