= Elsbeth Stagel =

Swiss nun (c. 1300 – c.1360)

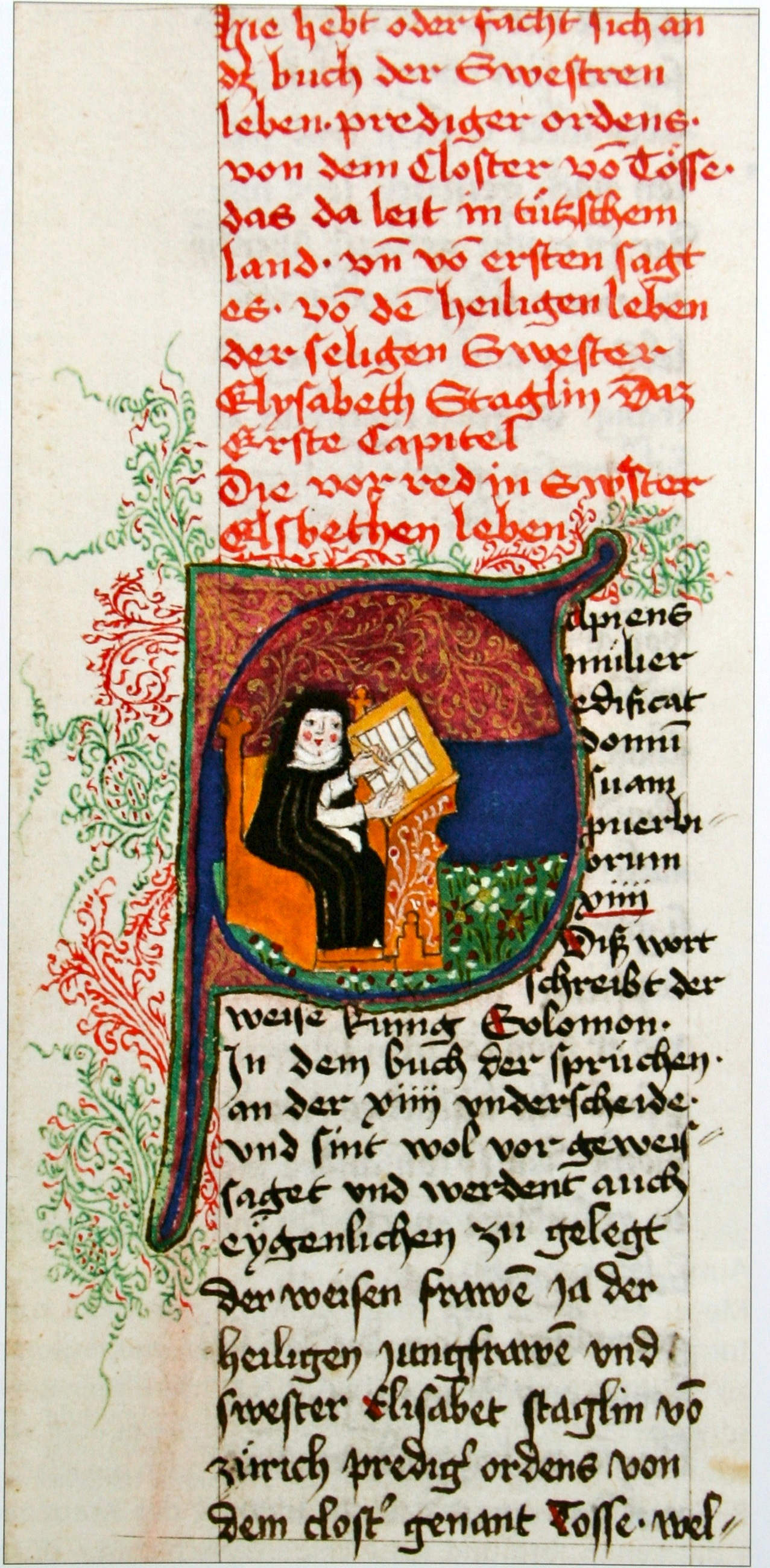
Elsbeth Stagel depicted in a copy of Lives of the Nuns of Töss.

Elisabeth or Elsbeth Stagel (c. 1300 – c. 1360) was a Dominican nun and prioress of the Töss Convent.

== Biography ==
Stagel was born into a noble family of Zurich, the daughter of a councilor.

She developed a deep friendship with Henry Suso, and the two remained in active correspondence. Suso considered Stagel his spiritual daughter. During their meetings, Stagel asked Suso to help her understand the pathway to God by sharing with her his own experiences. However, Suso did not know that the well-educated nun was keeping the letters he sent her and recording all that Suso told her, concerning both theological matters and his extreme practices of personal penance. When Suso learned of Stagel's undertaking, he requested the texts and proceeded to burn them, saving only the second installment of manuscripts for the sake of educating other religious. Suso forbade Stagel to imitate him by engaging in extreme asceticism, fearing for her health.

The historicity of Stagel as the author of the Lives of the Nuns of Töss, a work containing biographies of 39 nuns and providing a comprehensive picture of mysticism in the Töss Convent, is subject to debate. Blessed Elizabeth of Hungary may have been one of the nuns whose life Stagel described but this allegation has been particularly disputed because the book portrays Blessed Elizabeth's stepmother, Agnes of Austria, dowager queen of Hungary, very negatively; it is highly unlikely that such a biography was written before the death of Queen Agnes who outlived Stagel, dying in 1364.

Stagel died in Töss. Stagel's work is integral to understanding mysticism and monastic life in medieval Germany.

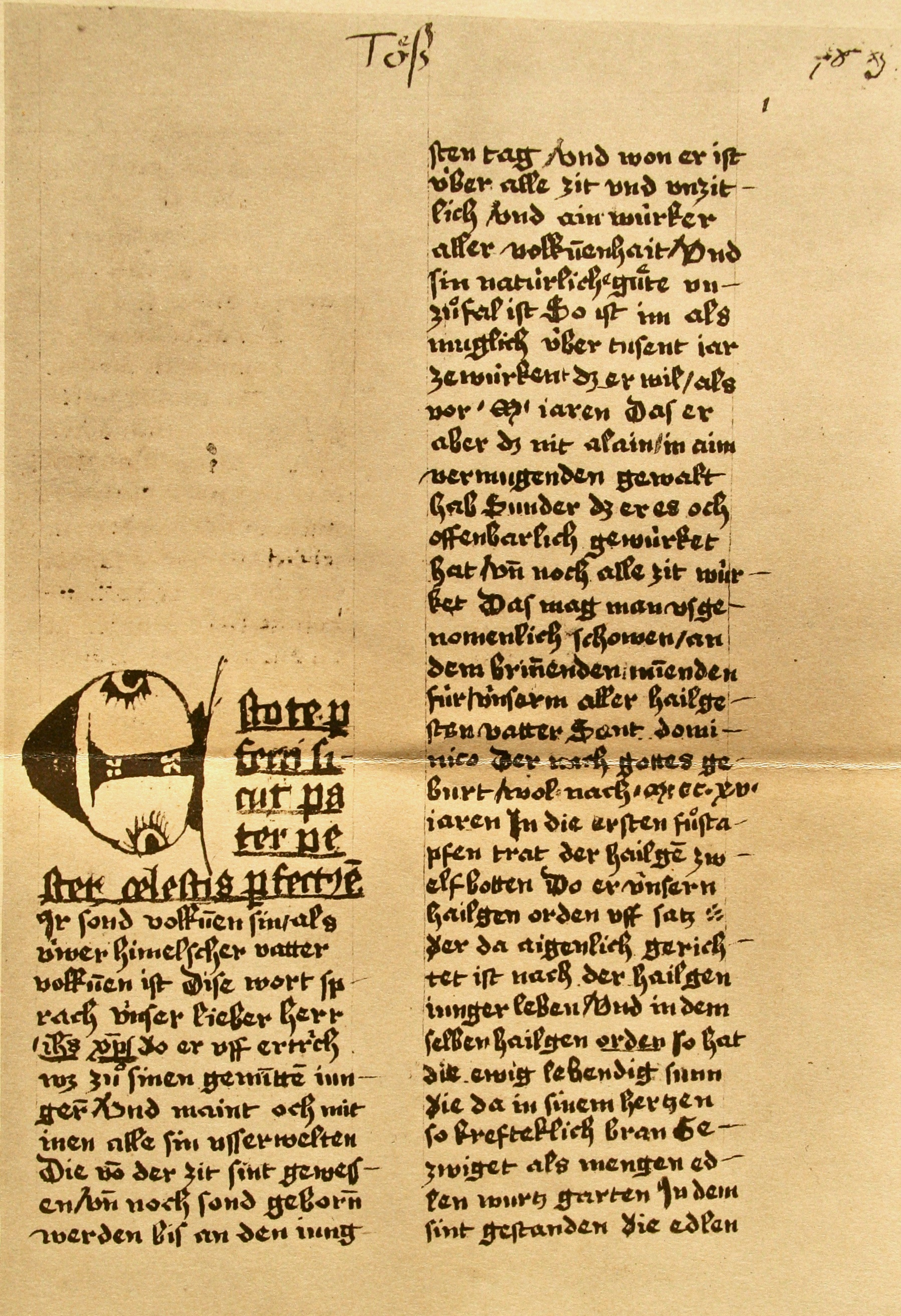
Original preface of the book

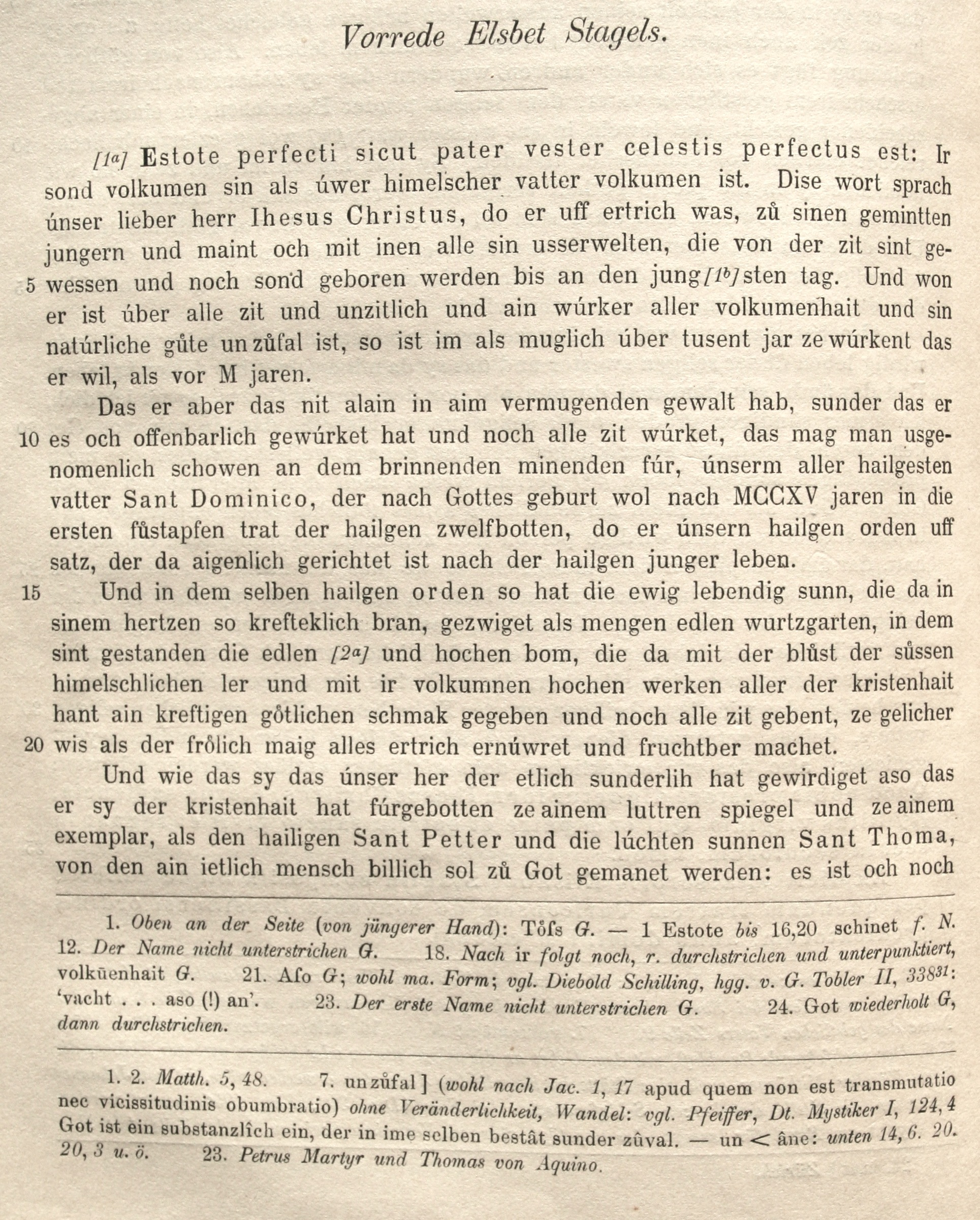
Preface

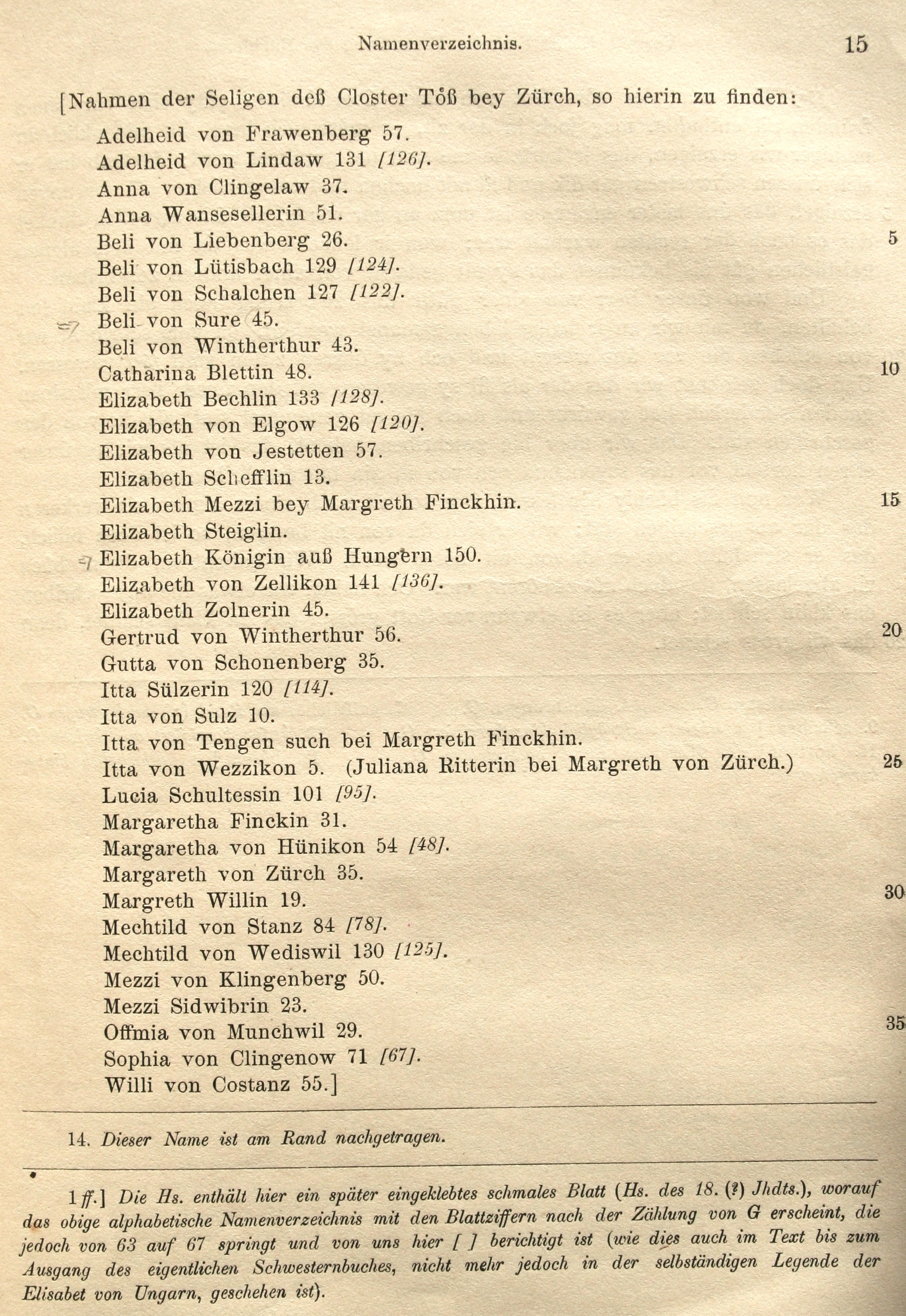
Names of nuns
