= Dättnau =

Coordinates: 47°29′4″N 8°41′37″E

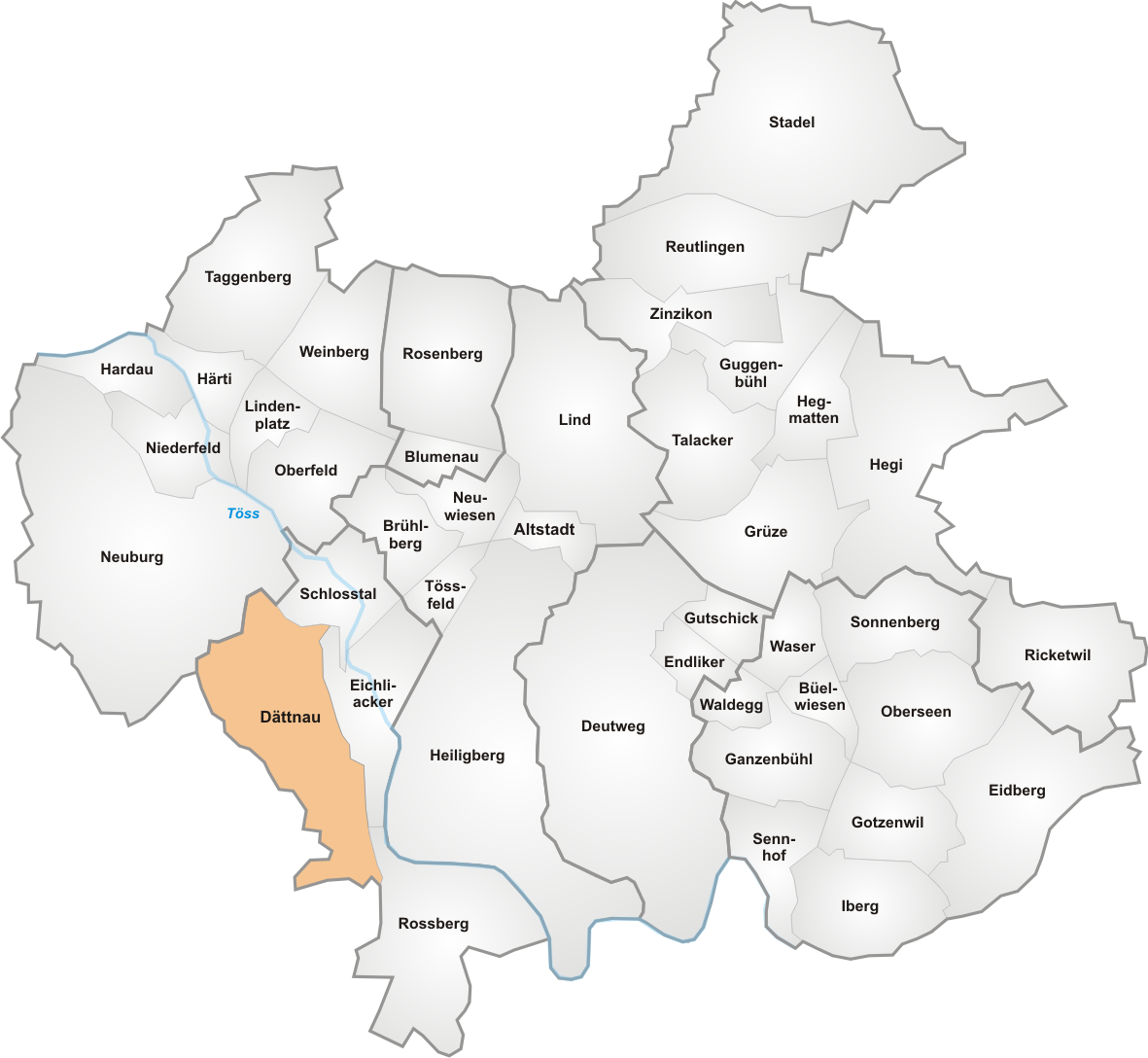
The quarter of Dättnau in Winterthur.

streetmap of Dättnau

Dättnau (German pronunciation: [ˈdɛtnau]) is a quarter in the district 4 (Töss) of Winterthur.

It was formerly a part of Töss municipality, which was incorporated into Winterthur in 1922.

The quarter has a population of approximately 3,900 (2025).
