= Elizabeth of Töss =

Hungarian princess

Elizabeth of Hungary
- Born: 1292; Buda Castle, Buda, Kingdom of Hungary
- Died: 31 October 1336 or 6 May 1338; Töss Monastery, Zürich, Holy Roman Empire
- House: House of Árpád
- Father: Andrew III of Hungary
- Mother: Fenenna of Kuyavia

Elizabeth of Hungary (1292 – 31 October 1336 or 6 May 1338; also known as Blessed Elizabeth of Töss, O.P.) was a Hungarian princess and the last member of the House of Árpád. A Dominican nun, Elizabeth spent most of her life in Töss Monastery in today's Switzerland. Despite being the sole surviving member of the first royal house of Hungary, Elizabeth never had any influence on Hungarian politics. She became honored by the local populace as a saint.

== Early life and engagements ==
Born in 1292 in Buda Castle, Elizabeth was the daughter of King Andrew III, the last Árpádian king of Hungary, and of his first wife, Fenenna of Kuyavia. Queen Fenenna died in 1295 and the king soon remarried, choosing as his second wife Agnes of Austria, a Habsburg. On 12 February 1298, Elizabeth was betrothed to Wenceslaus III of Bohemia, the son and heir apparent of King Wenceslaus II of Bohemia.

King Andrew died on 14 January 1301, leaving Elizabeth as the only and final member of the ancient royal house. After lengthy negotiations, Queen Agnes was not only allowed to leave Hungary, but also to take much treasure and the eight-year-old Elizabeth with her to Vienna. The Habsburgs were very eager for Agnes to have custody of Elizabeth because Wenceslaus of Bohemia claimed the throne of Hungary as Elizabeth's fiancé; a personal union between the Kingdoms of Hungary and Bohemia, with Habsburg territories in between, was not in their interest. Elizabeth's engagement to Wenceslaus was broken off in 1305, the same year Wenceslaus became King of Bohemia, probably under pressure from Agnes' father, King Albert I of Germany. Agnes then had Elizabeth betrothed to her favourite brother, Henry the Friendly, but the marriage never took place and the Habsburgs decided to support the claim of Charles I of Hungary.

== Relationship with her stepmother ==
The Árpádian double cross was added to the coat of arms of Töss in the 14th century, in honour of the Blessed Elizabeth.

In 1310, Agnes moved to Königsfelden Monastery, which she and her mother, Elizabeth of Carinthia, had recently founded. She sent her stepdaughter to the Dominican nuns at Töss Monastery. In Tösser Schwesternbuch (Lives of the Nuns of Töss), Agnes is presented as a wicked stepmother who forces a virtuous princess to become a nun like her. According to the book, Elizabeth was shown all the monasteries of Swabia before she chose Töss; only 15 weeks later, Agnes forces the monastery to allow Elizabeth to take her final vows. The book emphasises Elizabeth's heritage, insisting that she is the lawful heiress to the Hungarian throne, and seems to suggest that she could have become Queen of Hungary had she not been tucked away in the monastery. It goes on to report Elizabeth's illness, during which she was sent to Baden.

Elizabeth is depicted in the book as having been very poor, prompting the local nobility to give her presents. Her stepmother showed her King Andrew's treasure brought from Hungary but kept everything for herself. In Zurich, the narrator declares, both laymen and clergy honoured Elizabeth, regarding her as the noblest nun in the country. On the other hand, the mid-14th-century Königsfelden Chronicle depicts an entirely different Agnes who looked after her "daughter" and frequently visited her.

Modern historians have generally taken the relationship between Elizabeth and Agnes described in Schwesternbuch for granted. However, it may have been exaggerated, as having an evil stepmother would be seen as a spiritual trial for Elizabeth. Furthermore, some lines seem to be part of an anti-Habsburg agenda. It is certain, however, that Agnes always focused all her attention on the well-being and promotion of her own family, which may have included harsh measures against a princess who could have become politically dangerous to the House of Habsburg.

== Death and legacy ==
According to the Schwesternbuch, Elizabeth died on 6 May 1338. However, her gravestone, a part of which still exists, records that she died on 31 October 1336 but also records that she lived in Töss for 28 years. Her death meant the extinction of the House of Árpád. The Schwesternbuch records that Elizabeth died after a life of extraordinary suffering and uncommon grace, her great-aunt, Saint Elizabeth of Hungary, having appeared to her on three occasions. Also that Queen Agnes went to Töss eight days later and her stepdaughter appeared to her. From then on, it is said, the queen donated much more to the monastery.

Elizabeth's feast day is 6 May. For some time, she was venerated in Töss but the devotion has never been authorized by the Catholic Church.

The Revelations of Saint Elizabeth of Hungary, a popular text in the Middle Ages, has been attributed to Elizabeth of Töss. This allegation has been disputed by the historian Gábor Klaniczay, as the Schwesternbuch makes no reference to it. Klaniczay also finds it unlikely that a work of a Dominican nun living in Switzerland would appear in Franciscan-inspired manuscripts in central Italy during her own lifetime.

However, literary scholars Alexandra Barratt and Sarah McNamer have argued for the correct attribution of the Revelations of Saint Elizabeth of Hungary to Elizabeth of Töss. In the past the Revelations had been attributed to Elizabeth of Thuringia, who was well known as a widowed mother of three, devoted to poverty and care of the poor, and a lay member of the Third Order of St. Francis – but not, according to any early sources, inclined to mysticism. It is her lesser-known great-niece Elizabeth of Töss who seems the more likely Elizabeth of the Revelations: according to her vita written by fellow nun Elsbeth Stagel, she fostered a deep devotion to the Virgin Mary and was admired for her extreme piety and her visions.

== See also ==
- Saint Margaret of Hungary, her first cousin once removed
- Blessed Yolanda of Hungary, her first cousin once removed
- Saint Kinga of Hungary, her first cousin once removed
