= Eichliacker =

Coordinates: 47°29′16″N 8°42′41″E

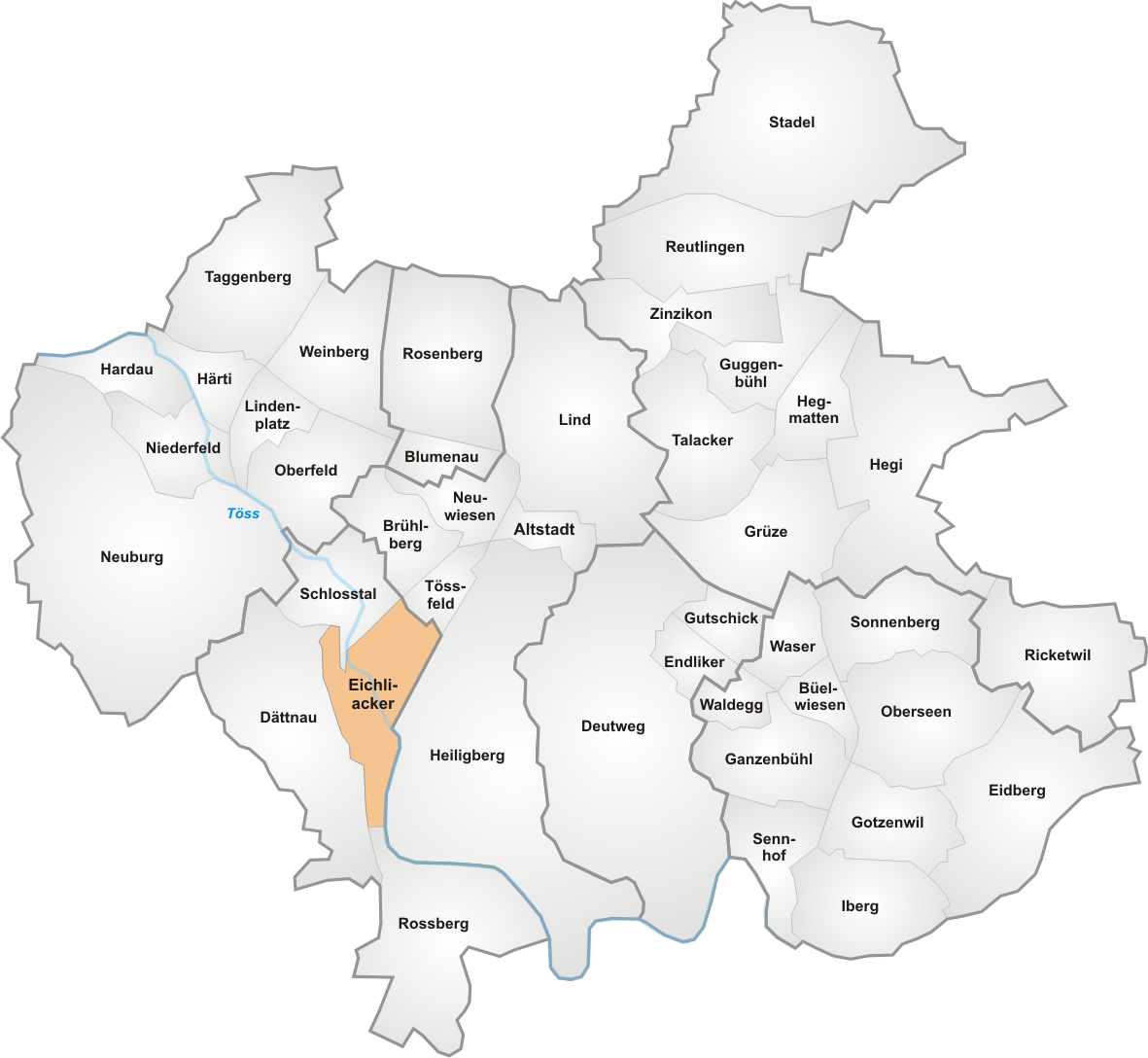
The quarter of Eichliacker in Winterthur.

Eichliacker is a quarter in the district 4 (Töss) of Winterthur.

It was formerly a part of Töss municipality, which was incorporated into Winterthur in 1922.
