= Töss Monastery =

- Kloster Töss
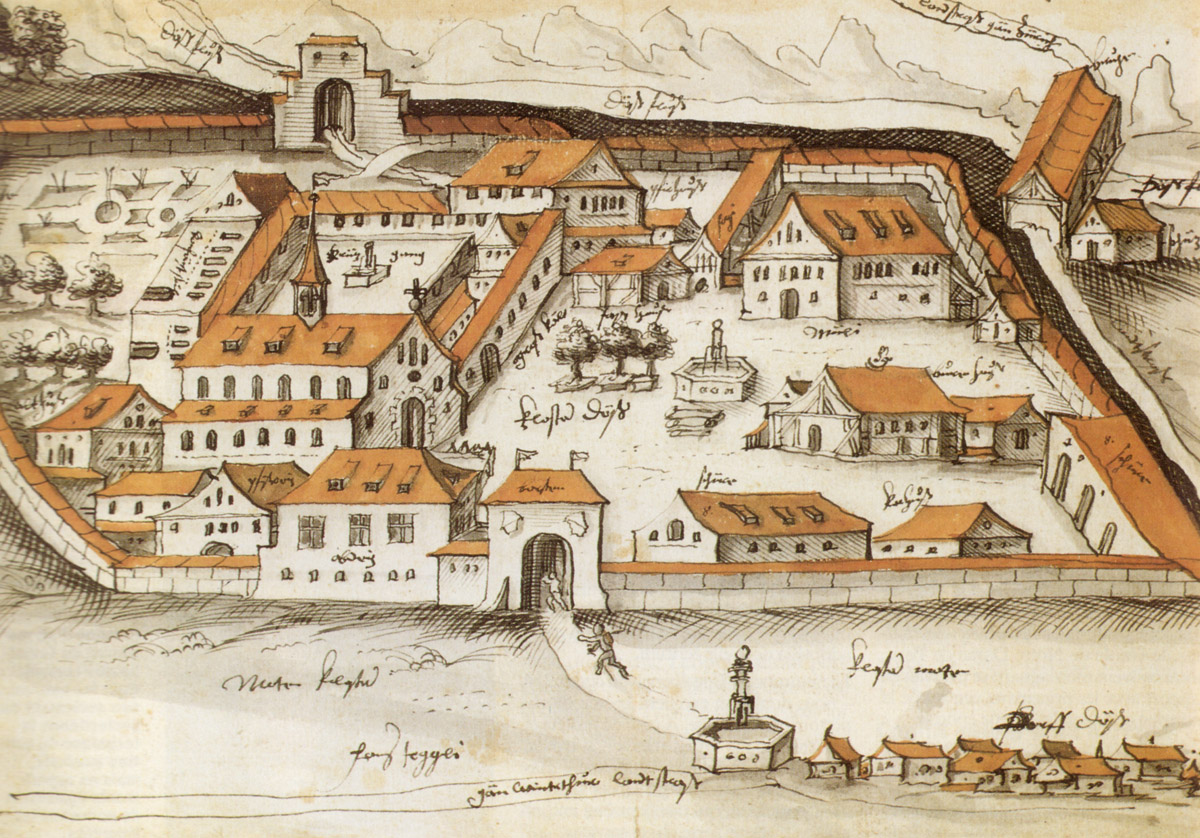
- The former Töss Monastery in a drawing by the historian Heinrich Murer (17th century)

- Location within Switzerland

Monastery information
- Order: Dominican
- Established: 1233
- Disestablished: 1525
- Mother house: Predigerkloster, Zürich

People
- Important associated figures: Elsbeth Stagel, Elizabeth of Hungary

Architecture
- Status: demolished

Site
- Location: Töss, Winterthur, Canton of Zürich
- Coordinates: 47.487658°N 8.70321°E

Töss Monastery was a community of Dominican nuns located in the former Swiss city of Töss, now a part of Winterthur. Nothing of the original buildings exists today.

Construction of the monastery began in 1233, near the bridge at the Töss River by command of Count Hartmann IV of Kyburg. In December of the same year, the monastery was confirmed by Bishop Heinrich von Tanne of Constance. In 1235 Pope Gregory IX placed it under the authority of the Predigerkloster in Zürich. Initially the nuns followed the Rule of St. Augustine but in 1245 it became a Dominican monastery. Over the following centuries, the monastery grew until it owned properties or incomes in about 130 communities around the Canton of Zürich. It was originally part of the Kyburg Herrschaft until 1264. It then passed to the Habsburgs until 1424, when the city of Zürich took over. Zürich held the monastery for less than two decades before it passed back to the Habsburgs in 1442. Finally, in 1452, the monastery returned to Zürich.

The monastery residence hall was begun in 1238 and finished in 1271. The monastery church was dedicated in 1240 by the Bishop of Constance. A new main altar and two side altars were dedicated in 1325, probably after the church was enlarged. The cloister was expanded and decorated with murals between 1468 and 1491. The 15th-century paintings were redone in 1613 and were copied in 1851 before it was demolished.

In the 14th century there were around 100 nuns at Töss. The Swiss mystic Elsbeth Stagel and the Blessed Elizabeth of Hungary, the last member of the House of Árpád, were both nuns of the monastery. Stagel was the prioress of Töss and may have written parts of the Lives of the Nuns of Töss, a sister-book containing biographies of 39 nuns and providing a comprehensive picture of mysticism at Töss.

This monastic community had a significant influence on Zurich during the Middle Ages but the influence diminished after the start of the Protestant Reformation in Switzerland about 1520. The monastery was closed soon thereafter, and the complex deteriorated as the centuries passed. The monastery's estates were nationalized and used to support the needy in the Canton and after 1606 a local school.

After the French Revolution, there were not sufficient resources to conserve the complex and the site was sold to Johan Jacob Rieter, who started Rieter Textile there. The former monastery church was demolished at the beginning of the 20th century.

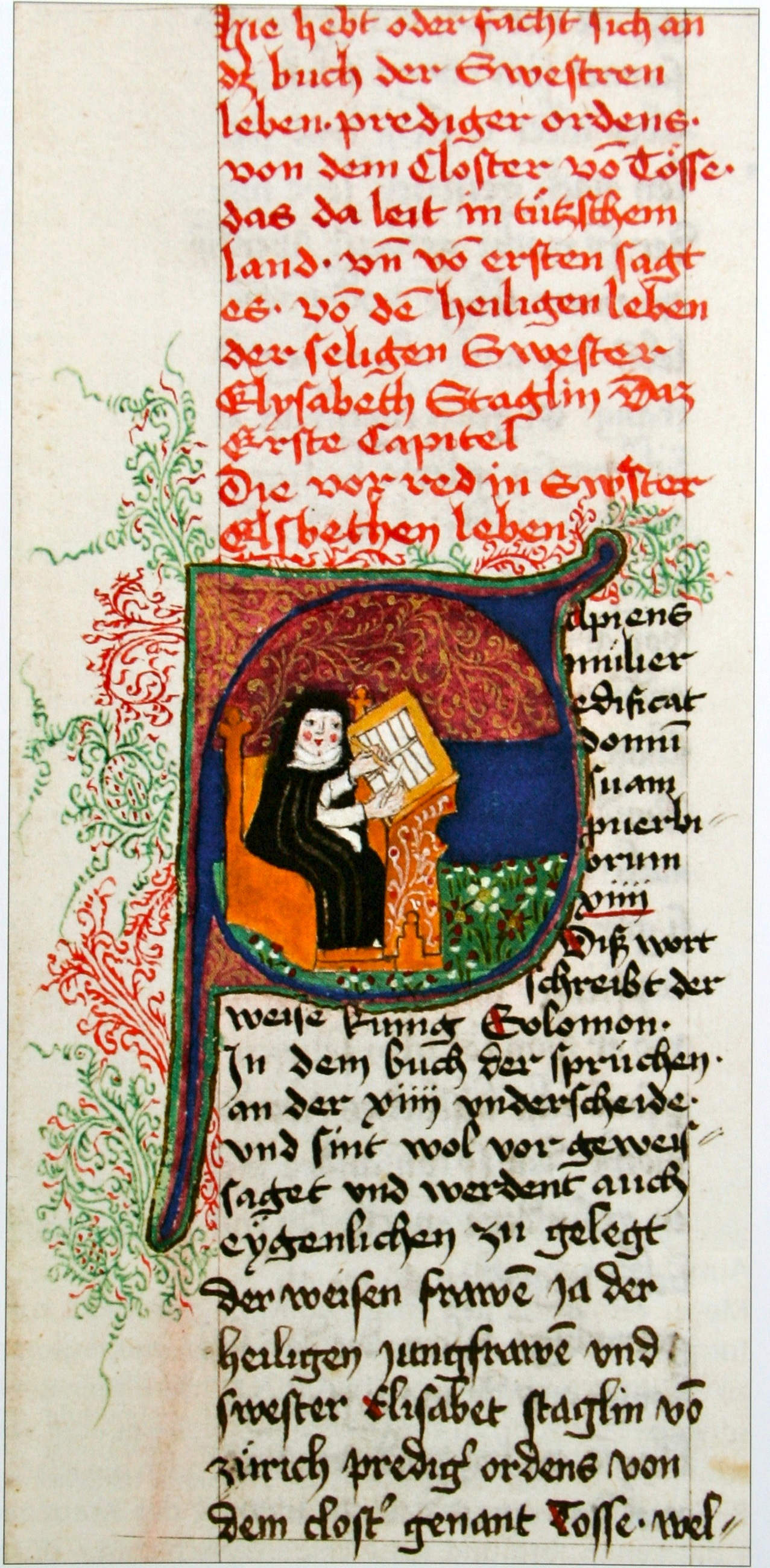
Elsbeth Stagel in the Lives of the Nuns of Töss

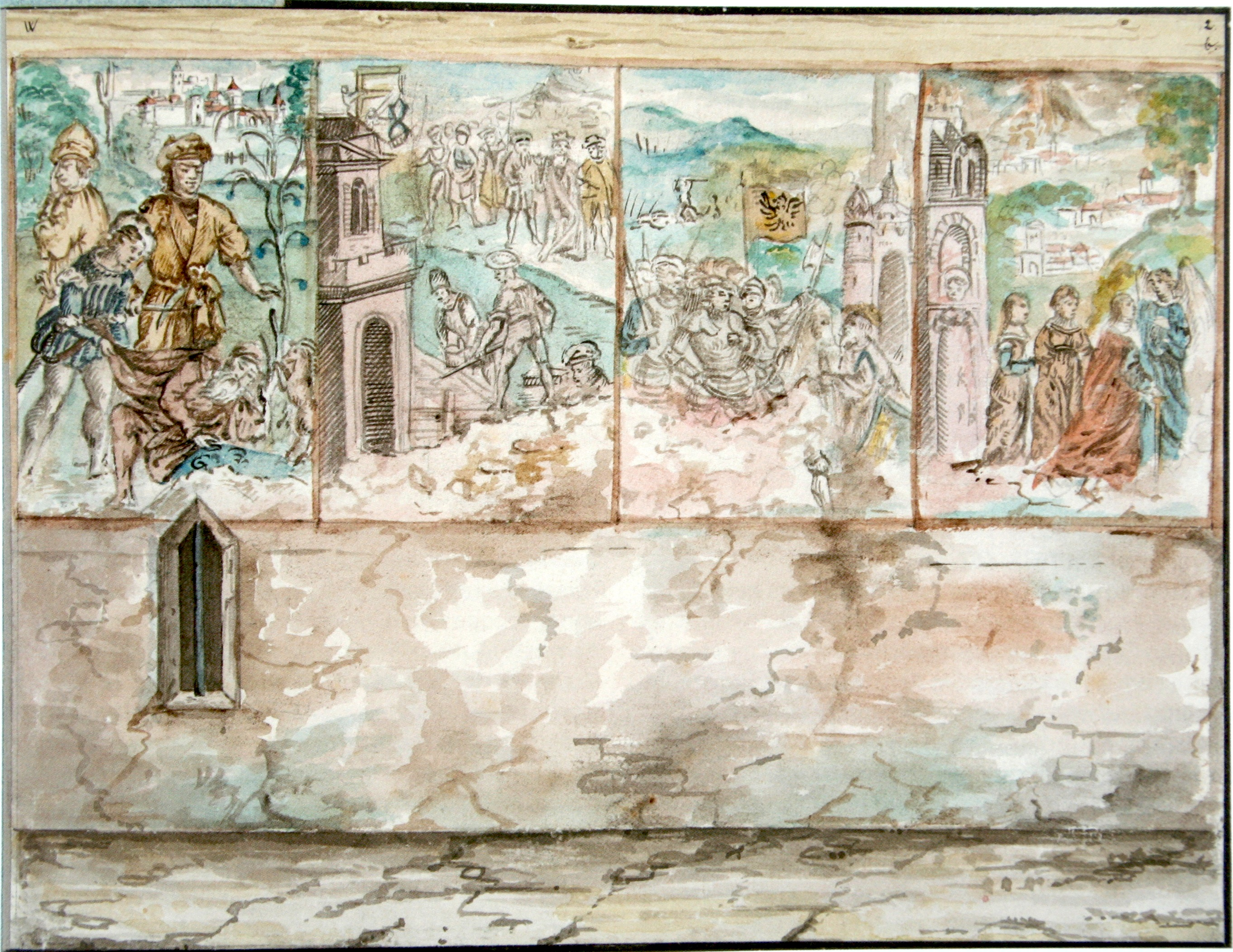
Reproductions of murals from the cloister, by Johann Conrad Werdmüller

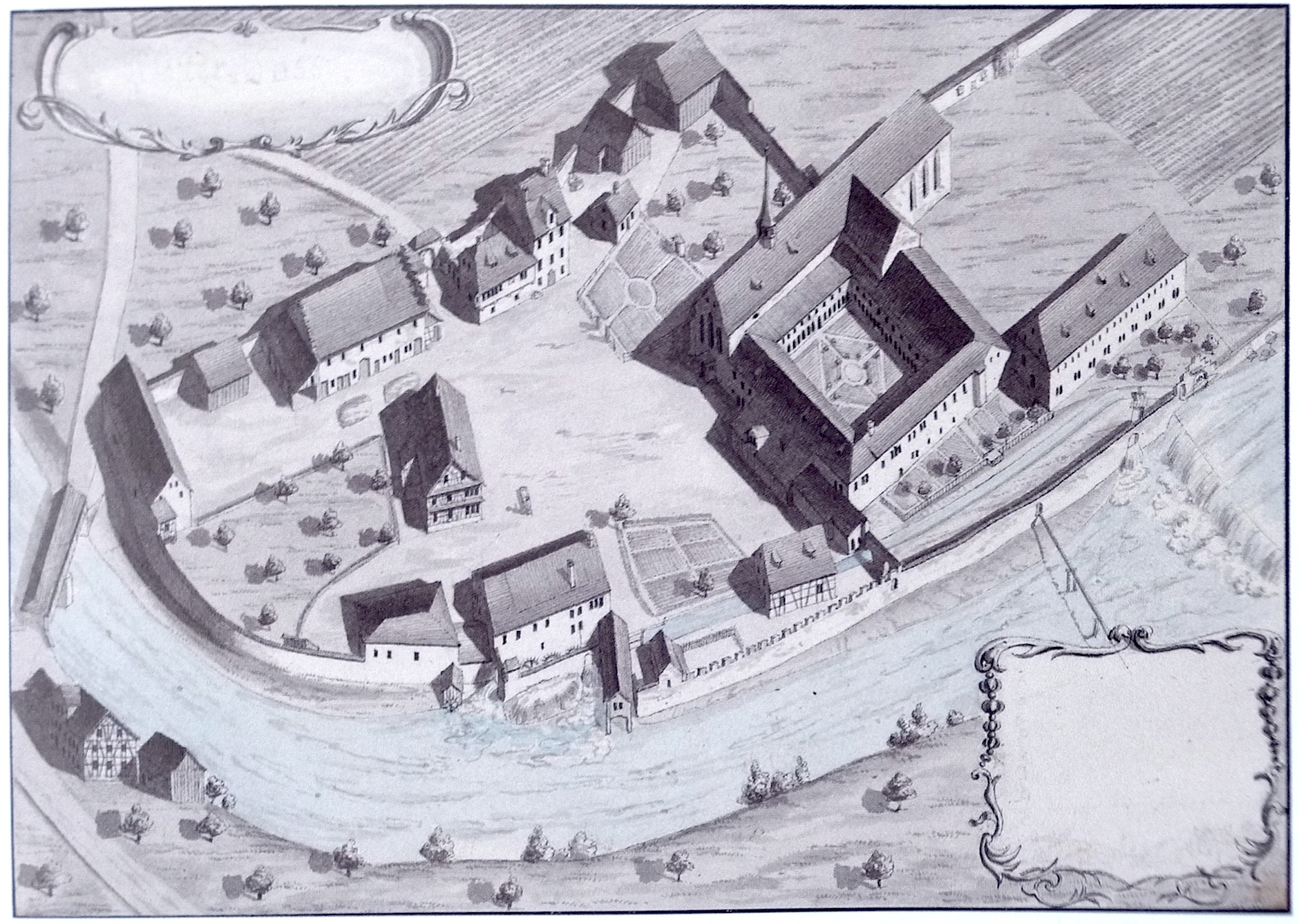
Monastery buildings in 1838

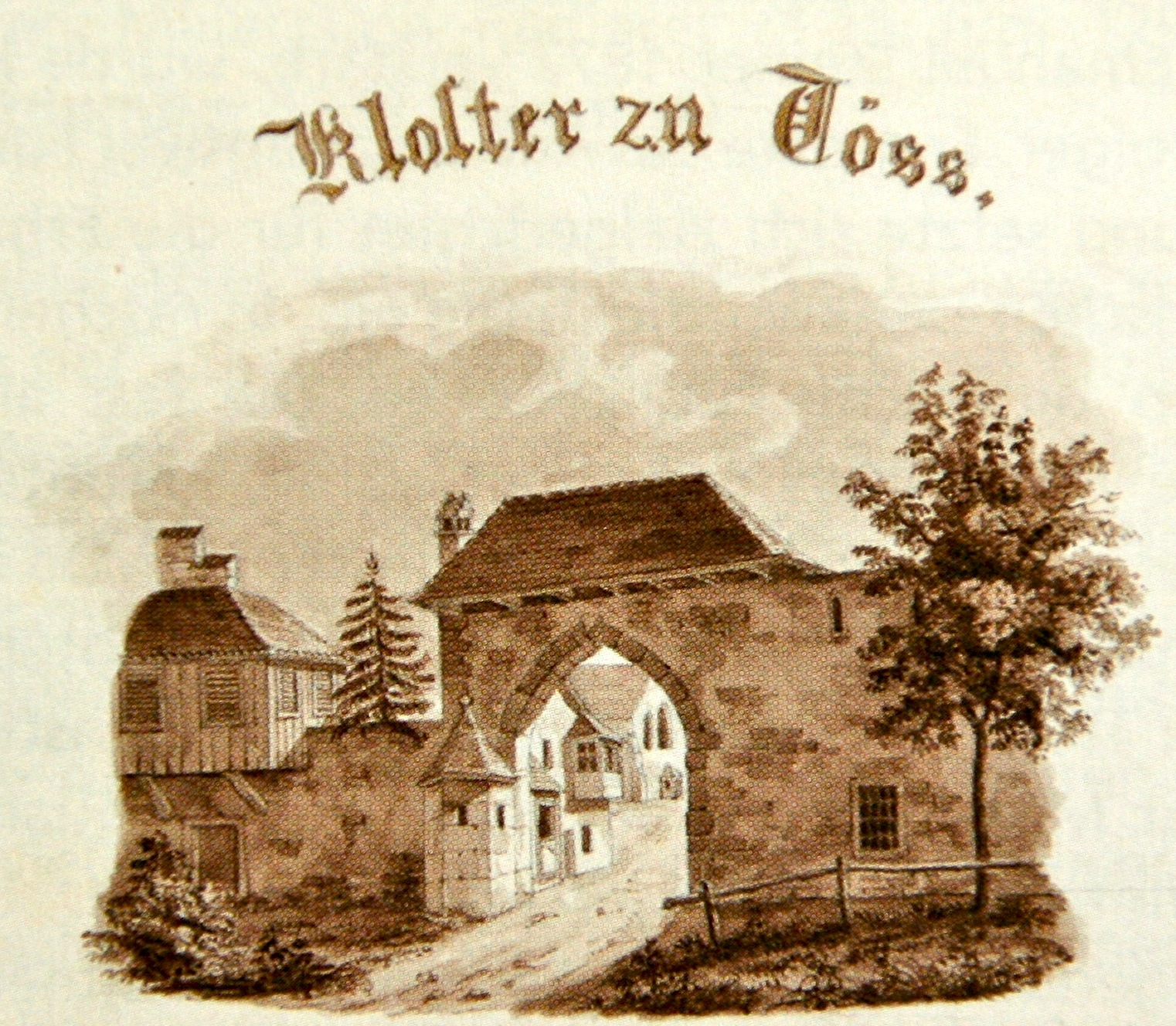
Front gate of the monastery
