= Johann Conrad Werdmüller =

Swiss illustrator and engraver

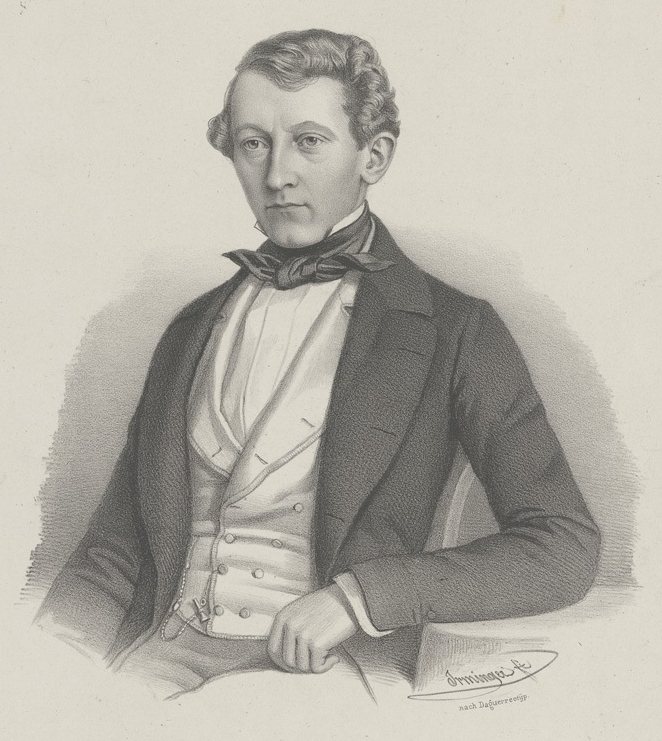
Johann Conrad Werdmüller; lithograph by Carl Friedrich Irminger (c. 1860)

Johann Conrad Werdmüller (10 November 1819, Zürich - 3 September 1892, Freiburg im Breisgau) was a Swiss illustrator and engraver.

== Biography ==
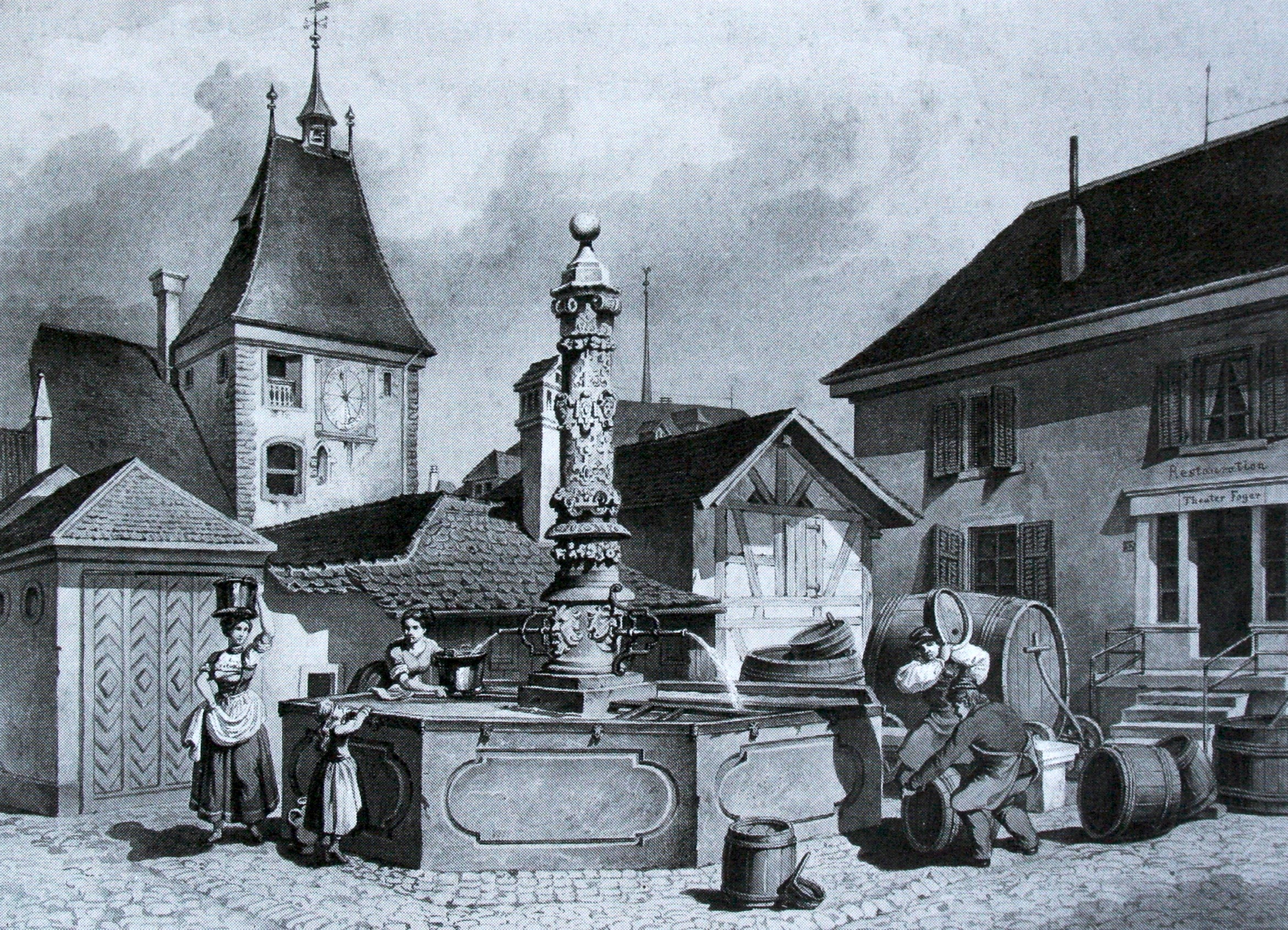
Fountain in the former Barfüsserkloster

He was the only son of Salomon Werdmüller and his wife Margarethe, née Bertschinger. They both died when he was still quite young, so he and his sister were raised in an orphanage. After finishing school, he served an apprenticeship with Georg Christoph Friedrich Oberkogler (1774-1856), an engraver. He was also taught lithography.

Upon completing his training there, he made copies of a large cycle of murals in the cloister of Töss Monastery, on behalf of Ludwig Schulthess, an engineer who wanted to preserve them before the cloister was demolished.

After 1838, he continued his education at the Academy of Fine Arts, Munich, where he became friends with Gottfried Keller, whose works he would later help illustrate. He also studied with the Swiss engraver, Samuel Amsler. From 1846 to 1848, he worked as independent engraver in Paris, working from the same building as Arnold Böcklin and Rudolf Koller. In 1848, he returned to Zürich.

In 1853, he discovered that he had a talent for teaching, after serving as a substitute teacher at the Industrieschule. After two years of teaching there, he was given an assignment to teach figure drawing as part of the preparatory course at the building school of the newly founded Polytechnikum. He held this position for thirty-five years. In addition, he worked at the High School for Women and at the University of Zürich. In the 1870s, he received a lifetime appointment as senior instructor at the Industrieschule.
