= Genealogia sanctae Hedwigis =

Genealogia sanctae Hedwigis is a medieval genealogy of Hedwig of Silesia which was included in Vita sanctae Hedwigis. It was written in 1300. The author of Genealogia was a Franciscan from Wrocław. There is a theory that the author was Henryk of Brena, a relative of Hedwig.
