= Alexandra Barratt =

New Zealand literary scholar (born 1945)

- Born: 1945

Academic background
- Theses: Fifteenth century lyrics on the Passion and their reading public (1969); Two Middle English translations of Aelred of Rievaulx's 'De Institutione Inclusaram' (1973)
- Doctoral advisor: A. G. Rigg

Alexandra Anne Talbot Barratt (née Carr) is a New Zealand academic, and is professor emerita at the University of Waikato. Barratt is a specialist in medieval manuscripts.

== Academic career ==
Barratt completed master's at Carleton University in 1969 followed by a PhD with her thesis titled Two Middle English translations of Aelred of Rievaulx's 'De Institutione Inclusaram' at the University of Toronto in 1973, supervised by A. G. Rigg. Barratt then joined the faculty of the University of Waikato, rising to full professor in 1997. During her time at Waikato, Barratt had been Chairperson of the English department, Chairperson of Humanities, and had served on the University Council as Academic Representative. She retired in 2010, and was appointed professor emerita in 2011, in recognition of more than thirty years of service and her "outstanding contribution to the university".

Barratt studied medieval manuscripts and has written nine books. She was responsible for identifying a 13th century psalter in the Alexander Turnbull library that had been misclassified as a fifteenth century Book of Hours. The Flemish psalter MSR-26, dated 1275–1300, was gifted to the Diocese of Wellington by William Burgoyne Hudson, brother of entomologist George Hudson. After her retirement, Barratt has been studying the 'manuscript waste' found in manuscripts and early printed books in New Zealand. For instance, Barratt was called on by Auckland Libraries to examine parchment strips that were found in the binding of a late 15th century printed German bible in their collection. Barratt identified the strips as 1200-year old bible fragments.

== Personal life ==
Barratt's parents were Frederick and Joan Carr. Her godmother was Dame Margot Fonteyn. She donated a Len Castle pot to the University in memory of her husband, scientist Robert Welch ONZM, who died in 2020.

== Selected works ==
- Barratt, Alexandra (2013). "What shall we pack? New Zealand Immigrants and their Manuscripts". Parergon. 30 (1): 73–90. doi:10.1353/pgn.2013.0061. Wikidata Q124625494.
- Barratt, Alexandra (2012). "11. Keeping Body and Soul Together: The Charge to the Barking Cellaress". pp. 235–244. doi:10.1515/9781782040507-015. Wikidata Q124625495 http://dx.doi.org/10.1515/9781782040507-015.
- Barratt, Alexandra (1979). "The textual tradition of the De institutis inclusarum of Aelred of Rievaulx". Revue d'histoire des textes. 8 (1978): 195–211. doi:10.3406/rht.1979.1175. Wikidata Q57482245.
- Barratt, Alexandra (2008). ‘No Such Sitting’: Julian Tropes the Trinity. pp. 42–52. doi:10.1017/9781846156229.004. ISBN 978-1-84615-622-9. Wikidata Q124625539.
- Barratt, Alexandra (2001). "Small Latin? The Post-Conquest Learning of English Religious Women". pp. 51–65. doi:10.1484/m.pjml-eb.3.877. Wikidata Q124625529 http://dx.doi.org/10.1484/m.pjml-eb.3.877.
- Barratt, Alexandra (1982). "A Reconstruction of an Old French Anthology of religious Prose". Romania. 103 (410): 371–373. doi:10.3406/roma.1982.2118. Wikidata Q57489271.
