= Iberg =

Iberg may refer to:

- Iberg (Allgäu Alps), a mountain in Germany
- Iberg (Harz), a hill in Germany
- Iberg (Upland), a mountain in Germany
- Iberg (Winterthur), a quarter in the Seen district of Winterthur, Switzerland
- Iberg Castle, St. Gallen, Switzerland
- Iberg Castle, Aargau, Switzerland
- Helge Iberg (born 1954), Norwegian contemporary composer

== See also ==
- Yberg, a mountain of Baden-Württemberg, Germany
- Bad Iburg, a town in Lower Saxony, Germany
