= Waldegg =

Waldegg may refer to:

- Waldegg (Uitikon), a village in the municipality of Uitikon in the Swiss canton of Zurich
- Waldegg (Wiener Neustadt-Land), a municipality in the Austrian province of Lower Austria
- Waldegg (Winterthur), a quarter of the city of Winterthur in the Swiss canton of Zurich
