= Gotzenwil =

Quarter of Winterthur, Switzerland

Coordinates: 47°28′24″N 8°46′31″E

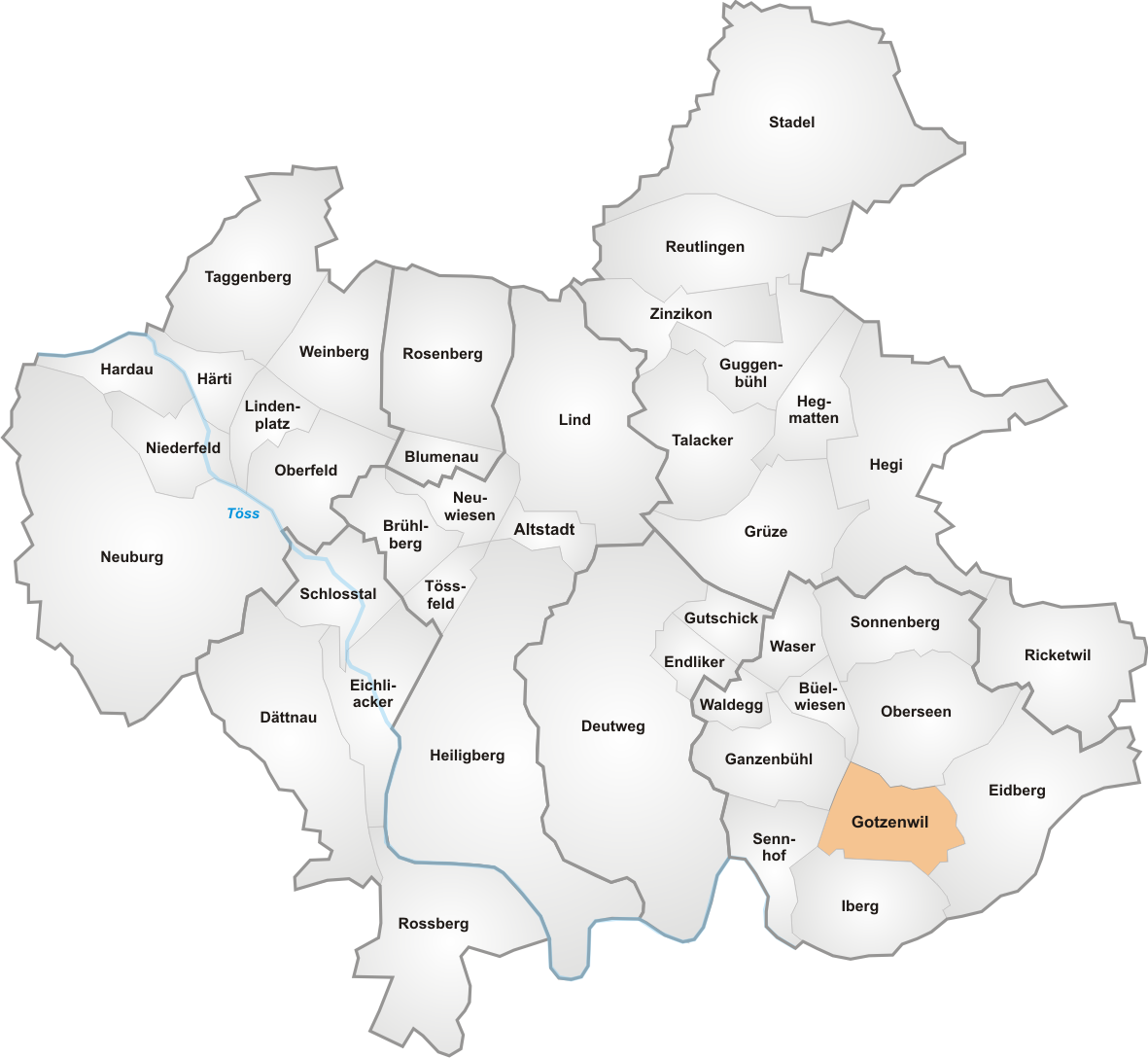
The quarter of Gotzenwil in Winterthur.

Gotzenwil is a quarter in the district 3 (Seen) of Winterthur.

It was formerly a part of Seen municipality, which was incorporated into Winterthur in 1922.
