= Eidberg =

Coordinates: 47°28′26″N 8°47′42″E

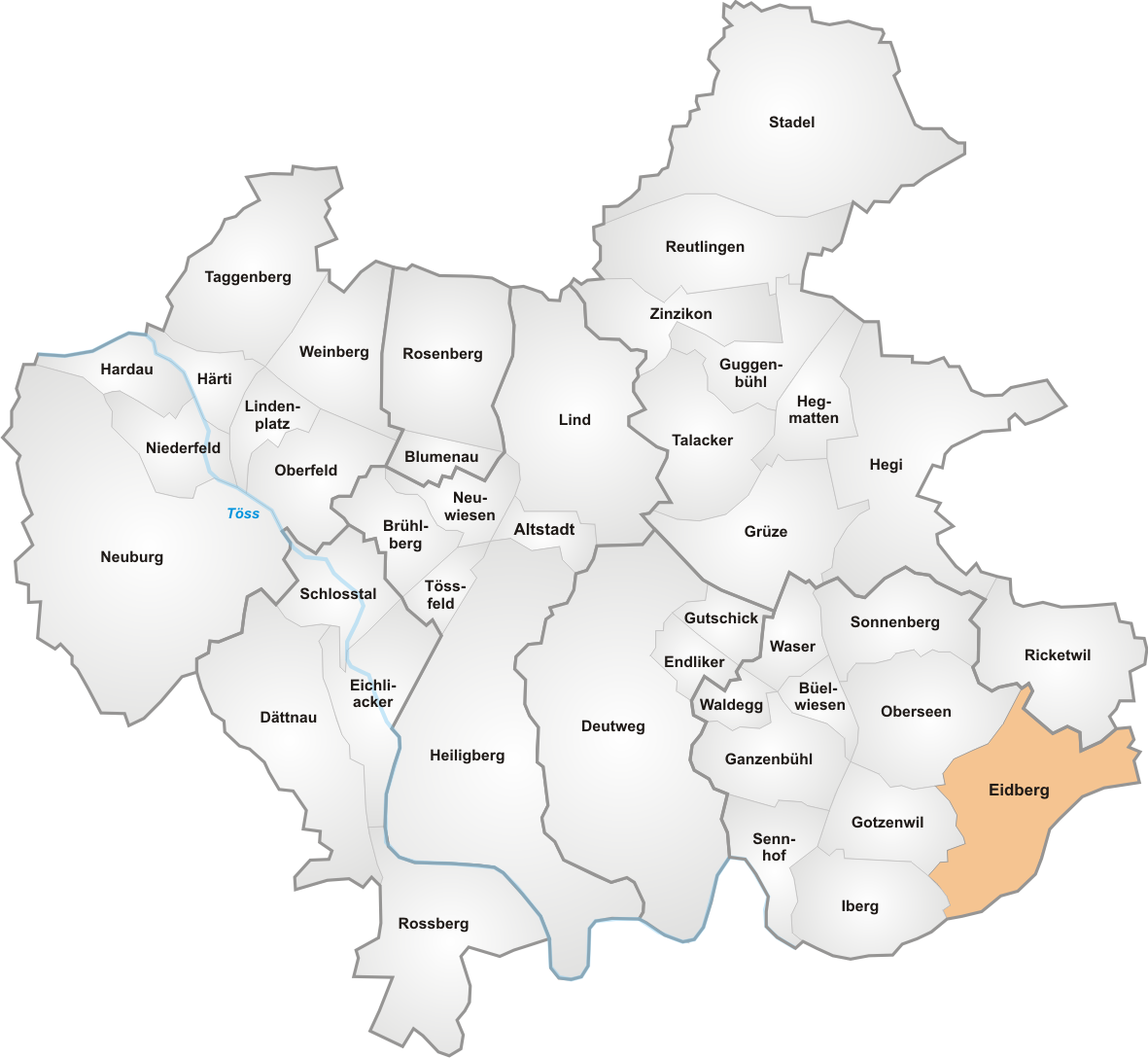
The quarter of Eidberg in Winterthur.

Eidberg is a quarter in the district 3 of Winterthur.

It was formerly a part of Seen municipality, which was incorporated into Winterthur in 1922.
