= Büelwiesen =

Coordinates: 47°28′59″N 8°45′54″E

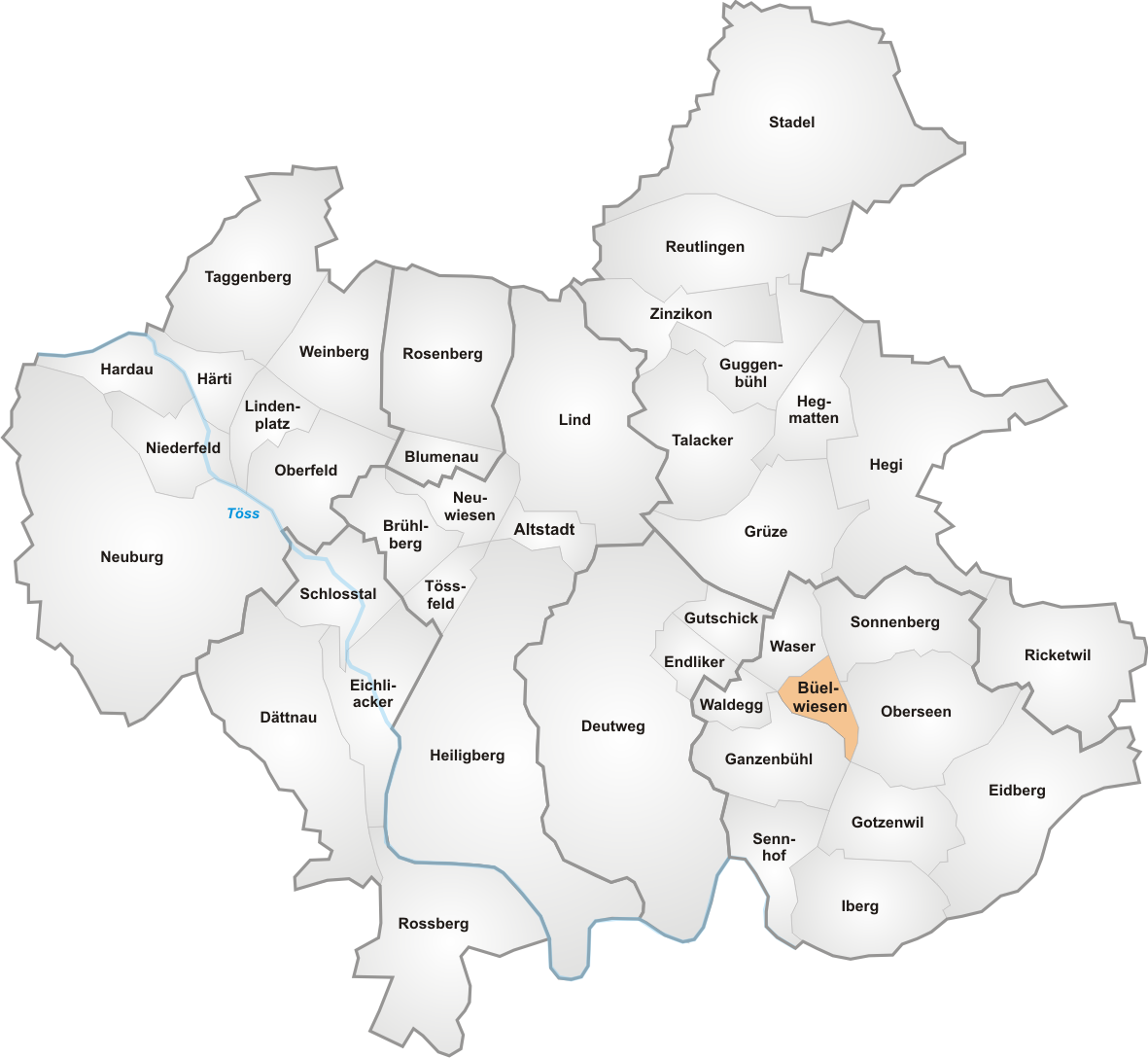
The quarter of Büelwiesen in Winterthur.

Büelwiesen is a quarter in the district 3 (Seen) of Winterthur.

It was part of Seen municipality until amalgamation into Winterthur in 1922.
