= Seen (Winterthur) =

Seen District of the city of Winterthur
- District
- Flag Seal

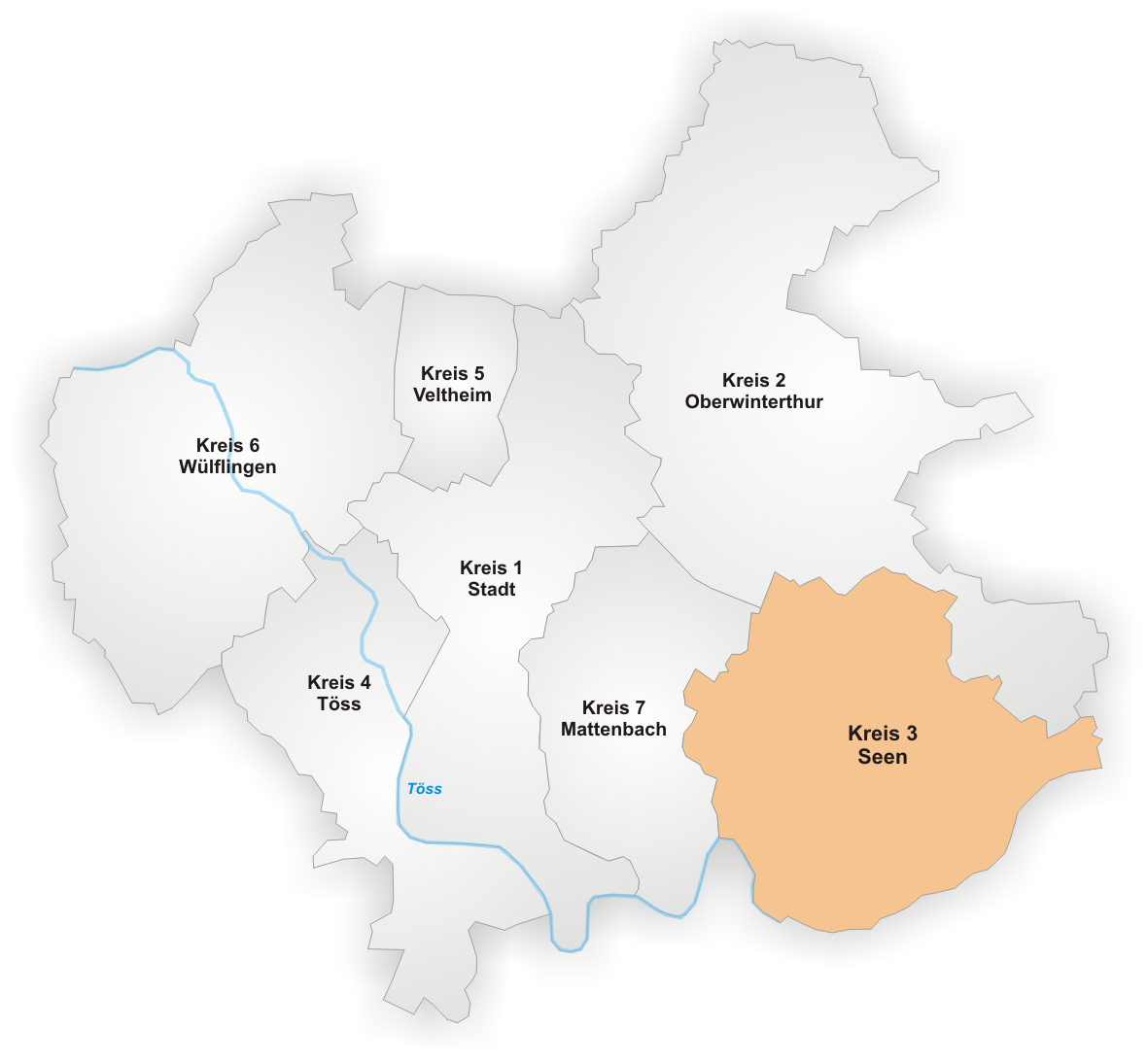
- Coordinates: 47.476°N 8.770°E
- Country: Switzerland
- Canton: Zürich
- City: Winterthur
- first mentioned: 774
- Incorporated: 1922

Area
  - Total: 11.01 km^{2} (4.25 sq mi)

Population (31 Dec 2012)
  - Total: 17,630
  - Density: 1,555/km^{2} (4,030/sq mi)
- Postal code: 8405, 8482
- District number: 3
- Quarters: Waser; Büelwiesen; Waldegg; Ganzenbühl; Sonnenberg; Oberseen; Gotzenwil; Eidberg; Iberg; Sennhof

Seen (German pronunciation: [ˈzeːən]) is a district in the Swiss city of Winterthur. It is district number 3.

The district comprises the quarters Waser, Büelwiesen, Waldegg, Ganzenbühl, Sonnenberg, Ricketwil, Oberseen, Gotzenwil, Eidberg, Iberg and Sennhof.

Aerial view from 300 m by Walter Mittelholzer (1920)

Seen was formerly a municipality of its own, but was incorporated into Winterthur in 1922.

== Transport ==
Winterthur-Seen railway station is a stop of the S-Bahn Zürich on the line S11 and S26.

The station is also a terminus of line 2 of the Winterthur trolleybus system.
