= Ganzenbühl =

Coordinates: 47°28′50″N 8°45′47″E

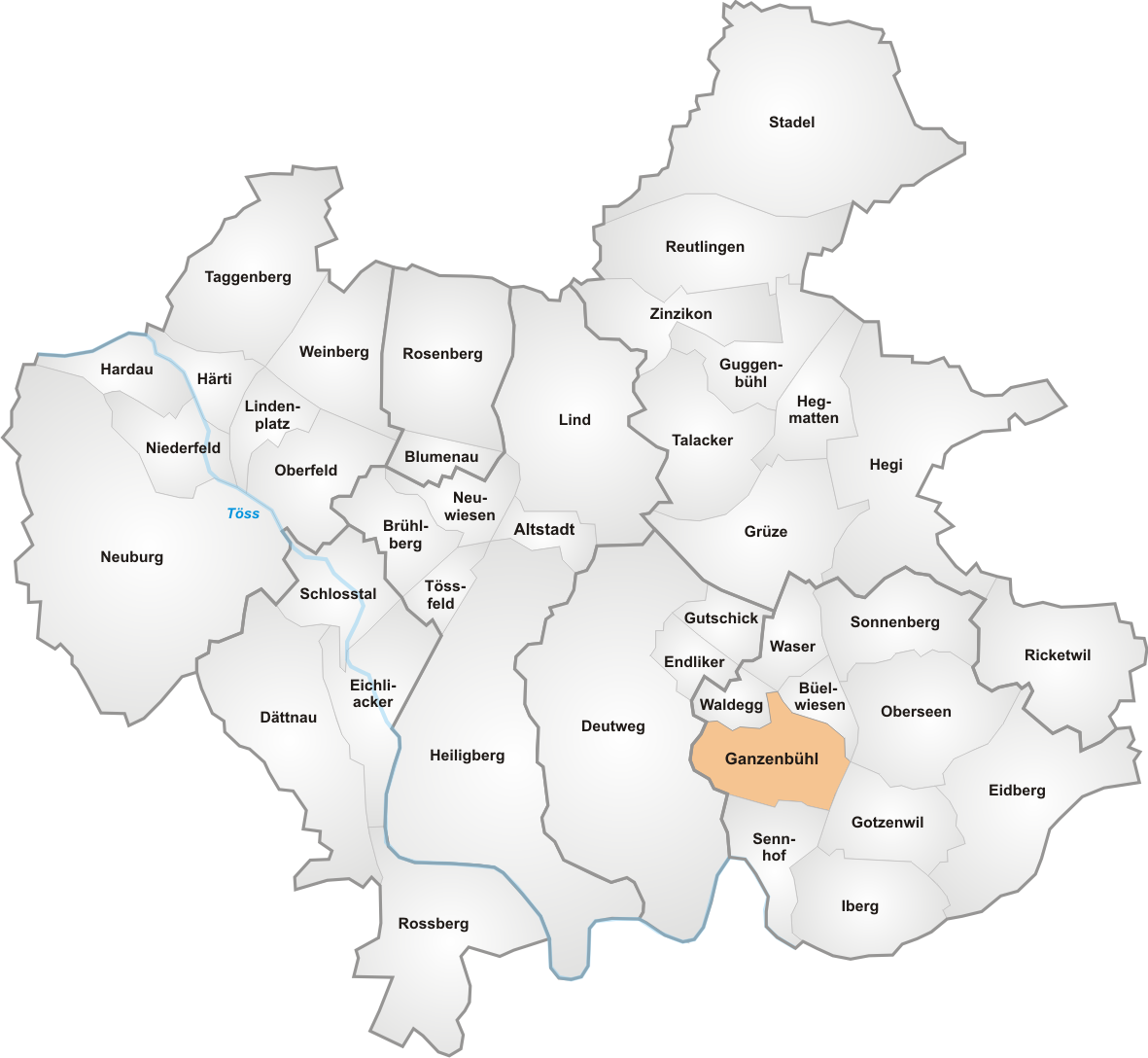
The quarter of Ganzenbühl in Winterthur.

Ganzenbühl is a quarter in the district 3 (Seen) of Winterthur.

It was formerly a part of Seen municipality, which was incorporated into Winterthur in 1922.
