= Sennhof (Winterthur) =

Coordinates: 47°28′2″N 8°45′35″E

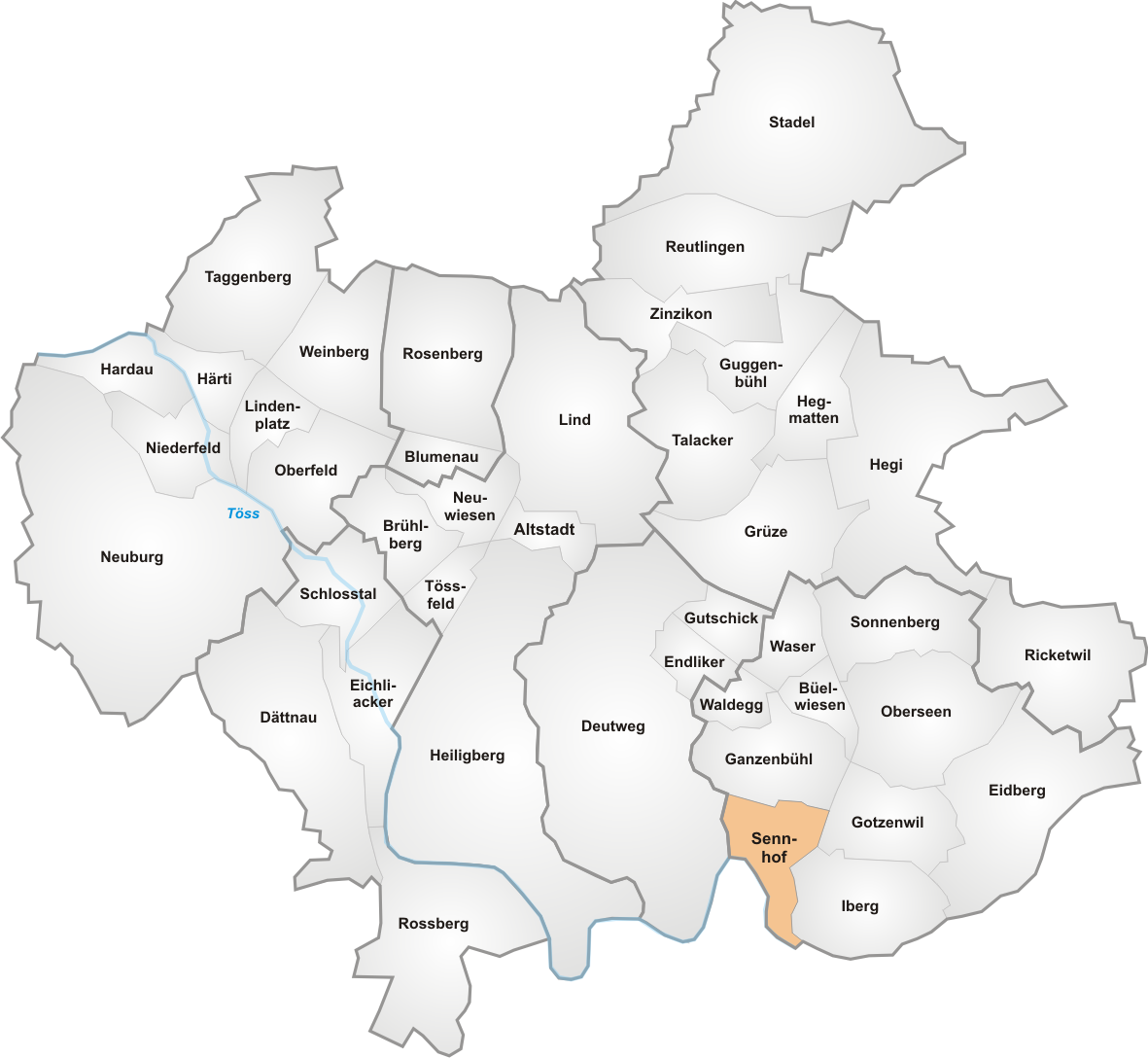
The quarter of Sennhof in Winterthur.

Sennhof is a quarter in the district 3 (Seen) of Winterthur.

It was formerly a part of Seen municipality, which was incorporated into Winterthur in 1922.

Sennhof-Kyburg railway station is a stop of the Zurich S-Bahn service S26.
