= Oberseen =

Coordinates: 47°28′46″N 8°46′30″E

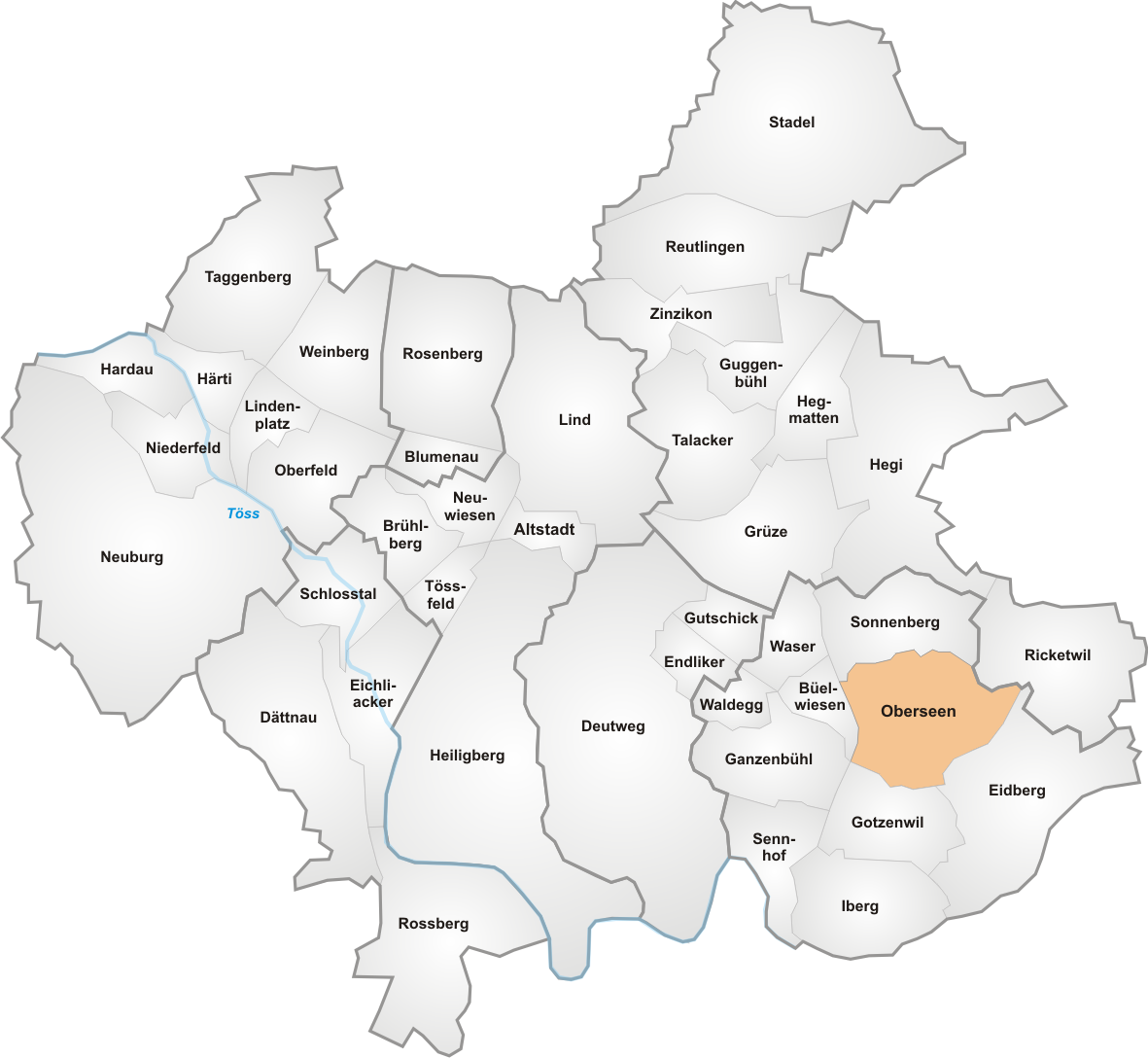
The quarter of Oberseen in Winterthur.

Oberseen is a quarter in the district 3 of Winterthur.

It was formerly a part of Seen municipality, which was incorporated into Winterthur in 1922.
