= Iberg (Upland) =

Mountain in Hesse, Germany

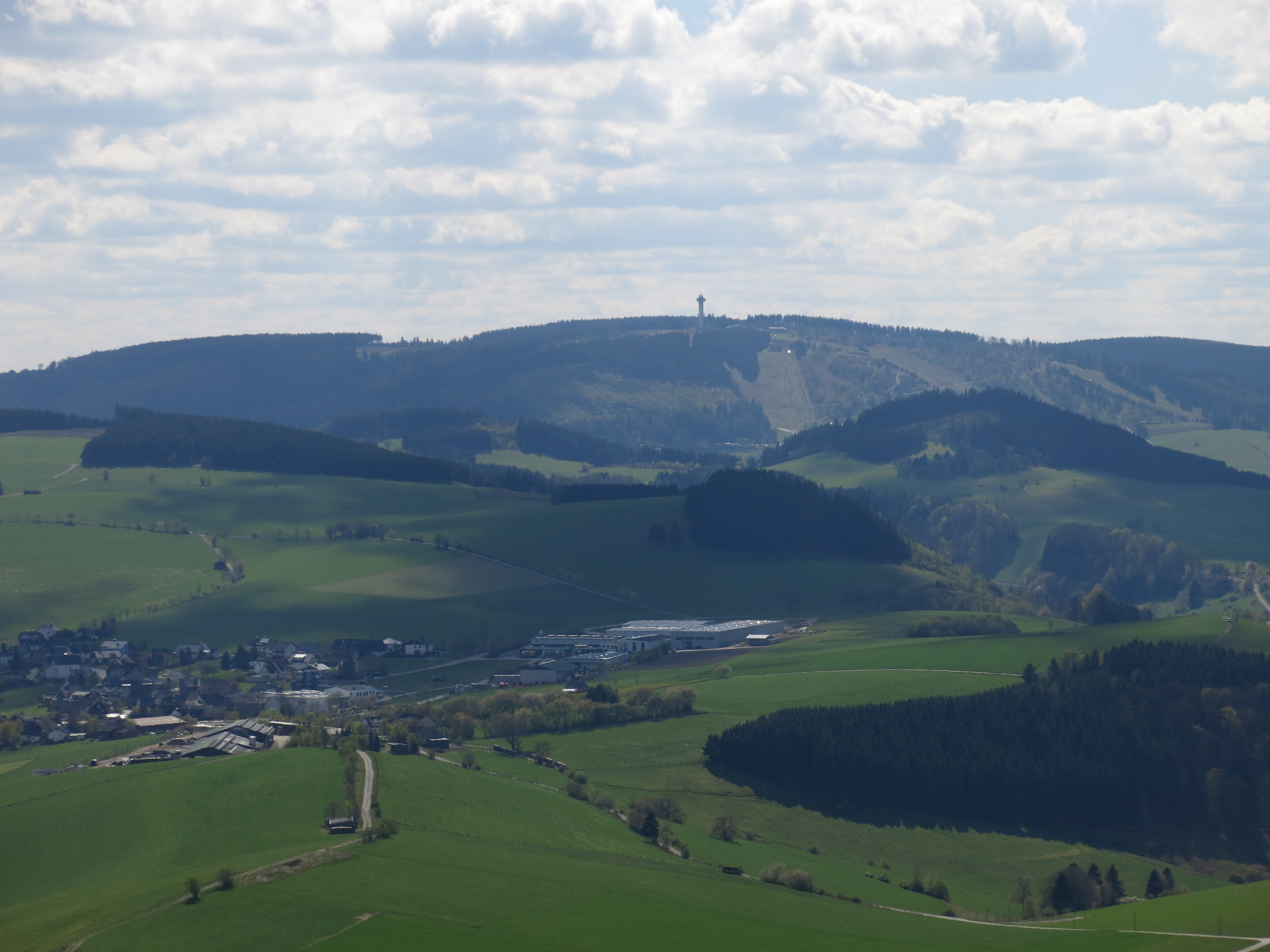

Highest point
- Elevation: 720.5 m (2,364 ft)
- Listing: Mountains and hills of Hesse
- Coordinates: 51°17′48″N 8°37′04″E

Geography
- Location within Hesse
- Location: Landkreis Waldeck-Frankenberg, Hesse, Germany

Iberg is a mountain of Landkreis Waldeck-Frankenberg, Hesse, Germany.
