= Iberg (Winterthur) =

Coordinates: 47°27′52″N 8°46′41″E

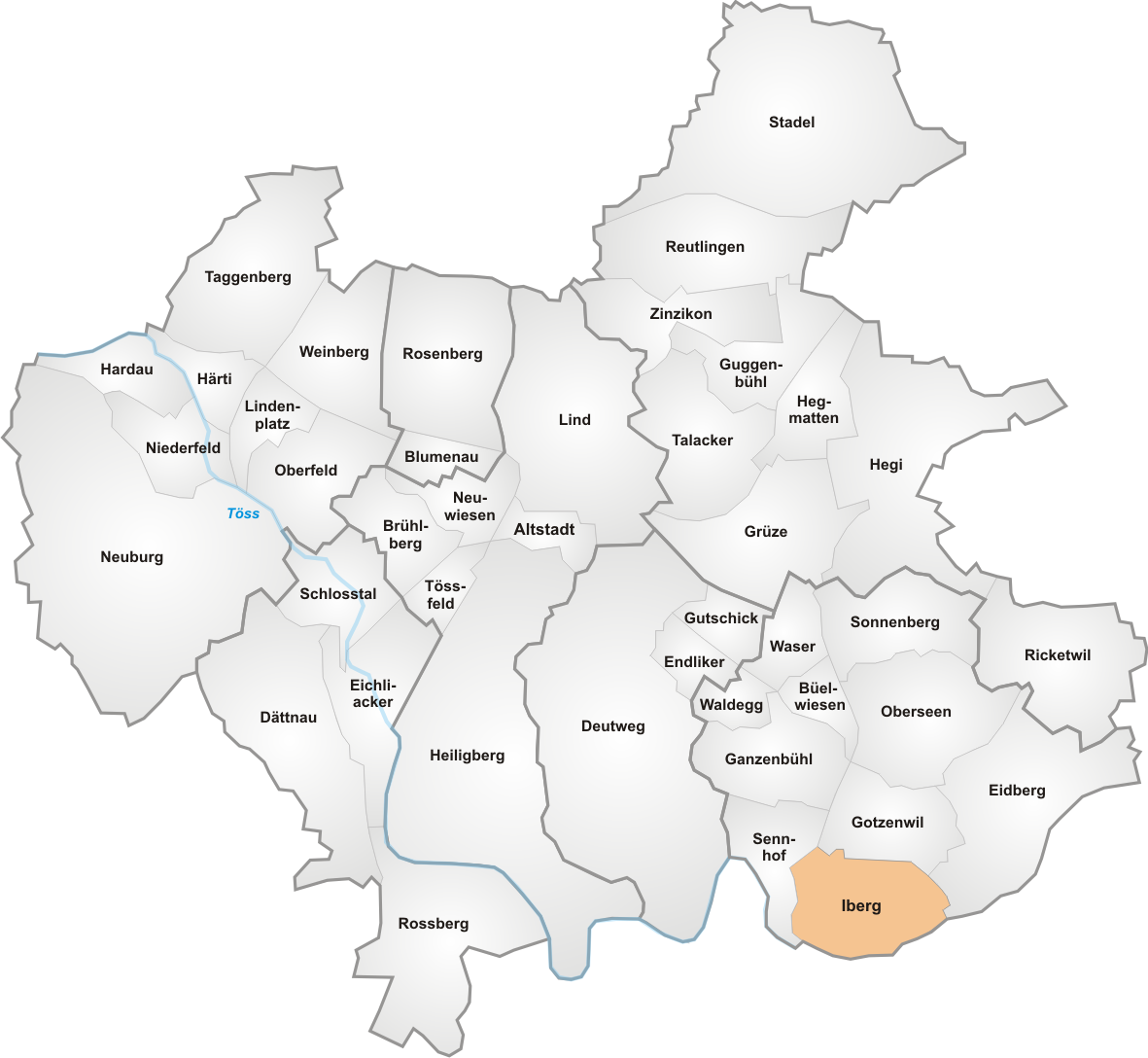
The quarter of Iberg in Winterthur.

Iberg is a quarter in district 3 (Seen) of Winterthur.

It was formerly a part of the Seen municipality, which was incorporated into Winterthur in 1922.
