= Waldegg (Winterthur) =

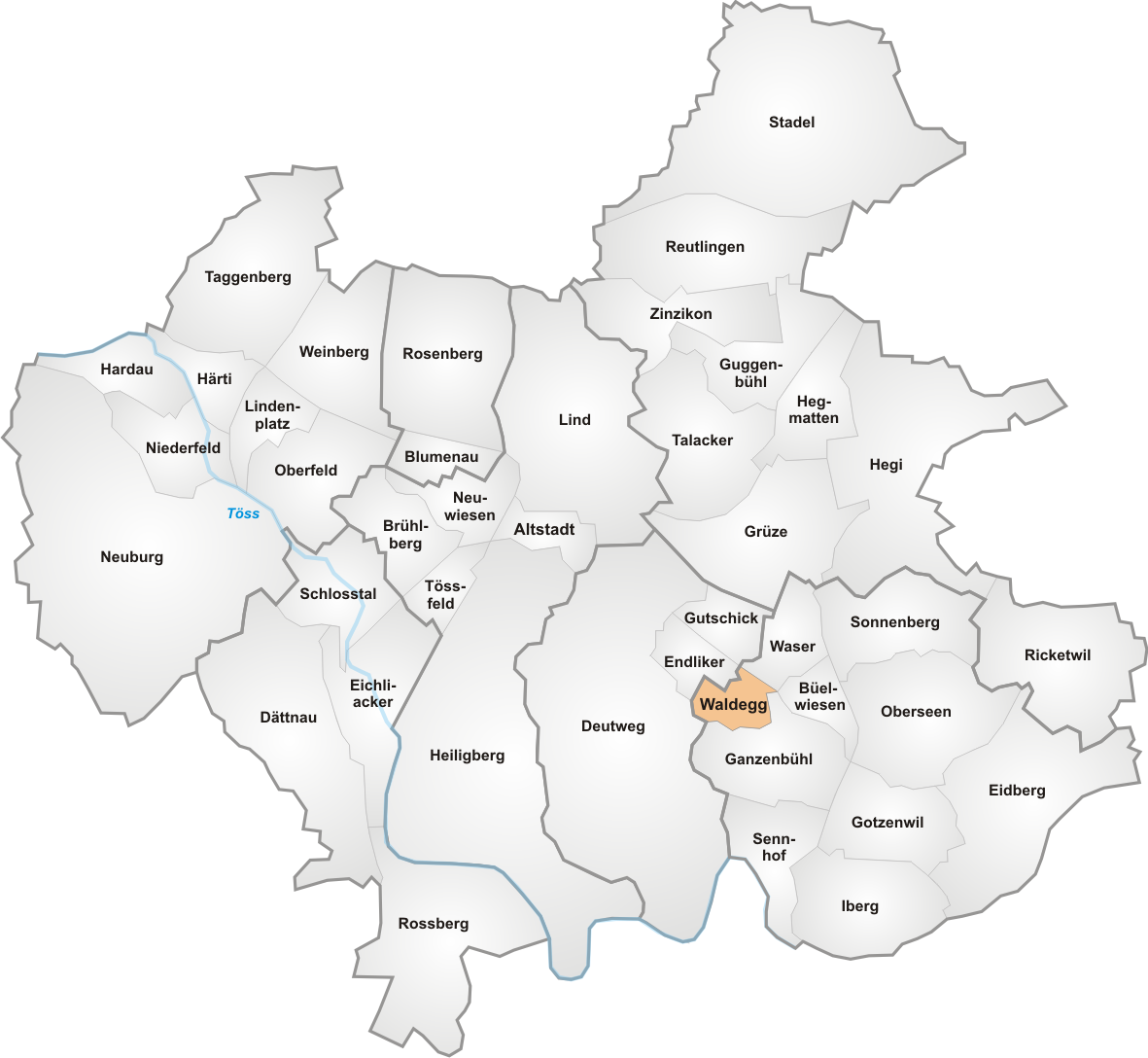
The quarter of Waldegg in Winterthur.

Waldegg is a quarter in the district 3 (Seen) of Winterthur.

It was a part of Seen municipality that was incorporated into Winterthur in 1922.
