= Eschlikon =

- Municipality
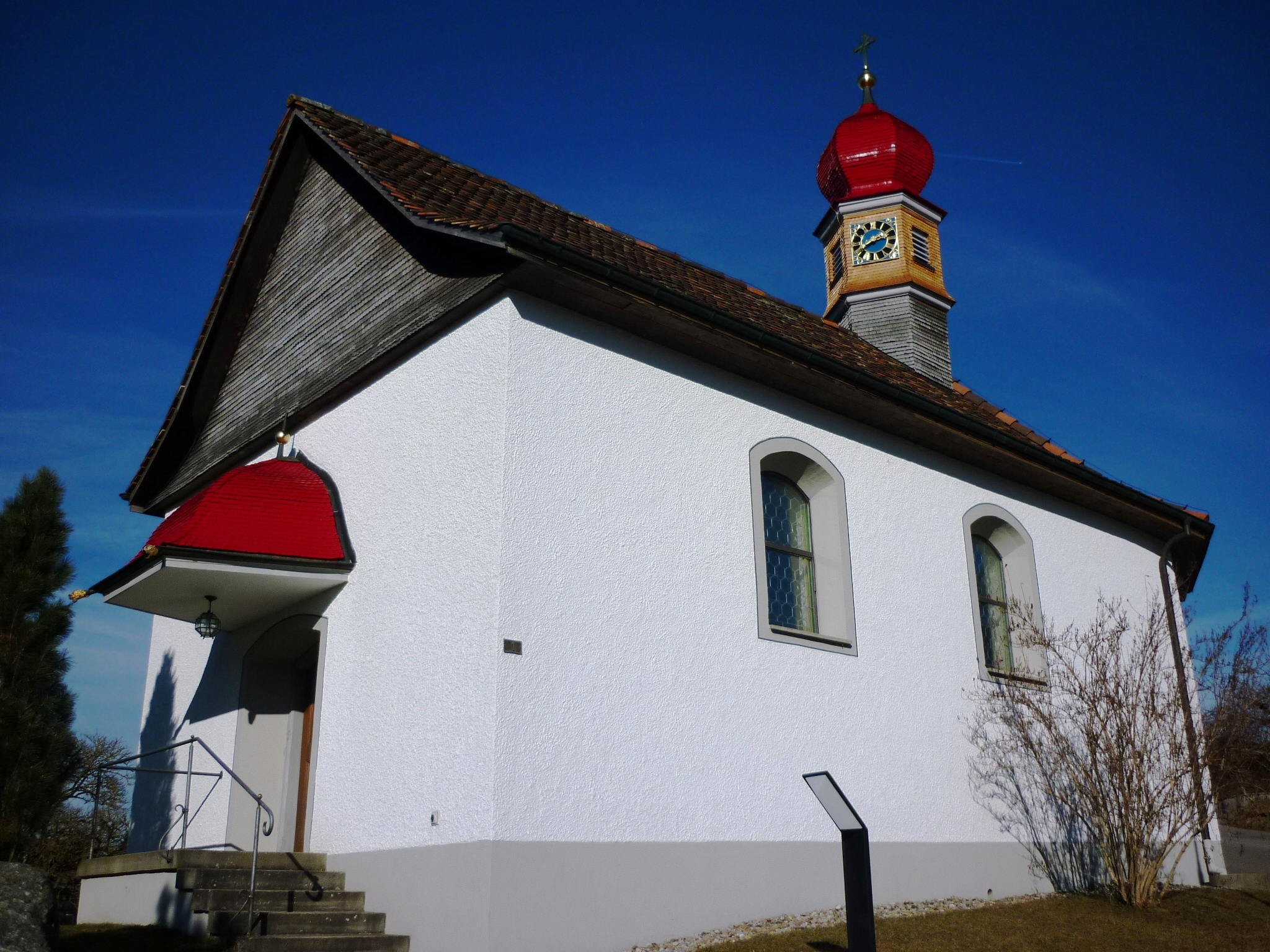

- Coat of arms
- Location of Eschlikon
- Location within Switzerland Location within Canton of Thurgau
- Coordinates: 47°27′N 8°57′E
- Country: Switzerland
- Canton: Thurgau
- District: Münchwilen

Area
  - Total: 6.21 km^{2} (2.40 sq mi)
- Elevation: 570 m (1,870 ft)

Population (December 2007)
  - Total: 3,690
  - Density: 594/km^{2} (1,540/sq mi)
- Time zone: UTC+01:00 (CET)
  - Summer (DST): UTC+02:00 (CEST)
- Postal code: 8360
- SFOS number: 4724
- ISO 3166 code: CH-TG
- Surrounded by: Bichelsee-Balterswil, Fischingen, Münchwilen, Sirnach, Wängi
- Website: www.eschlikon.ch

Eschlikon is a municipality in the district of Münchwilen in the canton of Thurgau in Switzerland.

== History ==
Eschlikon is first mentioned in 1280 as Aeslikon. During the Middle Ages, most of Eschlikon (except for the farms of a few free peasants) belonged to the monastery of Magdenau and Heiliggeistspital in St. Gallen. Eschlikon was part of the high courts of Tuttwilerberg. From the Late Middle Ages until 1798 it was the home of the Swiss Confederation Governor in Thurgau or his appointed Vogt.

The village church was originally part of the Sirnach parish. In 1529, the majority of the population converted to the new religion during the Protestant Reformation. The Reformed majority separated from Sirnach parish in 1936, and formed a new parish with Münchwilen, Oberhofen, St. Margaret and Wallenwil. The Catholic population belongs to the parish of Sirnach.

Aerial view from 800 m by Walter Mittelholzer (1927)

In addition to farming, viticulture and peat extraction, cattle and dairy farming became a major industry in the 2nd half of the 19th century. Through the 18th to 20th century various branches of the textile industry grew into the village economy. After the linen industry, cotton mills opened in the 19th century. Between 1870 and 1930, embroidery and knitwear production were important in the local economy. Between 1898 and 1962 the Weibel brick factory operated. In 1875, the citizens of a municipality opened a bank to provide loans, cattle loans and savings. However, the bank failed in 1912, which severely damaged the municipality. Between 1864 and 1973 the regional newspaper Volksblatt vom Hörnli was published in Eschlikon. Since the mid-20th century a number of new industrial and commercial enterprises (such as metal goods factory Spring, with 200 employees) have settled in the formerly small rural village and changed its character.

== Geography ==
Eschlikon has an area, as of 2009, of 6.21 square kilometers (2.40 sq mi). Of this area, 3.88 km^{2} (1.50 sq mi) or 62.5% is used for agricultural purposes, while 1.15 km^{2} (0.44 sq mi) or 18.5% is forested. Of the rest of the land, 1.1 km^{2} (0.42 sq mi) or 17.7% is settled (buildings or roads), 0.02 km^{2} (4.9 acres) or 0.3% is either rivers or lakes.

Of the built up area, industrial buildings made up 10.0% of the total area while housing and buildings made up 2.3% and transportation infrastructure made up 0.8%. while parks, green belts and sports fields made up 3.9%. Out of the forested land, all of the forested land area is covered with heavy forests. Of the agricultural land, 59.6% is used for growing crops, while 2.9% is used for orchards or vine crops. All the water in the municipality is in lakes.

The municipality is located in the Münchwilen district, on the south-east foot of the Tuttwilerberg along the Aadorf-Wil road. It consists of the linear village of Eschlikon and the hamlets of Wallenwil and Hurnen.

== Demographics ==
Eschlikon has a population (as of December 2020) of 4,577. As of 2008, 11.9% of the population are foreign nationals. Over the last 10 years (1997–2007) the population has changed at a rate of 21.7%. Most of the population (as of 2000) speaks German (92.8%), with Italian being second most common ( 1.9%) and Albanian being third ( 1.3%).

As of 2008, the gender distribution of the population was 51.0% male and 49.0% female. The population was made up of 1,694 Swiss men (45.0% of the population), and 228 (6.1%) non-Swiss men. There were 1,624 Swiss women (43.1%), and 220 (5.8%) non-Swiss women.

In 2008 there were 29 live births to Swiss citizens and 1 birth to non-Swiss citizens, and in same time span there were 22 deaths of Swiss citizens and 2 non-Swiss citizen deaths. Ignoring immigration and emigration, the population of Swiss citizens increased by 7 while the foreign population decreased by 1. There was 1 Swiss man, 3 Swiss women who emigrated from Switzerland to another country, 18 non-Swiss men who emigrated from Switzerland to another country and 13 non-Swiss women who emigrated from Switzerland to another country. The total Swiss population change in 2008 (from all sources) was an increase of 38 and the non-Swiss population change was an increase of 41 people. This represents a population growth rate of 2.1%.

The age distribution, as of 2009, in Eschlikon is; 408 children or 10.7% of the population are between 0 and 9 years old and 495 teenagers or 13.0% are between 10 and 19. Of the adult population, 488 people or 12.8% of the population are between 20 and 29 years old. 469 people or 12.3% are between 30 and 39, 673 people or 17.7% are between 40 and 49, and 555 people or 14.6% are between 50 and 59. The senior population distribution is 366 people or 9.6% of the population are between 60 and 69 years old, 220 people or 5.8% are between 70 and 79, there are 116 people or 3.0% who are between 80 and 89, and there are 18 people or 0.5% who are 90 and older.

As of 2000, there were 1,248 private households in the municipality, and an average of 2.5 persons per household. In 2000 there were 561 single family homes (or 82.5% of the total) out of a total of 680 inhabited buildings. There were 56 two family buildings (8.2%), 13 three family buildings (1.9%) and 50 multi-family buildings (or 7.4%). There were 789 (or 25.2%) persons who were part of a couple without children, and 1,698 (or 54.2%) who were part of a couple with children. There were 162 (or 5.2%) people who lived in single parent home, while there are 18 persons who were adult children living with one or both parents, 29 persons who lived in a household made up of relatives, 14 who lived in a household made up of unrelated persons, and 74 who are either institutionalized or live in another type of collective housing.

The vacancy rate for the municipality, in 2008, was 0.44%. As of 2007, the construction rate of new housing units was 12.2 new units per 1000 residents. In 2000 there were 1,368 apartments in the municipality. The most common apartment size was the 4 room apartment of which there were 355. There were 13 single room apartments and 262 apartments with six or more rooms. As of 2000 the average price to rent an average apartment in Eschlikon was 1072.65 Swiss francs (CHF) per month (US$860, £480, €690 approx. exchange rate from 2000). The average rate for a one-room apartment was 460.00 CHF (US$370, £210, €290), a two-room apartment was about 791.76 CHF (US$630, £360, €510), a three-room apartment was about 930.92 CHF (US$740, £420, €600) and a six or more room apartment cost an average of 1536.62 CHF (US$1230, £690, €980). The average apartment price in Eschlikon was 96.1% of the national average of 1116 CHF.

In the 2007 federal election the most popular party was the SVP which received 38.27% of the vote. The next three most popular parties were the CVP (18.12%), the FDP (12.24%) and the Green Party (11.85%). In the federal election, a total of 1,281 votes were cast, and the voter turnout was 49.8%.

The historical population is given in the following table:

year	population
1850	422
1900	640
1950	1,026
1990	1,814
2000	3,133
2004	3,456
2011	3,948

== Sights ==
Its Catholic church from 1963 contains two stained glass windows by Yoki Aebischer (1964).

== Economy ==
As of 2007, Eschlikon had an unemployment rate of 1.46%. As of 2005, there were 46 people employed in the primary economic sector and about 17 businesses involved in this sector. 524 people are employed in the secondary sector and there are 51 businesses in this sector. 494 people are employed in the tertiary sector, with 120 businesses in this sector.

In 2000 there were 2,178 workers who lived in the municipality. Of these, 1,118 or about 51.3% of the residents worked outside Eschlikon while 583 people commuted into the municipality for work. There were a total of 1,643 jobs (of at least 6 hours per week) in the municipality. Of the working population, 14.4% used public transportation to get to work, and 51.9% used a private car.

== Religion ==
From the 2000 census, 1,209 or 38.6% were Roman Catholic, while 1,282 or 40.9% belonged to the Swiss Reformed Church. Of the rest of the population, there were 4 Old Catholics (or about 0.13% of the population) who belonged to the Christian Catholic Church of Switzerland, there are 23 individuals (or about 0.73% of the population) who belong to the Orthodox Church, and there are 137 individuals (or about 4.37% of the population) who belong to another Christian church. There were 2 individuals (or about 0.06% of the population) who were Jewish, and 138 (or about 4.40% of the population) who are Muslim. There are 5 individuals (or about 0.16% of the population) who belong to another church (not listed on the census), 227 (or about 7.25% of the population) belong to no church, are agnostic or atheist, and 106 individuals (or about 3.38% of the population) did not answer the question.

== Weather ==
Eschlikon has an average of 140.8 days of rain or snow per year and on average receives 1,268 mm (49.9 in) of precipitation. The wettest month is June during which time Eschlikon receives an average of 135 mm (5.3 in) of rain or snow. During this month there is precipitation for an average of 13.1 days. The month with the most days of precipitation is May, with an average of 13.5, but with only 127 mm (5.0 in) of rain or snow. The driest month of the year is October with an average of 82 mm (3.2 in) of precipitation over 13.1 days.

== Education ==
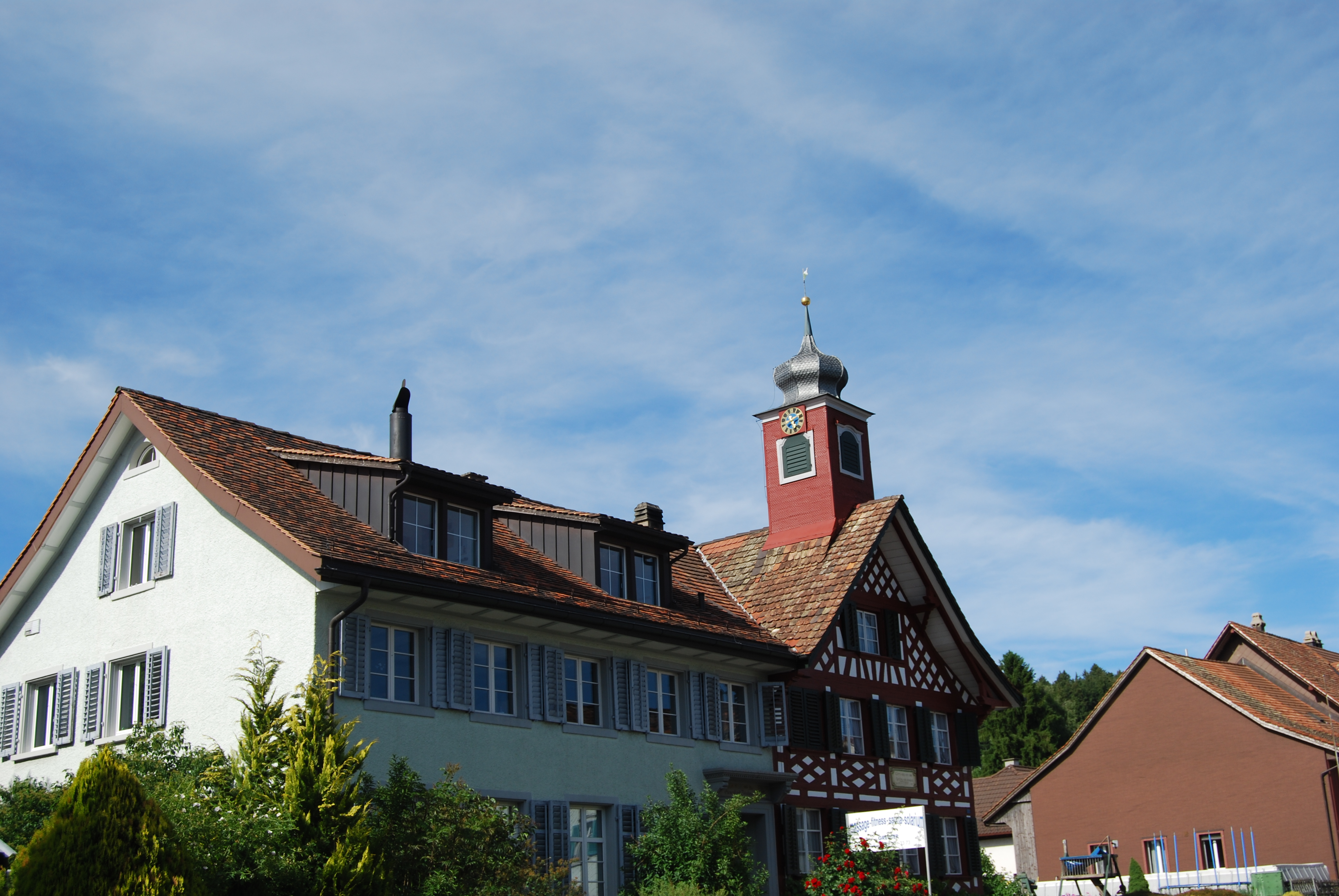
Old school building

The entire Swiss population is generally well educated. In Eschlikon about 75.9% of the population (between age 25 and 64) have completed either non-mandatory upper secondary education or additional higher education (either university or a Fachhochschule).
