= Rickenbach, Thurgau =

Rickenbach
- Municipality
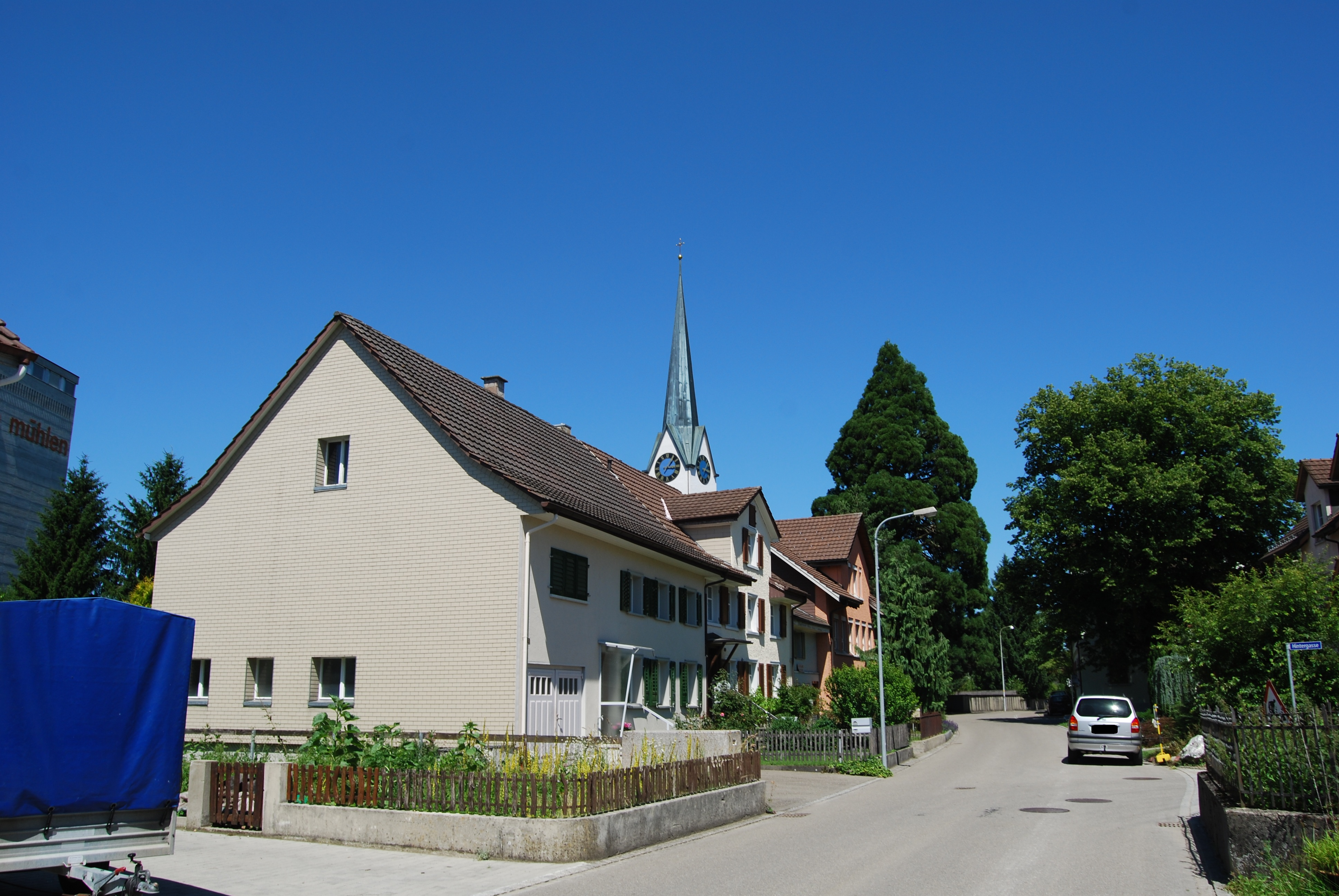

- Coat of arms
- Location of Rickenbach
- Location within Switzerland Location within Canton of Thurgau
- Coordinates: 47°27′N 9°3′E
- Country: Switzerland
- Canton: Thurgau
- District: Münchwilen

Area
  - Total: 1.56 km^{2} (0.60 sq mi)
- Elevation: 550 m (1,800 ft)

Population (December 2007)
  - Total: 2,451
  - Density: 1,570/km^{2} (4,070/sq mi)
- Time zone: UTC+01:00 (CET)
  - Summer (DST): UTC+02:00 (CEST)
- Postal code: 9532
- SFOS number: 4751
- ISO 3166 code: CH-TG
- Surrounded by: Jonschwil (SG), Kirchberg (SG), Wil (SG), Wilen
- Website: rickenbach-tg.ch

Rickenbach (Swiss Standard German pronunciation: [ˈrɪkn̩bax]) is a municipality in the district of Münchwilen in the canton of Thurgau in Switzerland.

== History ==
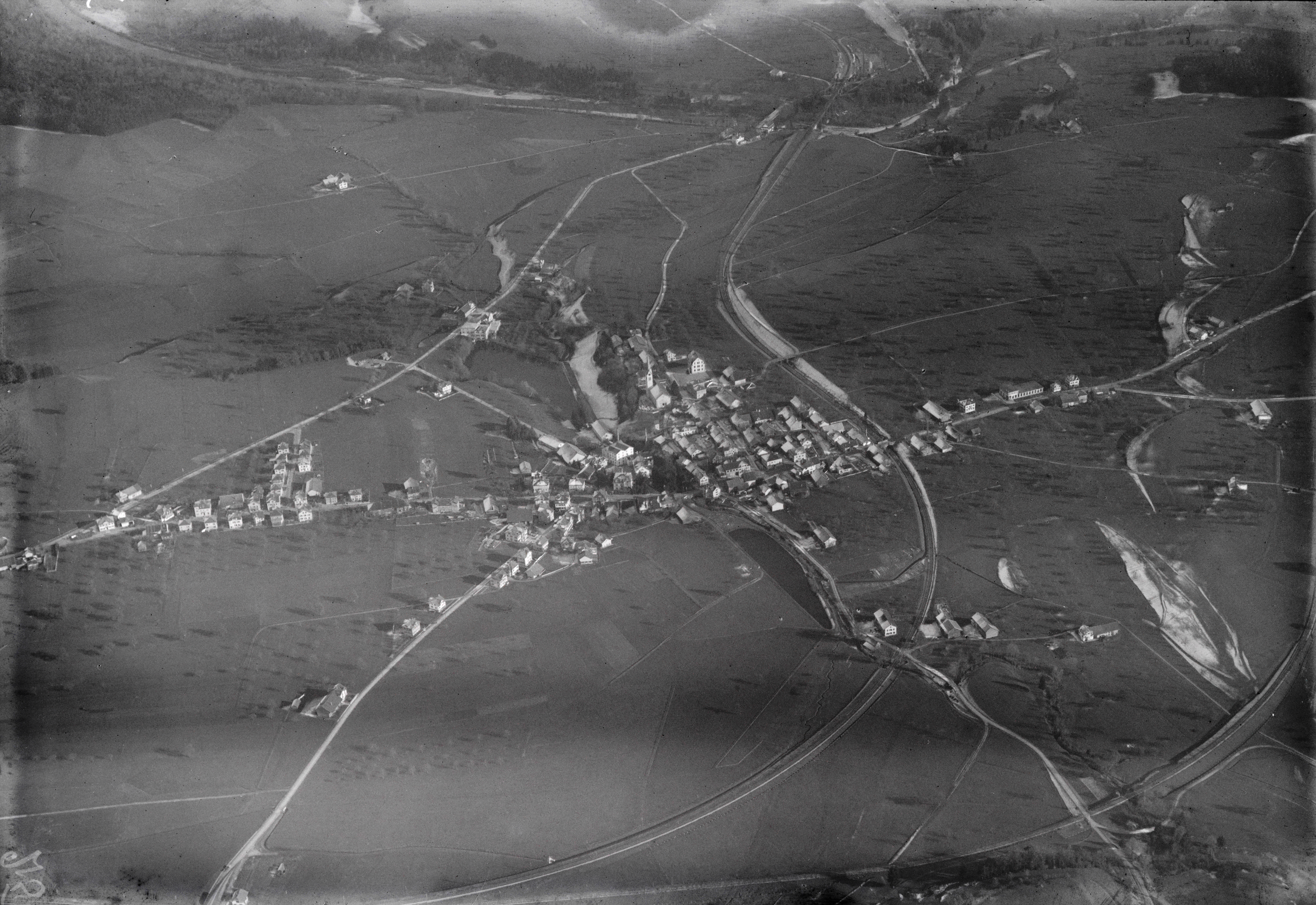
Aerial view from 600 m by Walter Mittelholzer (1923)

Rickenbach is first mentioned in 754 as Richinbach. The Abbey of St. Gall acquired land in Rickenbach during the 8th century. Then, in 1471, the Abbey acquired the pledged bailiwick of Rickenbach from Balthasar von Hohenlandenberg. Between 1483 and 1798, the village was the center of the court of Rickenbach, which also included Wilen, and after 1506, Busswil. The court was administered from Wilen. and was managed by the Office Wiler. The village church was built in 838. It was administered by the Abbey of St. Gall. Though, between 1350 and 1422 it was a filial church of the church of Kirchberg. From 1529 until 1531, the parish switched temporarily to the Reformed faith. The present church of St. Verena, was established in 1644.

After the end of the three-field system in the 19th century, livestock and dairy farming became the major sources of income. A mill was built in the 13th century and operated until 1919 when it was expanded to become Eberle mills. The expanded mill operated until 2000. The Eschmann Bell Foundry existed until 1973. After the construction of the A1 motorway and the growth of Wil between 1960 and 1990, the population doubled in Rickenbach.

== Geography ==
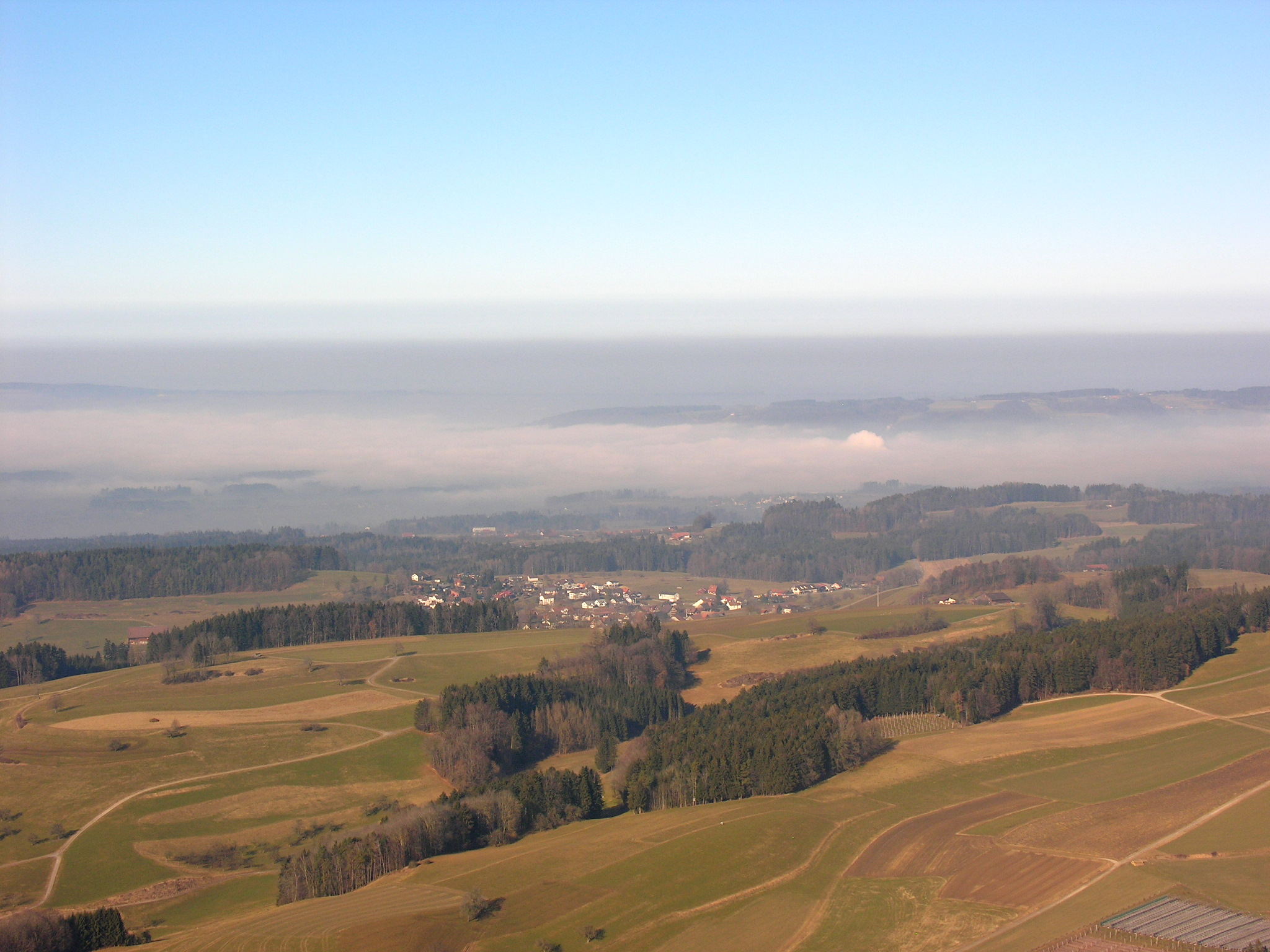
Aerial view of Rickenbach

Rickenbach has an area, as of 2009, of 1.56 square kilometers (0.60 sq mi). Of this area, 0.75 km^{2} (0.29 sq mi) or 48.1% is used for agricultural purposes, while 0.18 km^{2} (0.069 sq mi) or 11.5% is forested. Of the rest of the land, 0.6 km^{2} (0.23 sq mi) or 38.5% is settled (buildings or roads), 0.03 km^{2} (7.4 acres) or 1.9% is either rivers or lakes.

Of the built up area, industrial buildings made up 22.4% of the total area while housing and buildings made up 4.5% and transportation infrastructure made up 0.6%. Power and water infrastructure as well as other special developed areas made up 1.3% of the area while parks, green belts and sports fields made up 9.6%. Out of the forested land, all of the forested land area is covered with heavy forests. Of the agricultural land, 46.2% is used for growing crops, while 1.9% is used for orchards or vine crops. Of the water in the municipality, 1.3% is in lakes and 0.6% is in rivers and streams.

The municipality is located in the Münchwilen district, south of Wil.

== Demographics ==
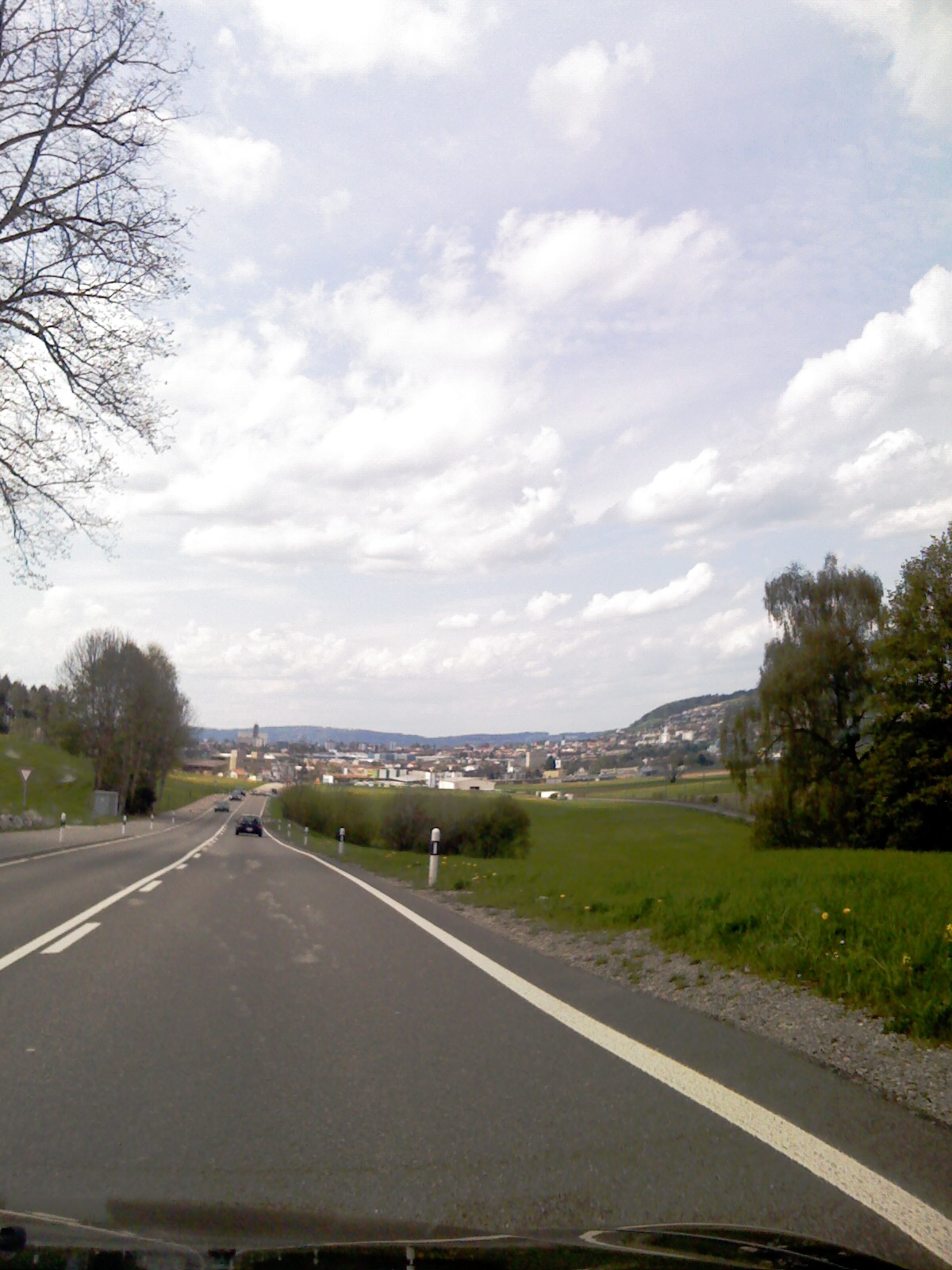
Rickenbach

Rickenbach has a population (as of December 2020) of 2,826. As of 2008, 31.4% of the population are foreign nationals. Over the last 10 years (1997–2007) the population has changed at a rate of %. Most of the population (as of 2000) speaks German (80.3%), with Albanian being second most common ( 6.2%) and Italian being third ( 5.7%).

As of 2008, the gender distribution of the population was 51.5% male and 48.5% female. The population was made up of 834 Swiss men (33.3% of the population), and 456 (18.2%) non-Swiss men. There were 882 Swiss women (35.2%), and 331 (13.2%) non-Swiss women.

In 2008, there were 18 live births to Swiss citizens and 9 births to non-Swiss citizens, and in same time span there were 17 deaths of Swiss citizens and 1 non-Swiss citizen death. Ignoring immigration and emigration, the population of Swiss citizens increased by 1 while the foreign population increased by 8. There were 6 Swiss men who emigrated from Switzerland to another country, 1 Swiss woman who emigrated from Switzerland to another country, 9 non-Swiss men who emigrated from Switzerland to another country and 6 non-Swiss women who emigrated from Switzerland to another country. The total Swiss population change in 2008 (from all sources) was an increase of 21 and the non-Swiss population change was an increase of 20 people. This represents a population growth rate of 1.7%.

The age distribution, as of 2009, in Rickenbach is; 237 children or 9.4% of the population are between 0 and 9 years old and 269 teenagers or 10.7% are between 10 and 19. Of the adult population, 402 people or 16.0% of the population are between 20 and 29 years old. 371 people or 14.8% are between 30 and 39, 412 people or 16.4% are between 40 and 49, and 336 people or 13.4% are between 50 and 59. The senior population distribution is 250 people or 10.0% of the population are between 60 and 69 years old, 158 people or 6.3% are between 70 and 79, there are 68 people or 2.7% who are between 80 and 89, and there are 7 people or 0.3% who are 90 and older.

As of 2000, there were 1,032 private households in the municipality, and an average of 2.3 peoples per household. In 2000 there were 134 single family homes (or 55.6% of the total) out of a total of 241 inhabited buildings. There were 20 two family buildings (8.3%), 11 three family buildings (4.6%) and 76 multi-family buildings (or 31.5%). There were 579 (or 23.9%) persons who were part of a couple without children, and 1,322 (or 54.5%) who were part of a couple with children. There were 124 (or 5.1%) people who lived in single parent home, while there are 6 persons who were adult children living with one or both parents, 2 persons who lived in a household made up of relatives, 26 who lived in a household made up of unrelated persons, and 23 who are either institutionalized or live in another type of collective housing.

The vacancy rate for the municipality, in 2008, was 1.14%. As of 2007, the construction rate of new housing units was 16.7 new units per 1000 residents. In 2000 there were 1,155 apartments in the municipality. The most common apartment size was the 4 room apartment of which there were 388. There were 48 single room apartments and 105 apartments with six or more rooms.

In the 2007 federal election the most popular party was the SVP which received 47.19% of the vote. The next three most popular parties were the CVP (17.63%), the FDP (13.01%) and the SP (8.61%). In the federal election, a total of 560 votes were cast, and the voter turnout was 39.0%.

The historical population is given in the following table:

| year | population |
|---|---|
| 1850 | 464 |
| 1900 | 542 |
| 1950 | 845 |
| 1990 | 2,490 |
| 2000 | 2,426 |

== Economy ==
As of 2007, Rickenbach had an unemployment rate of 2.45%. As of 2005, there were 13 people employed in the primary economic sector and about 6 businesses involved in this sector. 188 people are employed in the secondary sector and there are 33 businesses in this sector. 596 people are employed in the tertiary sector, with 75 businesses in this sector.

In 2000, there were 1,733 workers who lived in the municipality. Of these, 1,045 or about 60.3% of the residents worked outside Rickenbach while 615 people commuted into the municipality for work. There were a total of 1,303 jobs (of at least 6 hours per week) in the municipality. Of the working population, 11.8% used public transportation to get to work, and 54.1% used a private car.

== Religion ==
From the 2000 census, 1,238 or 51.0% were Roman Catholic, while 539 or 22.2% belonged to the Swiss Reformed Church. Of the rest of the population, there were 2 Old Catholics (or about 0.08% of the population) who belonged to the Christian Catholic Church of Switzerland there are 75 individuals (or about 3.09% of the population) who belong to the Orthodox Church, and there are 81 individuals (or about 3.34% of the population) who belong to another Christian church. There were 272 (or about 11.21% of the population) who are Islamic. There are 13 individuals (or about 0.54% of the population) who belong to another church (not listed on the census), 98 (or about 4.04% of the population) belong to no church, are agnostic or atheist, and 108 individuals (or about 4.45% of the population) did not answer the question.

== Education ==
About 62.4% of the population (between age 25–64) have completed either non-mandatory upper secondary education or additional higher education (either university or a Fachhochschule).

Rickenbach is home to the Rickenbach primary school district. It is also home to the Rickenbach secondary school district.

In the 2008–09 school year, there were 207 students in the primary school district. There were 45 children in the kindergarten, and the average class size was 15 kindergartners. Of the children in kindergarten, 26 or 57.8% were female, 23 or 51.1% were not Swiss citizens and 21 or 46.7% did not speak German natively. The lower and upper primary levels begin at about age 5-6 and last for 6 years. There were 75 children in who were at the lower primary level and 87 children in the upper primary level. The average class size in the primary school was 21.43 students. At the lower primary level, there were 31 children or 41.3% of the total population who were female, 40 or 53.3% were not Swiss citizens and 37 or 49.3% did not speak German natively. In the upper primary level, there were 40 or 46.0% who were female, 44 or 50.6% were not Swiss citizens and 48 or 55.2% did not speak German natively.

In the secondary school district there are 197 students. At the secondary level, students are divided according to performance. The secondary level begins at about age 12 and usually lasts 3 years. There were 104 teenagers who were in the advanced school, of which 53 or 51.0% were female, 13 or 12.5% were not Swiss citizens and 13 or 12.5% did not speak German natively. There were 79 teenagers who were in the standard school, of which 34 or 43.0% were female, 21 or 26.6% were not Swiss citizens and 18 or 22.8% did not speak German natively. Finally, there were 14 teenagers who were in special or remedial classes, of which 5 or 35.7% were female, 9 or 64.3% were not Swiss citizens and 10 or 71.4% did not speak German natively. The average class size for all classes at the secondary level was 18.3 students.
