= Münchwilen, Thurgau =

Münchwilen
- Municipality
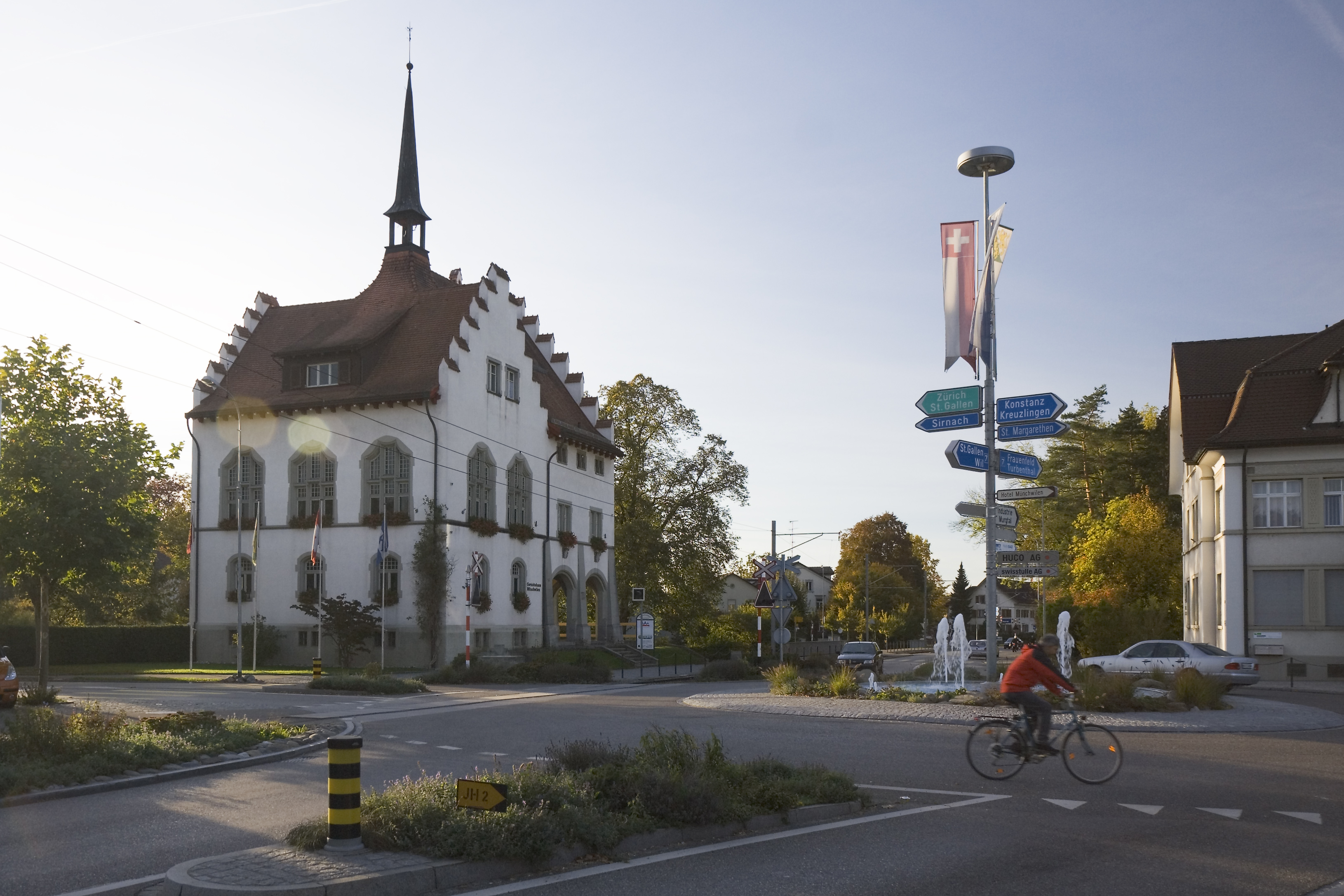
- Münchwilen village

- Coat of arms
- Location of Münchwilen
- Location within Switzerland Location within Canton of Thurgau
- Coordinates: 47°28′N 8°59′E
- Country: Switzerland
- Canton: Thurgau
- District: Münchwilen

Area
  - Total: 7.79 km^{2} (3.01 sq mi)
- Elevation: 515 m (1,690 ft)

Population (December 2007)
  - Total: 4,618
  - Density: 593/km^{2} (1,540/sq mi)
- Time zone: UTC+01:00 (CET)
  - Summer (DST): UTC+02:00 (CEST)
- Postal code: 9542
- SFOS number: 4746
- ISO 3166 code: CH-TG
- Localities: Münchwilen, St. Margarethen
- Surrounded by: Bettwiesen, Bronschhofen (SG), Eschlikon, Sirnach, Wängi, Wil (SG)
- Twin towns: Leuk (Switzerland)
- Website: muenchwilen-tg.ch

Münchwilen is a municipality and district capital of the district of Münchwilen in the canton of Thurgau in Switzerland. It includes the settlements of Mezikon, Oberhofen and St. Margarethen.

== History ==
Münchwilen is first mentioned in 1160 as Munchiwillar. Oberhofen bei Münchwilen is first mentioned in 1160-70 as Obirhovin. Sankt Margarethen is first mentioned in 1275 as Affoltrangen sancte Margarete. Hofen-Holzmannshaus is first mentioned in 1244 as Hovin and in 1448 as Holtzmans guot bei Eschlikon. Between 1803 and 1950 Münchwilen was an Ortsgemeinde in the municipality of Sirnach. In a process that lasted from 1812 until 1824, Münchwilen absorbed the municipality of Mezikon. Then, in 1950, the Ortsgemeinden of Münchwilen, Oberhofen and St. Margarethen, against opposition from the rest of the villages in Sirnach, merged to form the independent municipality of Münchwilen.

=== Münchwilen ===
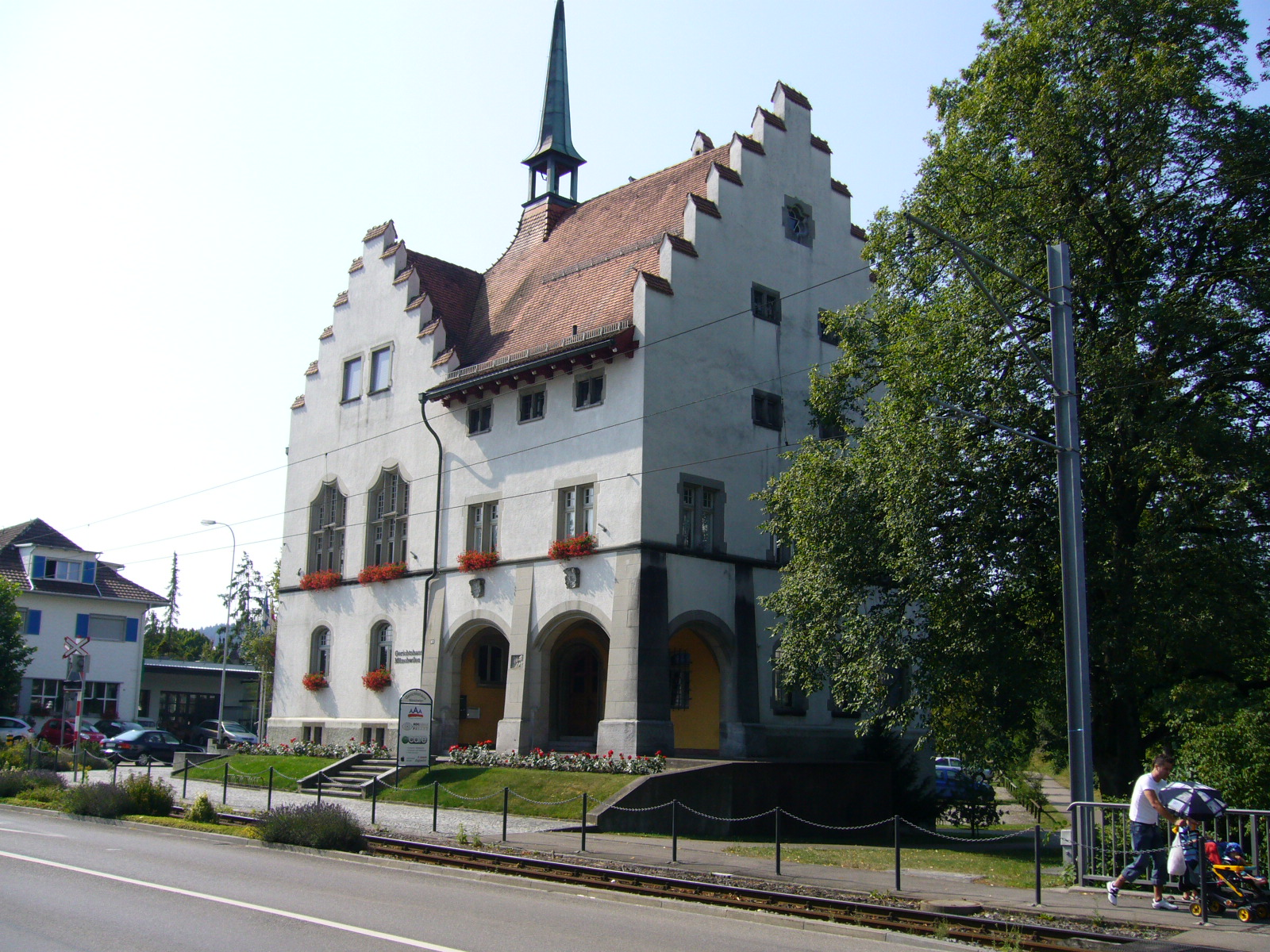
Courthouse in Münchwilen

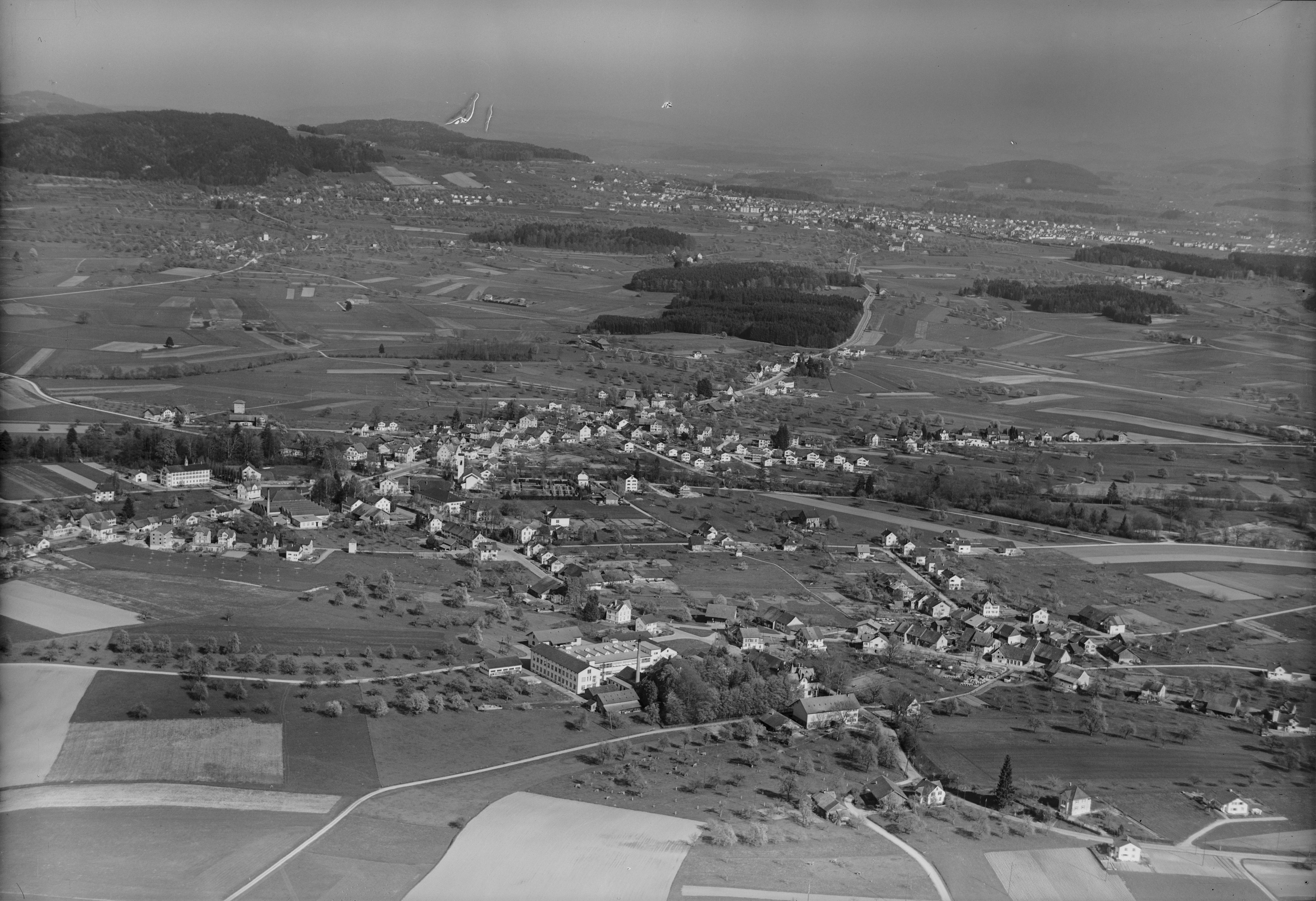
Aerial view (1953)

Münchwilen was first mentioned in 1160 and 1170 as part of the estates of the Abbey of St. Gallen. From the late 15th century until 1798 it belonged to the so-called High Court of Tuttwilerberg, in which the Swiss Confederation governor or his deputy held both the high and the low justice rights.

Until the founding of the Reformed parish of Münchwilen-Eschlikon in 1935 (which included Oberhofen, St. Margaret and Wallenwil), it was part of the parish of Sirnach. The Sirnach parish converted during the Protestant Reformation and then became a shared church. In 1937 a Reformed church was built in Münchwilen, followed in 1968 by the Catholic St. Anthony's Church.

The water power of the Murg river (a grist mill was built in 1601), the Murgbrücke (bridge over the Murg) to Oberhofen (built in 1774) and the expansion of Wil-Winterthur road (in 1785) provided the basis for the development of the tourism and manufacturing industry. A cotton mill was founded in 1817, which grew into the Heitz cotton weaving factory (with offices in St. Margaret), and the Zellweger spinning mill. In 1866, the Wäffler-Egli company operated 5,228 spindles and the J. Heitz & Cie. company employed around a thousand home workers. In 1871 the regional industrial center replaced Tobel as the district capital. The opening of the Frauenfeld-Wil train in 1887 led to strong growth in the village. In 1858, Sutter (a manufacturer of cleaning products) founded a vinegar factory in Münchwilen, which later became Johnson Diversey. Other major companies in Münchwilen included Swisstulle AG (founded in 1913, and until 2002 known as Schweiz. Gesellschaft für Tüllindustrie) and the light fixtures and metal goods factory Huco AG (founded 1927).

=== Oberhofen bei Münchwilen ===
From the Late Middle Ages until 1798 Oberhofen was part of the Tannegg Amt and the County of Thurgau. It was part of the parish of Sirnach until 1935 when it joined the Münchwilen-Eschlikon parish. The majority of the population are members of the Swiss Reformed Church (97% in 1850 and 73% in 1941). It is a typical industrial village on the eastern slope of the Tuttwil mountain and is connected by a ford and the Murgbrücke (built in 1774) with Münchwilen. The largest factory in the village is the former Sutter shoe polish factory, which after the death of Alfred Sutter went to Unilever and in 2002 was acquired by Johnson Diversey Schweiz. In 2009 the factory provided about 370 jobs in the village.

=== Sankt Margarethen ===
Sankt Margarethen was part of the Herrschaft of Lommis, which belonged to Fischingen Abbey between 1599 and 1798. The parish church was first mentioned in 1275 and in 1316 came under the authority of the abbey. In 1362, the village was transferred to the parish of Sirnach. During the Counter-Reformation the former parish church was demolished in 1641 and rebuilt nearby. During the 17th and 18th centuries the St. Margaretha chapel flourished as a pilgrimage church. The Reformed residents of the village joined the newly founded Münchwilen-Eschlikon parish in 1935. A mill existed in the village between 1474 and 1860, along with another mill in Mörikon from 1475 to 1918. Despite holding a market right since about 1711, markets were only irregularly held. In the 18th and 19th centuries spinning, weaving and embroidery provided much of the local income. Swisstulle AG (founded in 1913, and until 2002 known as Schweiz. Gesellschaft für Tüllindustrie) and the light fixtures and metal goods factory Huco AG (founded 1927) dominate the industrial character of the village.

== Geography ==
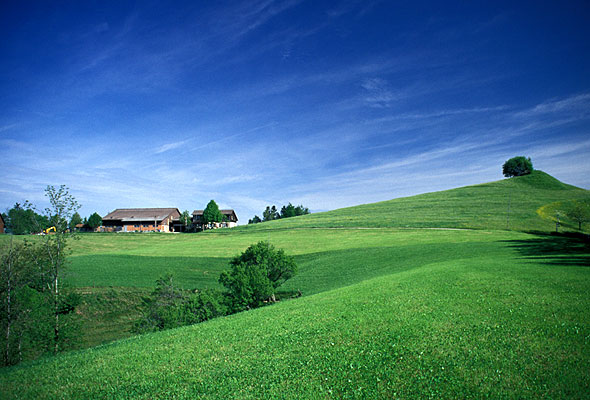
Farm house near Münchwilen

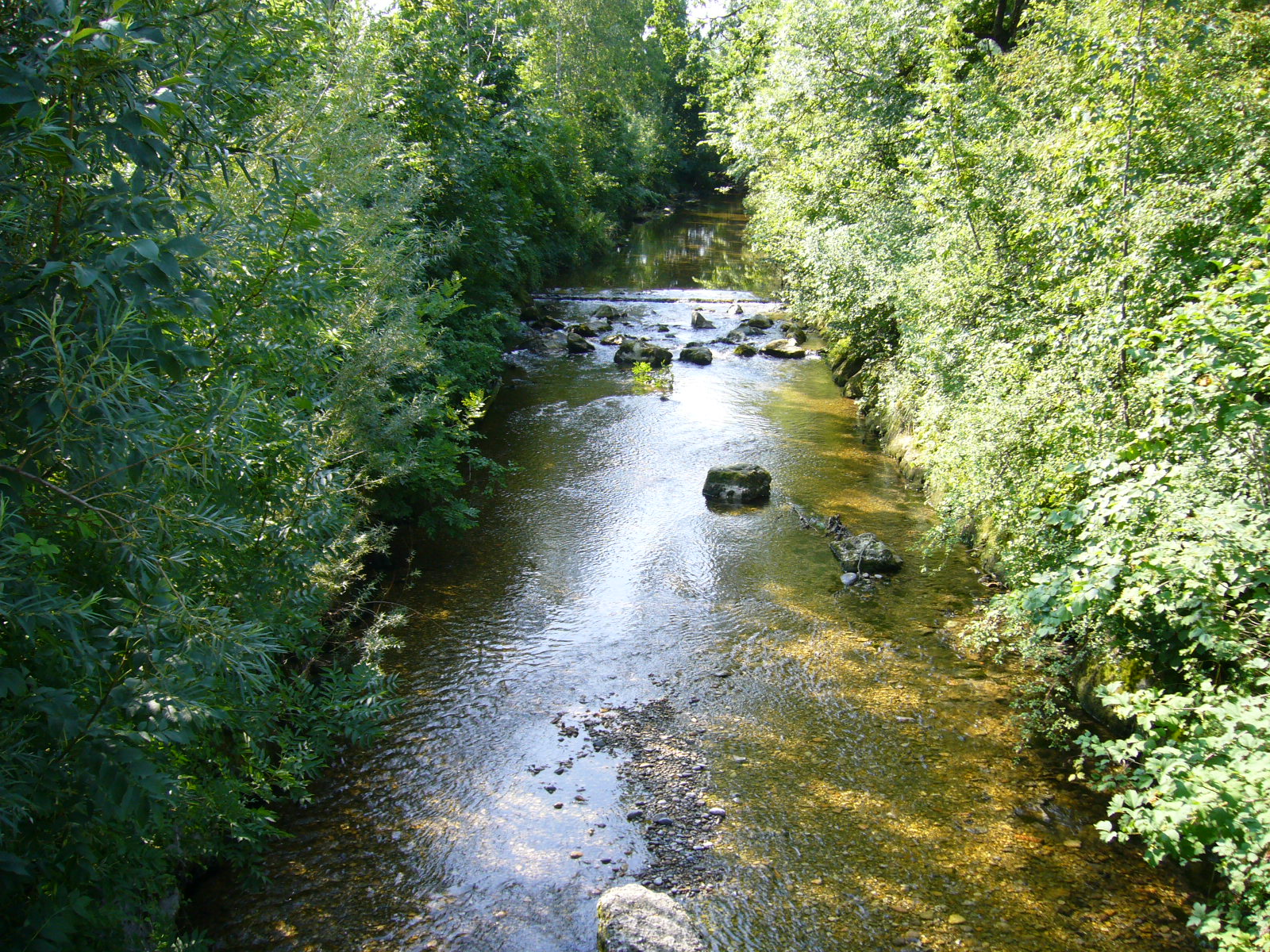
Murg river

Münchwilen has an area, as of 2009, of 7.79 square kilometers (3.01 sq mi). Of this area, 5.19 km^{2} (2.00 sq mi) or 66.6% is used for agricultural purposes, while 0.78 km^{2} (0.30 sq mi) or 10.0% is forested. Of the rest of the land, 1.8 km^{2} (0.69 sq mi) or 23.1% is settled (buildings or roads), 0.01 km^{2} (2.5 acres) or 0.1% is either rivers or lakes and 0.01 km^{2} (2.5 acres) or 0.1% is unproductive land.

Of the built up area, industrial buildings made up 11.9% of the total area, housing and other buildings made up 2.6% and transportation infrastructure made up 0.4%. Power and water infrastructure as well as other special developed areas made up 1.2% of the area while parks, green belts and sports fields made up 7.1%. Out of the forested land, 8.0% of the total land area is heavily forested and 2.1% is covered with orchards or small clusters of trees. Of the agricultural land, 61.9% is used for growing crops, while 4.7% is used for orchards or vine crops. All the water in the municipality is in lakes.

The municipality is the capital of the Münchwilen district. It is located north-west of Wil in the Murg valley. It consists of the villages of Münchwilen, Oberhofen bei Münchwilen and Sankt Margarethen and the hamlets of Freudenberg, Holzmannshaus (Hofen-Holzmannshaus), Mezikon, Mörikon, Pfannenstil and Sedel.

== Demographics ==
Münchwilen has a population (as of December 2020) of 5,830. As of 2008, 17.7% of the population are foreign nationals. Over the 10-year period from 1997 to 2007, the population changed at a rate of 6.7%. Most of the population (as of 2000) speaks German (86.8%), with Italian being the second most common ( 4.3%) and Turkish the third most common ( 2.1%) language.

As of 2008, the gender distribution of the population was 49.9% male and 50.1% female. The population was made up of 1,882 Swiss men (40.2% of the population), and 452 (9.7%) non-Swiss men. There were 1,969 Swiss women (42.1%), and 379 (8.1%) non-Swiss women.

In 2008 there were 41 live births to Swiss citizens and 12 births to non-Swiss citizens, and in same time span there were 28 deaths of Swiss citizens and 2 non-Swiss citizen deaths. Ignoring immigration and emigration, the population of Swiss citizens increased by 13 while the foreign population increased by 10. There was 1 Swiss man, 7 Swiss women who emigrated from Switzerland to another country, 13 non-Swiss men who emigrated from Switzerland to another country and 7 non-Swiss women who emigrated from Switzerland to another country. The total Swiss population change in 2008 (from all sources) was an increase of 32 and the non-Swiss population change was an increase of 30 people. This represents a population growth rate of 1.3%.

The age distribution, as of 2009, in Münchwilen is; 553 children or 11.6% of the population are between 0 and 9 years old and 658 teenagers or 13.8% are between 10 and 19. Of the adult population, 622 people or 13.1% of the population are between 20 and 29 years old. 633 people or 13.3% are between 30 and 39, 815 people or 17.1% are between 40 and 49, and 613 people or 12.9% are between 50 and 59. The senior population distribution is 423 people or 8.9% of the population are between 60 and 69 years old, 263 people or 5.5% are between 70 and 79, there are 150 people or 3.2% who are between 80 and 89, and there are 30 people or 0.6% who are 90 and older.

As of 2000, there were 1,728 private households in the municipality, and an average of 2.5 persons per household. In 2000 there were 624 single family homes (or 77.9% of the total) out of a total of 801 inhabited buildings. There were 73 two family buildings (9.1%), 25 three family buildings (3.1%) and 79 multi-family buildings (or 9.9%). There were 915 (or 20.1%) persons who were part of a couple without children, and 2,662 (or 58.5%) who were part of a couple with children. There were 248 (or 5.4%) people who lived in single parent home, while there are 29 persons who were adult children living with one or both parents, 18 persons who lived in a household made up of relatives, 19 who lived in a household made up of unrelated persons, and 174 who are either institutionalized or live in another type of collective housing.

The vacancy rate for the municipality, in 2008, was 1.1%. As of 2007, the construction rate of new housing units was 0.9 new units per 1000 residents. In 2000 there were 1,866 apartments in the municipality. The most common apartment size was the 4 room apartment of which there were 593. There were 51 single room apartments and 272 apartments with six or more rooms.

In the 2007 federal election the most popular party was the SVP which received 44.82% of the vote. The next three most popular parties were the CVP (17.82%), the Green Party (11.56%) and the FDP (10.79%). In the federal election, a total of 1,219 votes were cast, and the voter turnout was 41.5%.

The historical population is given in the following table:

Year	Population Münchwilen	Population Oberhofen bei Münchwilen	Population Sankt Margarethen
1850	400	318	245
1900	585	486	–
1910	–	677	–
1941	1,046	641	513
Year	Population, Münchwilen		
1950	2,540		
1990	3,597		
2000	4,553		

== Heritage sites of national significance ==
The St. Margarethen Chapel is listed as a Swiss heritage site of national significance.

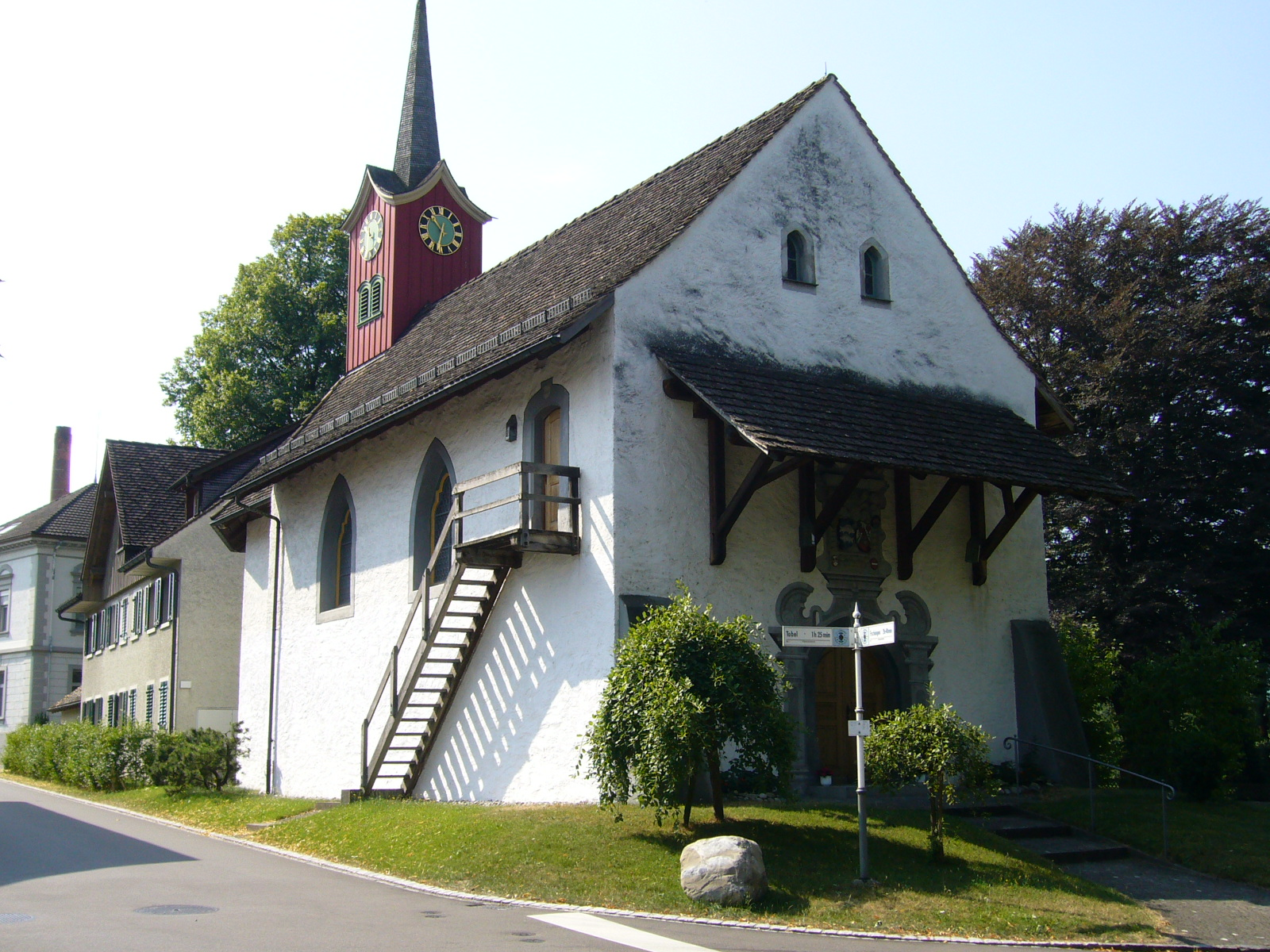
St. Margareten Chapel

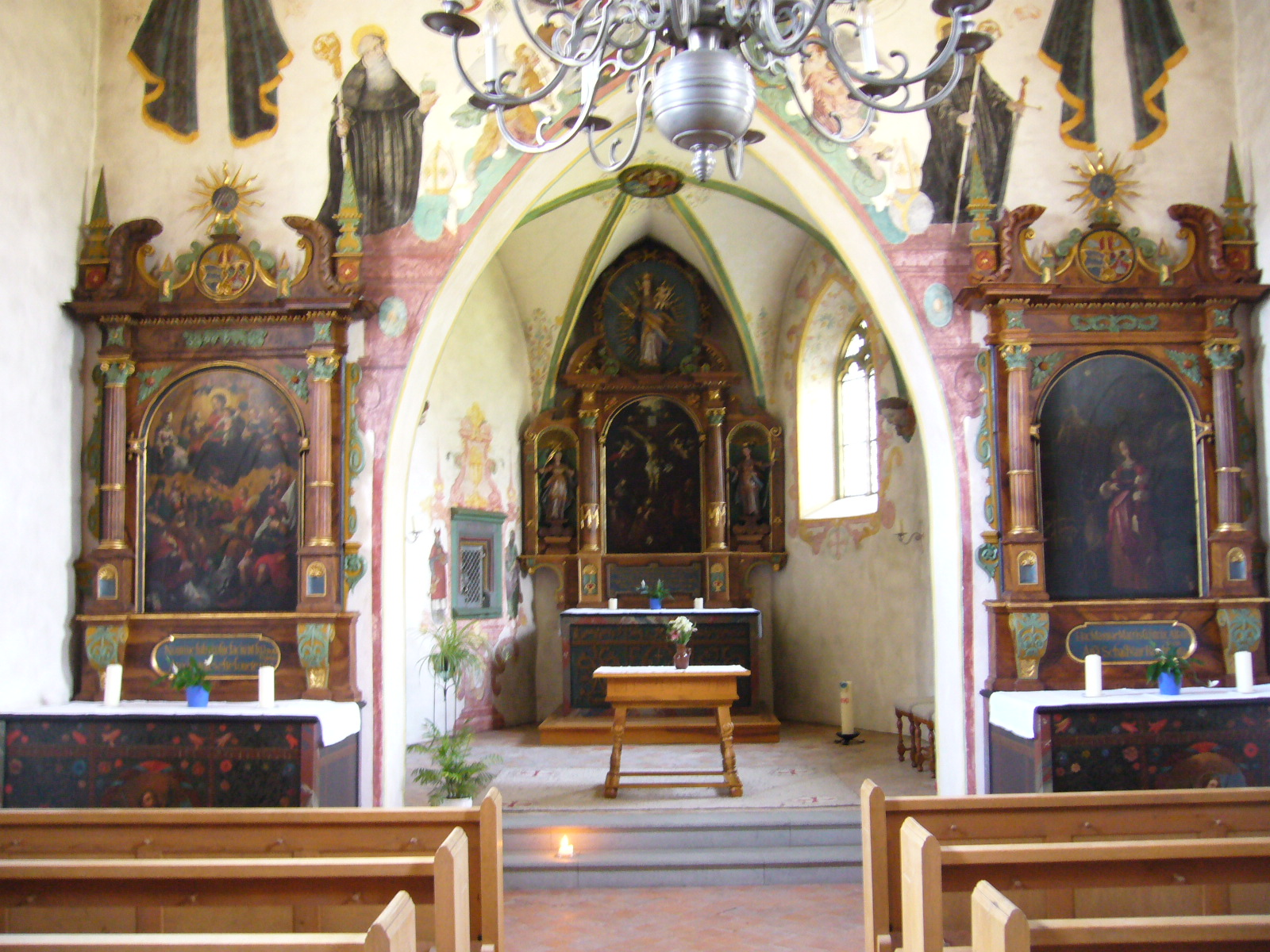
Interior of the Chapel

== Economy ==
As of 2007, Münchwilen had an unemployment rate of 1.88%. As of 2005, there were 92 people employed in the primary economic sector and about 30 businesses involved in this sector. 1,090 people are employed in the secondary sector and there are 67 businesses in this sector. 876 people are employed in the tertiary sector, with 141 businesses in this sector. In 2000 there were 3,134 workers who lived in the municipality. Of these, 1,479 or about 47.2% of the residents worked outside Münchwilen while 1,243 people commuted into the municipality for work. There were a total of 2,898 jobs (of at least 6 hours per week) in the municipality. Of the working population, 11.1% used public transportation to get to work, and 51.1% used a private car.

== Religion ==
From the 2000 census, 1,941 or 42.6% were Roman Catholic, while 1,627 or 35.7% belonged to the Swiss Reformed Church. Of the rest of the population, there was 1 Old Catholic who belonged to the Christian Catholic Church of Switzerland there are 140 individuals (or about 3.07% of the population) who belong to the Orthodox Church, and there are 126 individuals (or about 2.77% of the population) who belong to another Christian church. There were 2 individuals (or about 0.04% of the population) who were Jewish, and 273 (or about 6.00% of the population) who are Islamic. There are 93 individuals (or about 2.04% of the population) who belong to another church (not listed on the census), 215 (or about 4.72% of the population) belong to no church, are agnostic or atheist, and 135 individuals (or about 2.97% of the population) did not answer the question.

== Education ==
In Münchwilen about 68.4% of the population (between age 25–64) have completed either non-mandatory upper secondary education or additional higher education (either university or a Fachhochschule).

Münchwilen is home to the Münchwilen primary and secondary school district. In the 2008/2009 school year there were 537 students at either the primary or secondary levels. There were 118 children in the kindergarten, and the average class size was 19.67 kindergartners. Of the children in kindergarten, 48 or 40.7% were female, 22 or 18.6% were not Swiss citizens and 23 or 19.5% did not speak German natively. The lower and upper primary levels begin at about age 5-6 and last for 6 years. There were 152 children in who were at the lower primary level and 190 children in the upper primary level. The average class size in the primary school was 20.44 students. At the lower primary level, there were 65 children or 42.8% of the total population who were female, 18 or 11.8% were not Swiss citizens and 27 or 17.8% did not speak German natively. In the upper primary level, there were 92 or 48.4% who were female, 32 or 16.8% were not Swiss citizens and 34 or 17.9% did not speak German natively.

At the secondary level, students are divided according to performance. The secondary level begins at about age 12 and usually lasts 3 years. There were 126 teenagers who were in the advanced school, of which 71 or 56.3% were female, 11 or 8.7% were not Swiss citizens and 12 or 9.5% did not speak German natively. There were 61 teenagers who were in the standard school, of which 30 or 49.2% were female, 18 or 29.5% were not Swiss citizens and 18 or 29.5% did not speak German natively. Finally, there were 8 teenagers who were in special or remedial classes, of which 5 or 62.5% were female, 3 or 37.5% were not Swiss citizens and 3 or 37.5% did not speak German natively. The average class size for all classes at the secondary level was 20.78 students.

== Transportation ==
The municipality has two railway stations, Münchwilen and Münchwilen Pflegeheim. Both are located on the Frauenfeld–Wil line and served by the S15 of the St. Gallen S-Bahn.
