= Sirnach =

- Municipality
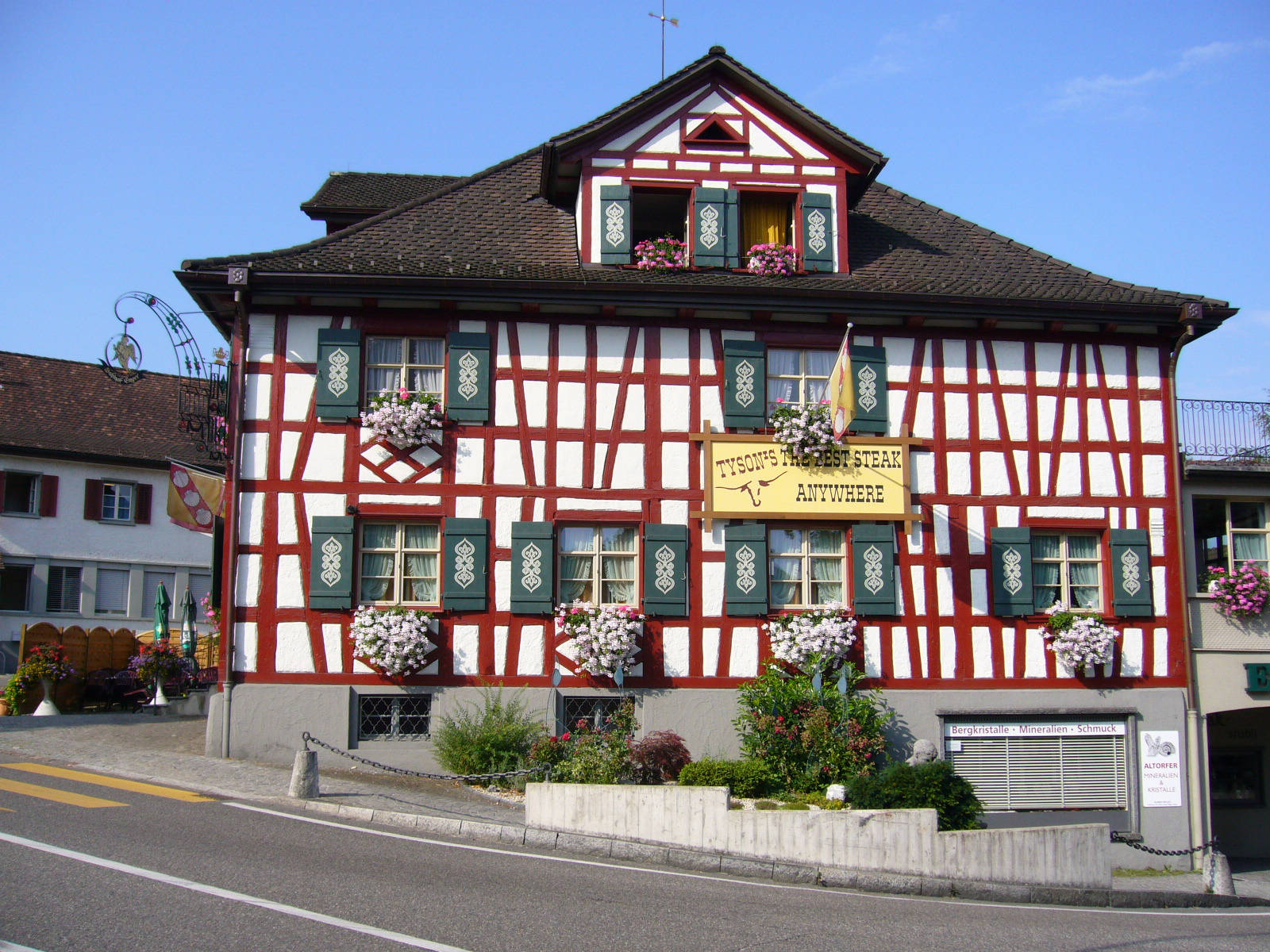
- Sirnach village

- Coat of arms
- Location of Sirnach
- Location within Switzerland Location within Canton of Thurgau
- Coordinates: 47°28′N 9°0′E
- Country: Switzerland
- Canton: Thurgau
- District: Münchwilen

Area
  - Total: 12.4 km^{2} (4.8 sq mi)
- Elevation: 545 m (1,788 ft)

Population (December 2007)
  - Total: 6,702
  - Density: 540/km^{2} (1,400/sq mi)
- Time zone: UTC+01:00 (CET)
  - Summer (DST): UTC+02:00 (CEST)
- Postal code: 8370
- SFOS number: 4761
- ISO 3166 code: CH-TG
- Surrounded by: Eschlikon, Fischingen, Kirchberg (SG), Münchwilen, Wil (SG), Wilen
- Twin towns: Helvécia (Hungary)
- Website: www.sirnach.ch

Sirnach is a municipality in the district of Münchwilen in the canton of Thurgau in Switzerland.

== Geography ==
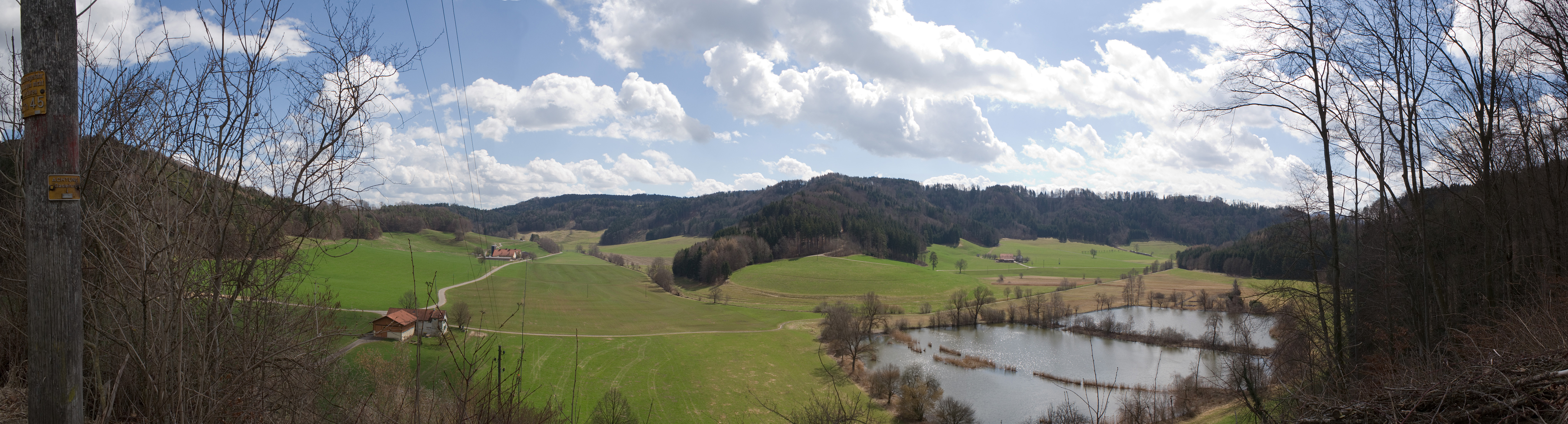
Moswangerriet near Sirnach

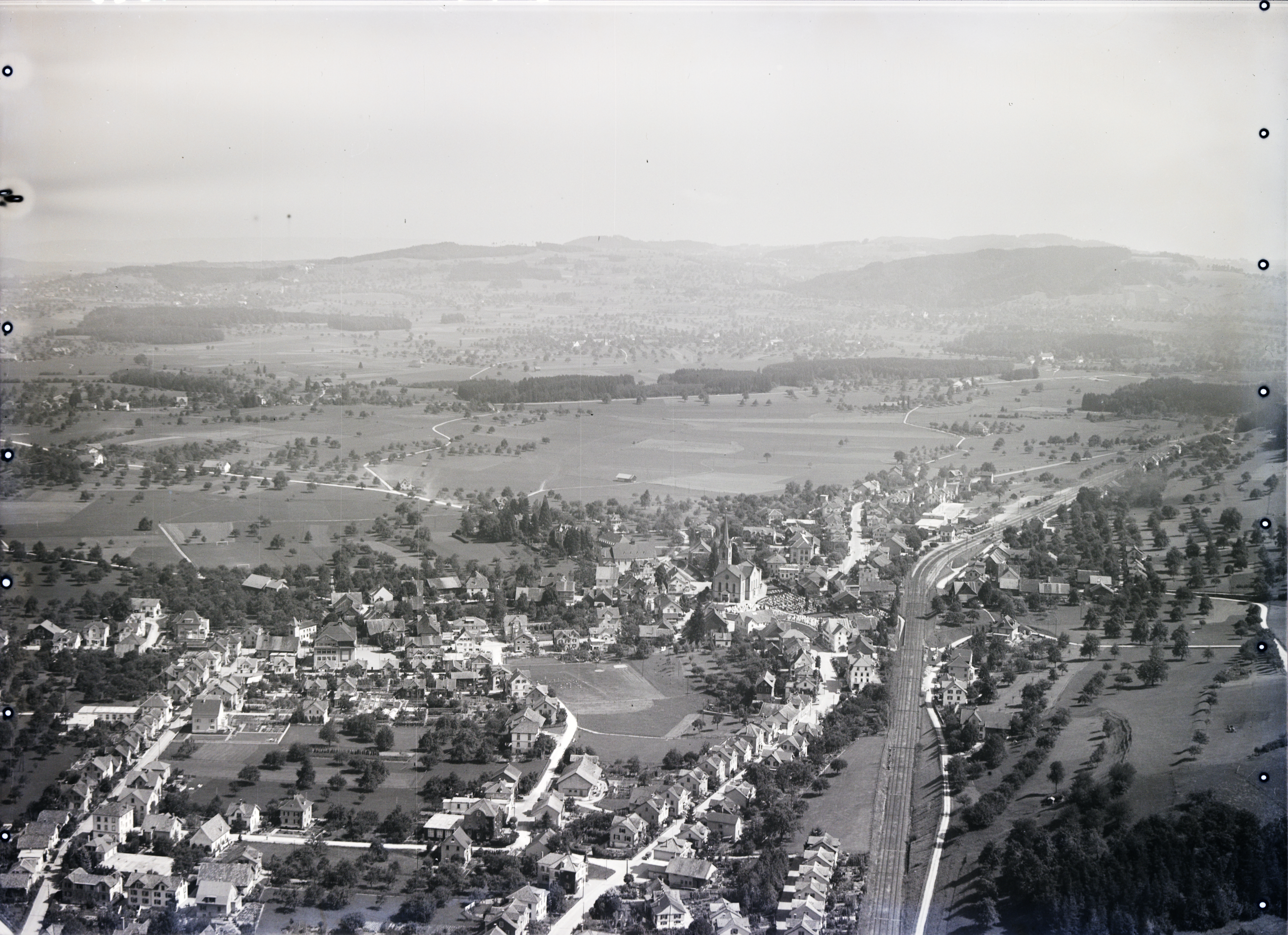
Aerial view from 400 m by Walter Mittelholzer (1934)

Sirnach has an area, as of 2009, of 12.41 square kilometers (4.79 sq mi). Of this area, 6.69 km^{2} (2.58 sq mi) or 53.9% is used for agricultural purposes, while 3.09 km^{2} (1.19 sq mi) or 24.9% is forested. Of the rest of the land, 2.37 km^{2} (0.92 sq mi) or 19.1% is settled (buildings or roads), 0.09 km^{2} (22 acres) or 0.7% is either rivers or lakes and 0.2 km^{2} (0.077 sq mi) or 1.6% is unproductive land.

Of the built up area, industrial buildings made up 9.4% of the total area while housing and buildings made up 0.8% and transportation infrastructure made up 0.5%. while parks, green belts and sports fields made up 7.5%. Out of the forested land, 22.8% of the total land area is heavily forested and 2.1% is covered with orchards or small clusters of trees. Of the agricultural land, 50.1% is used for growing crops, while 3.8% is used for orchards or vine crops. Of the water in the municipality, 0.6% is in lakes and 0.2% is in rivers and streams.

In 1997 Horben, Sirnach and Wiezikon merged with Sirnach.

== Demographics ==
Sirnach has a population (as of December 2020) of 7,901. As of 2008, 21.0% of the population are foreign nationals. Over the last 10 years (1997–2007) the population has changed at a rate of 8.3%. Most of the population (as of 2000) speaks German (85.5%), with Italian being second most common (4.7%) and Albanian being third (3.0%).

As of 2008, the gender distribution of the population was 50.1% male and 49.9% female. The population was made up of 2,643 Swiss men (38.7% of the population), and 778 (11.4%) non-Swiss men. There were 2,747 Swiss women (40.2%), and 659 (9.7%) non-Swiss women.

In 2008 there were 48 live births to Swiss citizens and 17 births to non-Swiss citizens, and in same time span there were 46 deaths of Swiss citizens and 5 non-Swiss citizen deaths. Ignoring immigration and emigration, the population of Swiss citizens increased by 2 while the foreign population increased by 12. There was 1 Swiss man, 3 Swiss women who emigrated from Switzerland to another country, 41 non-Swiss men who emigrated from Switzerland to another country and 24 non-Swiss women who emigrated from Switzerland to another country. The total Swiss population change in 2008 (from all sources) was an increase of 59 and the non-Swiss population change was an increase of 37 people. This represents a population growth rate of 1.4%.

The age distribution, as of 2009, in Sirnach is; 696 children or 10.0% of the population are between 0 and 9 years old and 956 teenagers or 13.8% are between 10 and 19. Of the adult population, 935 people or 13.5% of the population are between 20 and 29 years old. 876 people or 12.6% are between 30 and 39, 1,174 people or 16.9% are between 40 and 49, and 974 people or 14.1% are between 50 and 59. The senior population distribution is 664 people or 9.6% of the population are between 60 and 69 years old, 400 people or 5.8% are between 70 and 79, there are 205 people or 3.0% who are between 80 and 89, and there are 49 people or 0.7% who are 90 and older.

As of 2000, there were 2,475 private households in the municipality, and an average of 2.5 persons per household. In 2000 there were 816 single family homes (or 74.2% of the total) out of a total of 1,099 inhabited buildings. There were 109 two family buildings (9.9%), 36 three family buildings (3.3%) and 138 multi-family buildings (or 12.6%). There were 1,327 (or 20.9%) persons who were part of a couple without children, and 3,619 (or 56.9%) who were part of a couple with children. There were 308 (or 4.8%) people who lived in single parent home, while there are 32 persons who were adult children living with one or both parents, 24 persons who lived in a household made up of relatives, 46 who lived in a household made up of unrelated persons, and 243 who are either institutionalized or live in another type of collective housing.

The vacancy rate for the municipality, in 2008, was 1.8%. As of 2007, the construction rate of new housing units was 10.7 new units per 1000 residents. In 2000 there were 2,785 apartments in the municipality. The most common apartment size was the 4 room apartment of which there were 799. There were 109 single room apartments and 432 apartments with six or more rooms. As of 2000 the average price to rent an average apartment in Sirnach was 989.33 Swiss francs (CHF) per month (US$790, £450, €630 approx. exchange rate from 2000). The average rate for a one-room apartment was 477.90 CHF (US$380, £220, €310), a two-room apartment was about 713.65 CHF (US$570, £320, €460), a three-room apartment was about 872.81 CHF (US$700, £390, €560) and a six or more room apartment cost an average of 1588.87 CHF (US$1270, £710, €1020). The average apartment price in Sirnach was 88.6% of the national average of 1116 CHF.

In the 2007 federal election the most popular party was the SVP which received 43.26% of the vote. The next three most popular parties were the CVP (20.61%), the SP (9.92%) and the FDP (9.28%). In the federal election, a total of 1,860 votes were cast, and the voter turnout was 44.3%.

The historical population is given in the following table:

| year | population |
|---|---|
| 1950 | 4,133 |
| 1960 | 4,463 |
| 1980 | 5,502 |
| 1990 | 6,247 |
| 2000 | 6,359 |

== Economy ==
As of 2007, Sirnach had an unemployment rate of 1.81%. As of 2005, there were 110 people employed in the primary economic sector and about 42 businesses involved in this sector. 868 people are employed in the secondary sector and there are 97 businesses in this sector. 1,521 people are employed in the tertiary sector, with 211 businesses in this sector.

In 2000 there were 4,360 workers who lived in the municipality. Of these, 2,232 or about 51.2% of the residents worked outside Sirnach while 1,406 people commuted into the municipality for work. There were a total of 3,534 jobs (of at least 6 hours per week) in the municipality. Of the working population, 12.7% used public transportation to get to work, and 51.5% used a private car.

== Religion ==
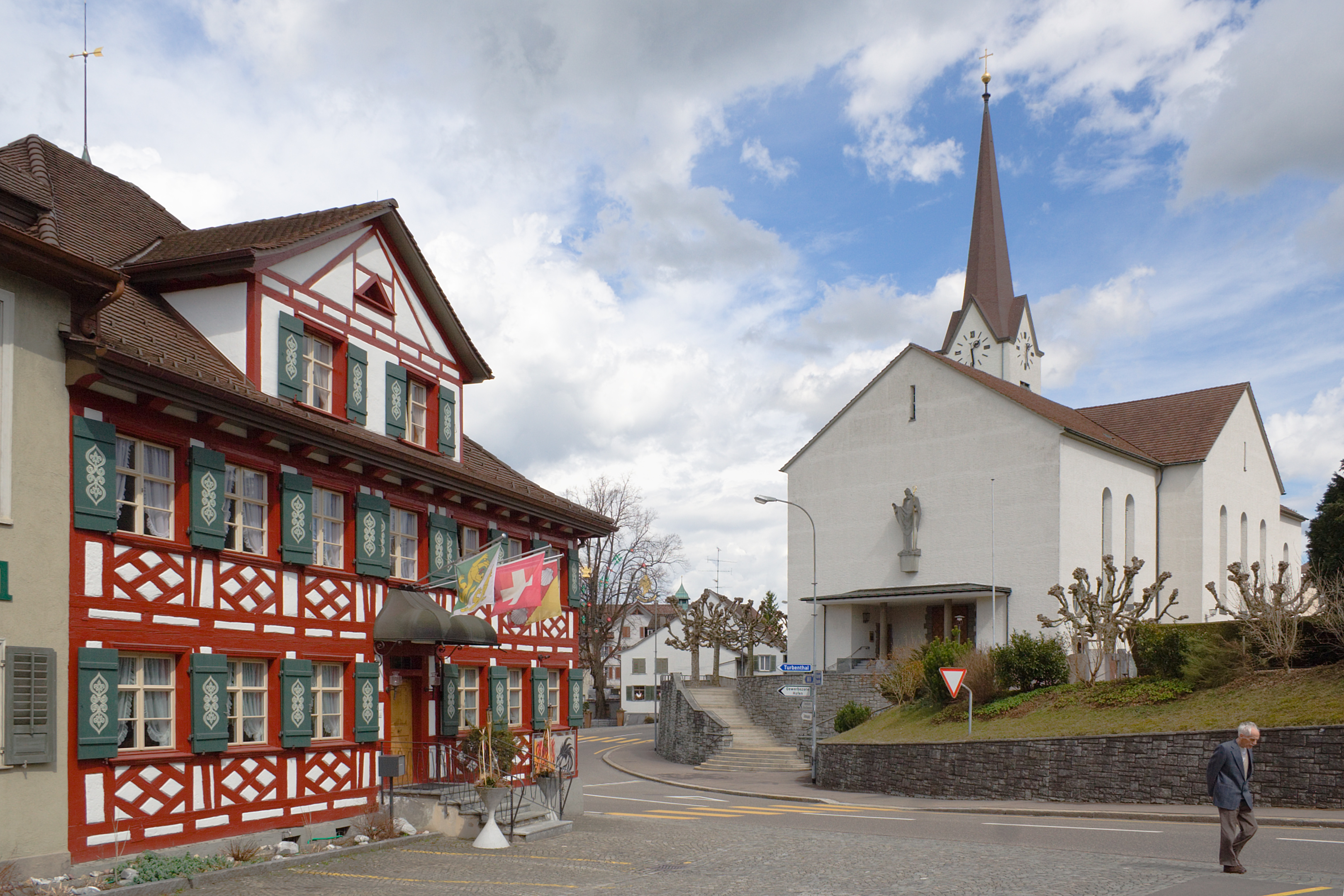
Catholic Church in Sirnach

From the 2000 census, 3,094 or 48.7% were Roman Catholic, while 1,794 or 28.2% belonged to the Swiss Reformed Church. Of the rest of the population, there were 3 Old Catholics (or about 0.05% of the population) who belonged to the Christian Catholic Church of Switzerland there are 159 individuals (or about 2.50% of the population) who belong to the Orthodox Church, and there are 240 individuals (or about 3.77% of the population) who belong to another Christian church. There were 3 individuals (or about 0.05% of the population) who were Jewish, and 519 (or about 8.16% of the population) who are muslim. There are 33 individuals (or about 0.52% of the population) who belong to another church (not listed on the census), 288 (or about 4.53% of the population) belong to no church, are agnostic or atheist, and 226 individuals (or about 3.55% of the population) did not answer the question.

== Education ==
In Sirnach about 66.1% of the population (between age 25-64) have completed either non-mandatory upper secondary education or additional higher education (either university or a Fachhochschule).

Sirnach is home to the Sirnach primary and secondary school district. In the 2008/2009 school year there were 713 students at either the primary or secondary levels. There were 144 children in the kindergarten, and the average class size was 18 kindergartners. Of the children in kindergarten, 70 or 48.6% were female, 39 or 27.1% were not Swiss citizens and 33 or 22.9% did not speak German natively. The lower and upper primary levels begin at about age 5-6 and last for 6 years. There were 205 children in who were at the lower primary level and 266 children in the upper primary level. The average class size in the primary school was 19.55 students. At the lower primary level, there were 91 children or 44.4% of the total population who were female, 58 or 28.3% were not Swiss citizens and 63 or 30.7% did not speak German natively. In the upper primary level, there were 131 or 49.2% who were female, 51 or 19.2% were not Swiss citizens and 61 or 22.9% did not speak German natively.

At the secondary level, students are divided according to performance. The secondary level begins at about age 12 and usually lasts 3 years. There were 117 teenagers who were in the advanced school, of which 67 or 57.3% were female, 15 or 12.8% were not Swiss citizens and 14 or 12.0% did not speak German natively. There were 99 teenagers who were in the standard school, of which 40 or 40.4% were female, 38 or 38.4% were not Swiss citizens and 36 or 36.4% did not speak German natively. Finally, there were 26 teenagers who were in special or remedial classes, of which 8 or 30.8% were female, 9 or 34.6% were not Swiss citizens and 12 or 46.2% did not speak German natively. The average class size for all classes at the secondary level was 18 students.
