= Münchwilen District =

Coordinates: 47.4833°N 8.98333°E

Münchwilen District Bezirk Münchwilen
- District
- Country: Switzerland
- Canton: Thurgau
- Capital: Münchwilen

Area
  - Total: 155.86 km^{2} (60.18 sq mi)

Population (2020)
  - Total: 48,285
  - Density: 309.80/km^{2} (802.37/sq mi)
- Time zone: UTC+1 (CET)
  - Summer (DST): UTC+2 (CEST)
- Municipalities: 13

Münchwilen District is one of the five districts of the canton of Thurgau, Switzerland. It has a population of 48,285 (as of 31 December 2020). Its capital is the town of Münchwilen.

The district contains the following municipalities:

Coat of arms	Municipality	Population (31 December 2020)	Area km^{2}
	Aadorf	9,216	20.0
	Bettwiesen	1,228	3.85
	Bichelsee-Balterswil	2,949	12.27
	Braunau	801	9.19
	Eschlikon	4,577	6.20
	Fischingen	2,836	30.67
	Lommis	1,243	8.63
	Münchwilen	5,830	7.78
	Rickenbach	2,826	1.57
	Sirnach	7,901	12.43
	Tobel-Tägerschen	1,589	7.07
	Wängi	4,766	16.41
	Wilen	2,523	2.26
	Total (13)	48,285	138.22
