= Wilen =

- Municipality
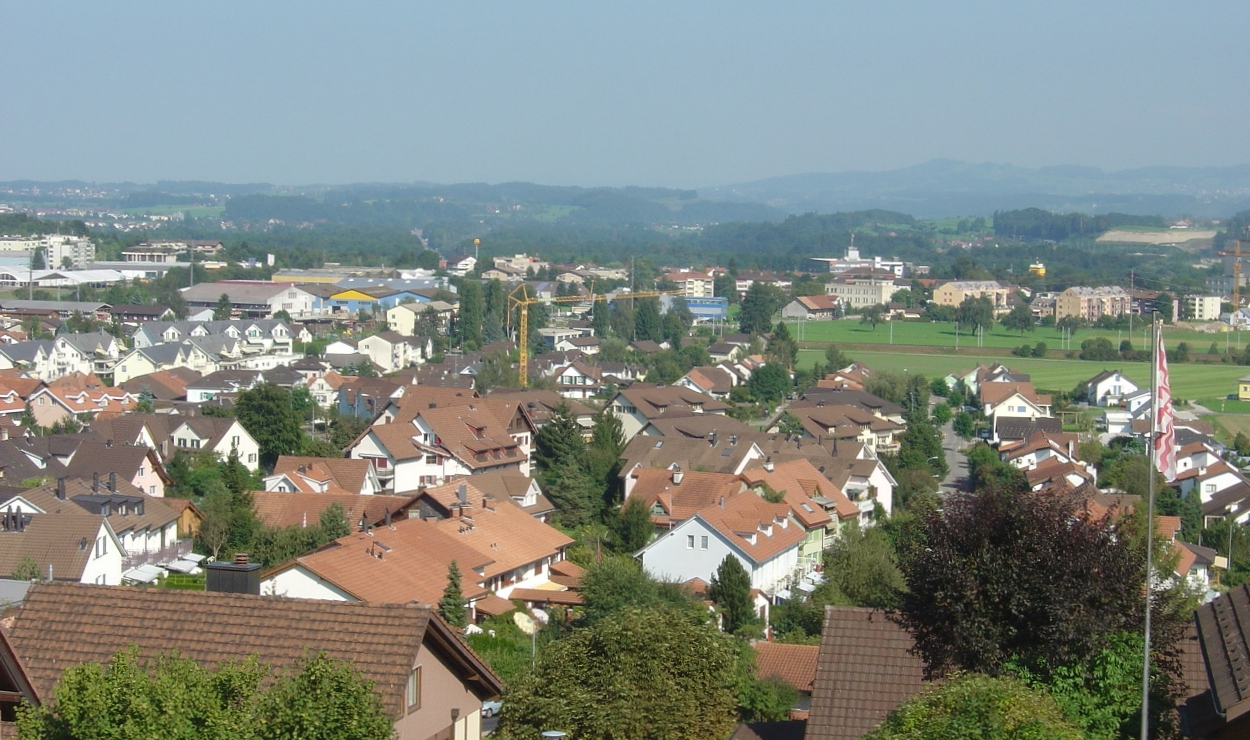

- Coat of arms
- Location of Wilen
- Location within Switzerland Location within Canton of Thurgau
- Coordinates: 47°27′N 9°2′E
- Country: Switzerland
- Canton: Thurgau
- District: Münchwilen

Area
  - Total: 2.27 km^{2} (0.88 sq mi)
- Elevation: 552 m (1,811 ft)

Population (December 2007)
  - Total: 2,029
  - Density: 894/km^{2} (2,320/sq mi)
- Time zone: UTC+01:00 (CET)
  - Summer (DST): UTC+02:00 (CEST)
- Postal code: 9535
- SFOS number: 4786
- ISO 3166 code: CH-TG
- Surrounded by: Kirchberg (SG), Rickenbach, Sirnach, Wil (SG)
- Website: wilen.ch

Wilen is a municipality in the district of Münchwilen in the canton of Thurgau in Switzerland. Prior to Thurgau's 1998 reorganisation, Wilen was known as Wilen bei Wil and was part of Rickenbach bei Wil, which was then broken up into the municipalities of Rickenbach and Wilen.

== Geography ==
Wilen has an area, as of 2009, of 2.27 square kilometers (0.88 sq mi). Of this area, 1.26 km^{2} (0.49 sq mi) or 55.5% is used for agricultural purposes, while 0.47 km^{2} (0.18 sq mi) or 20.7% is forested. Of the rest of the land, 0.47 km^{2} (0.18 sq mi) or 20.7% is settled (buildings or roads), 0.01 km^{2} (2.5 acres) or 0.4% is either rivers or lakes and 0.06 km^{2} (15 acres) or 2.6% is unproductive land.

Of the built up area, industrial buildings made up 15.0% of the total area while housing and buildings made up 0.9% and transportation infrastructure made up 0.0%. Power and water infrastructure as well as other special developed areas made up 1.3% of the area while parks, green belts and sports fields made up 3.5%. Out of the forested land, 18.9% of the total land area is heavily forested and 1.8% is covered with orchards or small clusters of trees. Of the agricultural land, 52.4% is used for growing crops, while 3.1% is used for orchards or vine crops. All the water in the municipality is flowing water.

== Demographics ==
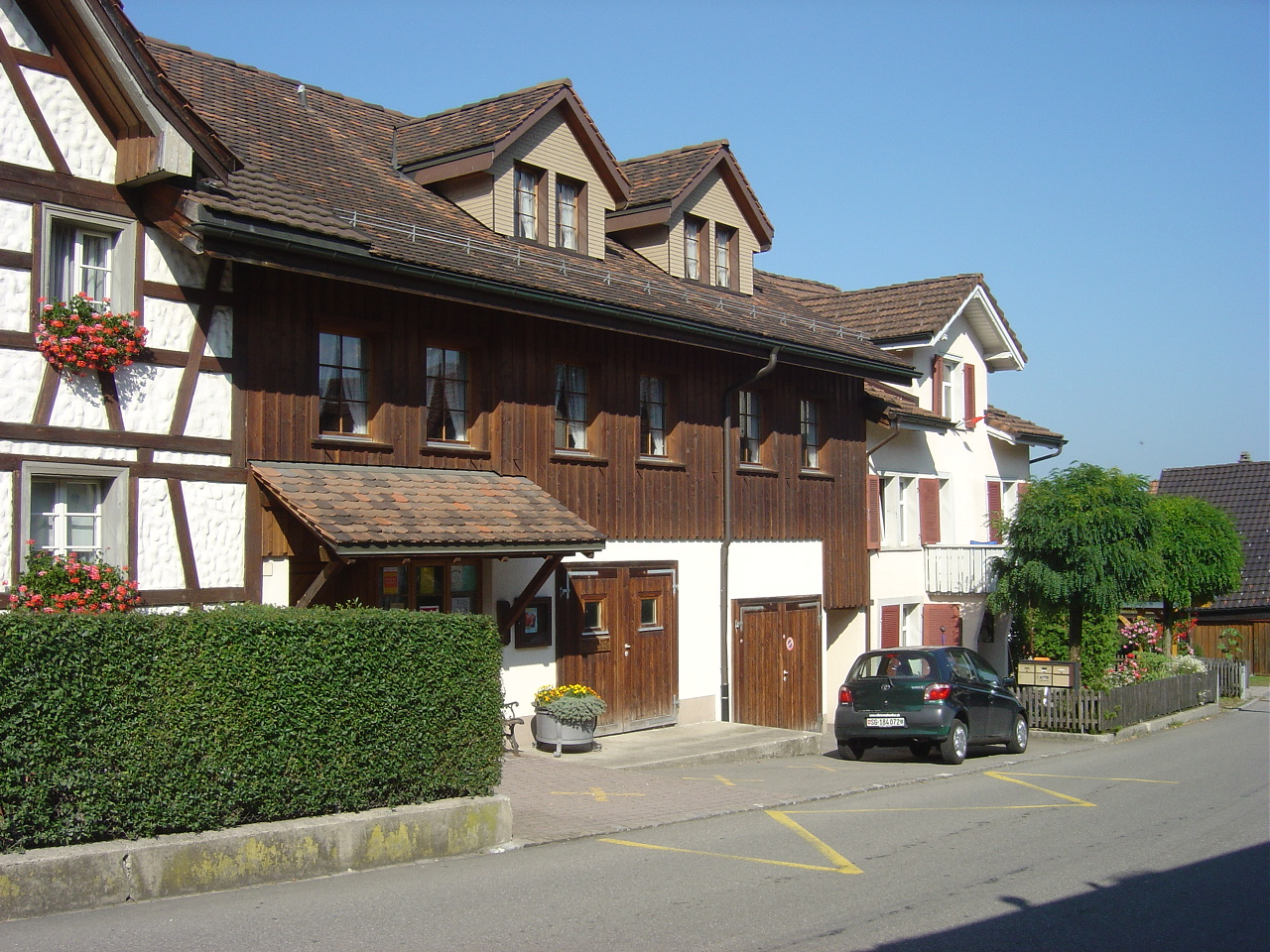
Dorfschur house in the center of Wilen

Wilen has a population (as of December 2020) of 2,523. As of 2008, 8.3% of the population are foreign nationals. Over the last 10 years (1997–2007) the population has changed at a rate of %. Most of the population (as of 2000) speaks German (95.4%), with Italian being second most common ( 1.6%) and English being third ( 0.6%).

As of 2008, the gender distribution of the population was 50.4% male and 49.6% female. The population was made up of 932 Swiss men (45.6% of the population), and 98 (4.8%) non-Swiss men. There were 940 Swiss women (46.0%), and 72 (3.5%) non-Swiss women.

In 2008 there were 24 live births to Swiss citizens and 2 births to non-Swiss citizens, and in same time span there were 9 deaths of Swiss citizens. Ignoring immigration and emigration, the population of Swiss citizens increased by 15 while the foreign population increased by 2. There were was 1 non-Swiss man who emigrated from Switzerland to another country and 3 non-Swiss women who emigrated from Switzerland to another country. The total Swiss population change in 2008 (from all sources) was an increase of 14 and the non-Swiss population change was a decrease of 2 people. This represents a population growth rate of 0.6%.

The age distribution, as of 2009, in Wilen is; 281 children or 13.7% of the population are between 0 and 9 years old and 299 teenagers or 14.5% are between 10 and 19. Of the adult population, 184 people or 8.9% of the population are between 20 and 29 years old. 270 people or 13.1% are between 30 and 39, 382 people or 18.6% are between 40 and 49, and 282 people or 13.7% are between 50 and 59. The senior population distribution is 182 people or 8.9% of the population are between 60 and 69 years old, 117 people or 5.7% are between 70 and 79, there are 50 people or 2.4% who are between 80 and 89, and there are 9 people or 0.4% who are 90 and older.

As of 2000, there were 659 private households in the municipality, and an average of 2.6 people per household. In 2000 there were 377 single family homes (or 89.3% of the total) out of a total of 422 inhabited buildings. There were 16 two family buildings (3.8%), 7 three family buildings (1.7%) and 22 multi-family buildings (or 5.2%). There were 400 (or 22.7%) people who were part of a couple without children, and 1,100 (or 62.5%) who were part of a couple with children. There were 63 (or 3.6%) people who lived in single parent home, while there are 10 people who were adult children living with one or both parents, 18 people who lived in a household made up of relatives, 7 who lived in a household made up of unrelated people, and 14 who are either institutionalized or live in another type of collective housing.

The vacancy rate for the municipality, in 2008, was 2.02%. As of 2007, the construction rate of new housing units was 10.8 new units per 1000 residents. In 2000 there were 695 apartments in the municipality. The most common apartment size was the 5 room apartment of which there were 224. There were 7 single room apartments and 140 apartments with six or more rooms.

In the 2007 federal election the most popular party was the SVP which received 34.55% of the vote. The next three most popular parties were the CVP (18.73%), the FDP (18.13%) and the Green Party (10.34%). In the federal election, a total of 658 votes were cast, and the voter turnout was 48.6%.

The historical population is given in the following table:

year	population
1950	640
1960	950
1980	1,049
1990	1,502
2000	1,760

== Economy ==
As of 2007, Wilen had an unemployment rate of 1%. As of 2005, there were 17 people employed in the primary economic sector and about 7 businesses involved in this sector. 83 people are employed in the secondary sector and there are 26 businesses in this sector. 161 people are employed in the tertiary sector, with 36 businesses in this sector.

In 2000 there were 1,240 workers who lived in the municipality. Of these, 792 or about 63.9% of the residents worked outside Wilen while 160 people commuted into the municipality for work. There were a total of 608 jobs (of at least 6 hours per week) in the municipality. Of the working population, 16.9% used public transportation to get to work, and 50.1% used a private car.

== Religion ==
From the 2000 census, 1,088 or 61.8% were Roman Catholic, while 457 or 26.0% belonged to the Swiss Reformed Church. Of the rest of the population, there are 3 individuals (or about 0.17% of the population) who belong to the Orthodox Church, and there are 51 individuals (or about 2.90% of the population) who belong to another Christian church. There were 10 (or about 0.57% of the population) who are Islamic. There are 10 individuals (or about 0.57% of the population) who belong to another church (not listed on the census), 100 (or about 5.68% of the population) belong to no church, are agnostic or atheist, and 41 individuals (or about 2.33% of the population) did not answer the question.

== Education ==
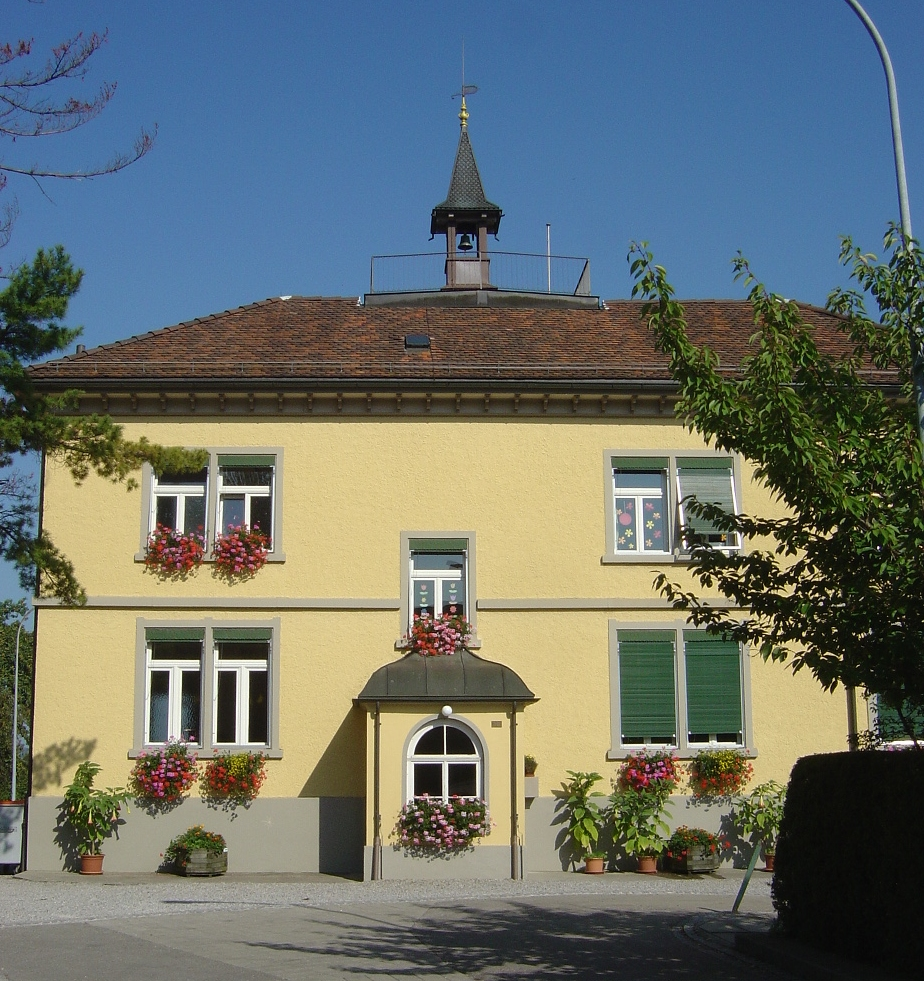
Old school house

In Wilen about 75.4% of the population (between age 25–64) have completed either non-mandatory upper secondary education or additional higher education (either university or a Fachhochschule).

Wilen is home to the Wilen bei Wil primary school district. It is also home to the Wilen bei Wil primary school district. In the 2008/2009 school year there were 238 students in the primary school district. There were 57 children in the kindergarten, and the average class size was 19 kindergartners. Of the children in kindergarten, 26 or 45.6% were female, 1 or 1.8% were not Swiss citizens. The lower and upper primary levels begin at about age 5–6 and last for 6 years. There were 87 children in who were at the lower primary level and 94 children in the upper primary level. The average class size in the primary school was 20.11 students. At the lower primary level, there were 47 children or 54.0% of the total population who were female, 7 or 8.0% were not Swiss citizens and 2 or 2.3% did not speak German natively. In the upper primary level, there were 34 or 36.2% who were female, 3 or 3.2% were not Swiss citizens and 3 or 3.2% did not speak German natively.
