= Fischingen =

- Municipality
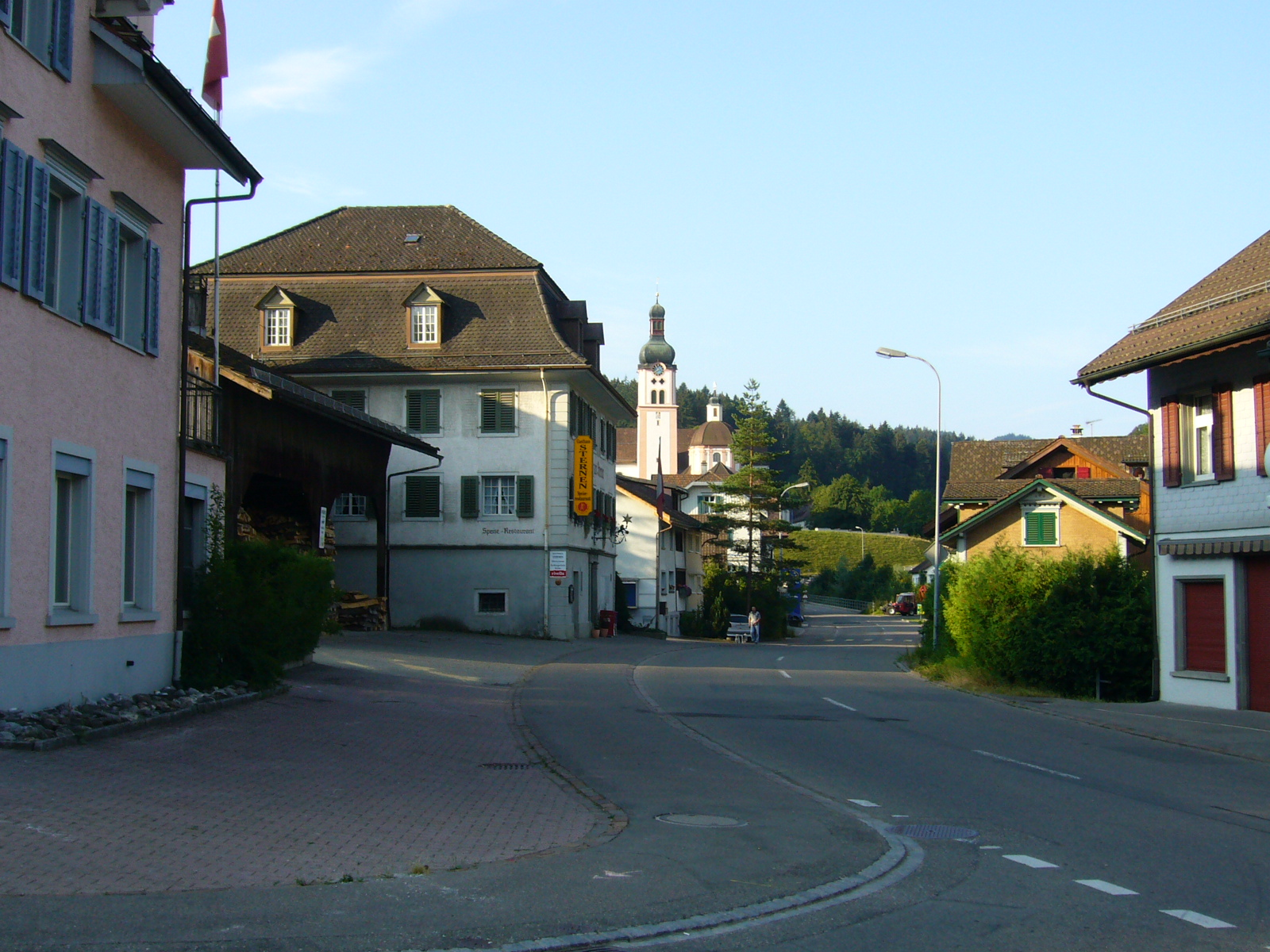
- Fischingen village

- Coat of arms
- Location of Fischingen
- Location within Switzerland Location within Canton of Thurgau
- Coordinates: 47°25′N 8°58′E
- Country: Switzerland
- Canton: Thurgau
- District: Münchwilen

Area
  - Total: 30.7 km^{2} (11.9 sq mi)
- Elevation: 625 m (2,051 ft)

Population (December 2007)
  - Total: 2,569
  - Density: 83.7/km^{2} (217/sq mi)
- Time zone: UTC+01:00 (CET)
  - Summer (DST): UTC+02:00 (CEST)
- Postal code: 8376
- SFOS number: 4726
- ISO 3166 code: CH-TG
- Surrounded by: Bichelsee-Balterswil, Eschlikon, Fischenthal (ZH), Kirchberg (SG), Mosnang (SG), Sirnach, Sternenberg (ZH), Turbenthal (ZH), Wila (ZH)
- Website: fischingen.ch

Fischingen (German pronunciation: [ˈfɪʃɪŋən]) is a municipality in the district of Münchwilen in the canton of Thurgau in Switzerland.

== History ==
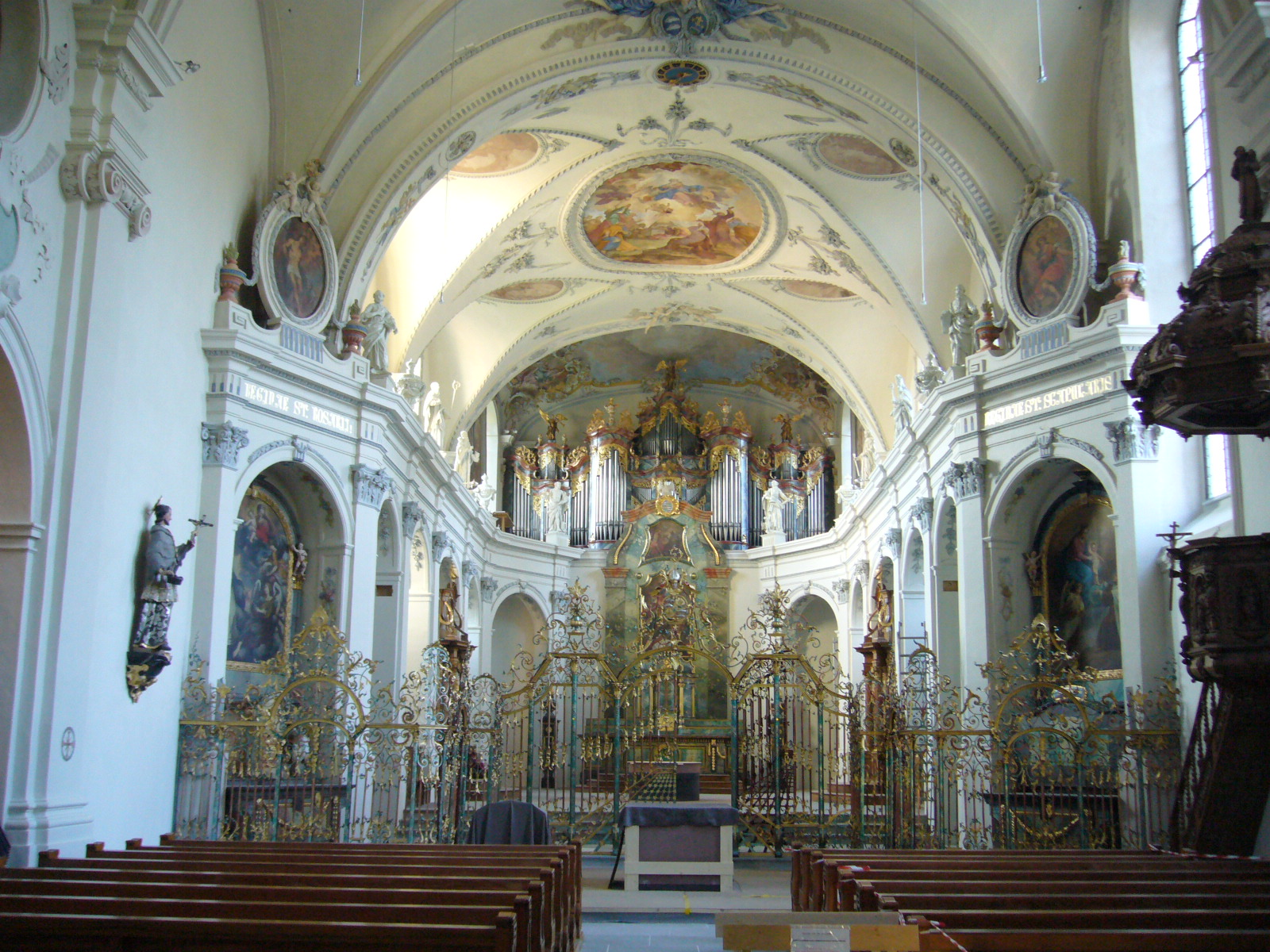
Interior of Fischingen Abbey Church

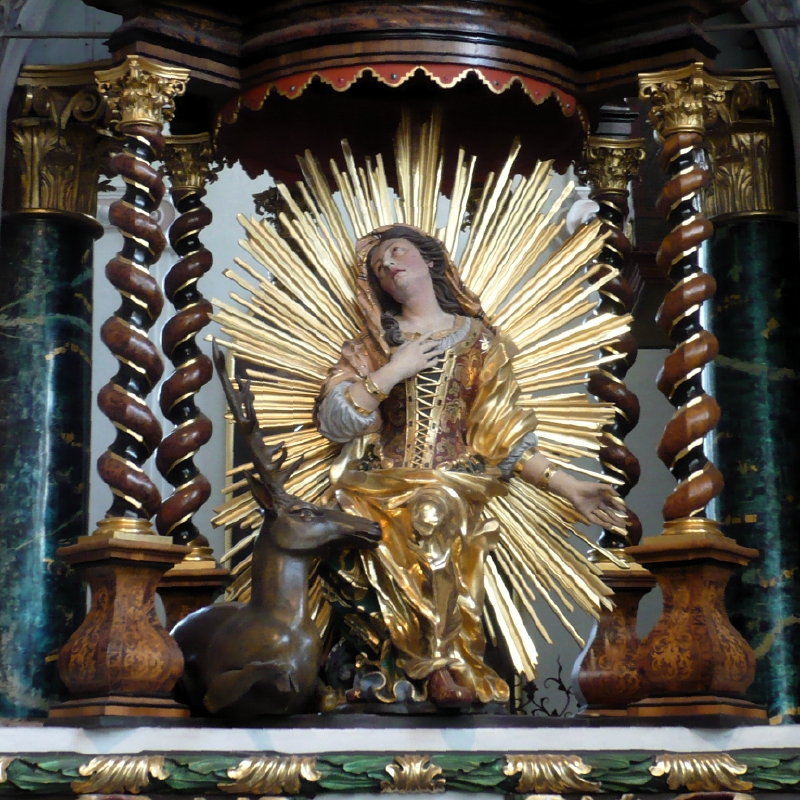
St. Ida statue

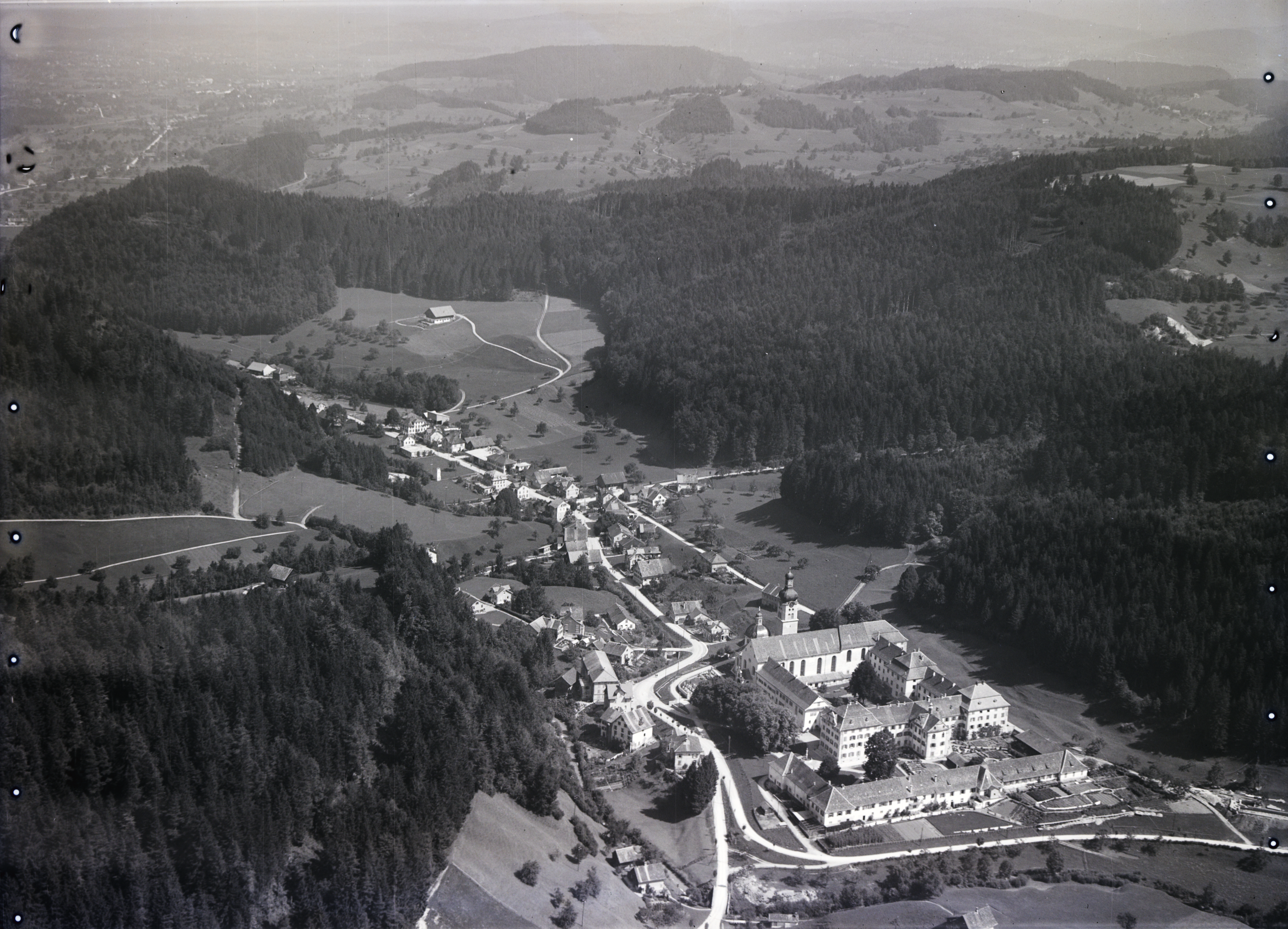
Aerial view from 500 m by Walter Mittelholzer (1934)

Fischingen is first mentioned in 1328 as Fischinon. In 1972, Dussnang, Fischingen, Oberwangen and Tannegg merged with Fischingen.

The village was built north of the twelfth-century Benedictine Fischingen Abbey. It was, together with Bichelsee, Balterswil, Ifwil, and probably Au, part of the old Fischinger court, which opened in 1432. It was closely connected to the Tannegg Amt, which bought the Abbey in 1693.

The Catholic village church was supported by the Abbey, while the Reformed minority belonged to the Dussnang parish. In 1848 the Abbey was closed and the Abbey church became the center of a new, separate parish. The church was located on the way to Einsiedeln and its pilgrimage church, so in 16th and 17th Centuries a small pilgrimage industry grew up in Fischingen. The pilgrimage chapel grew up around the grave of Saint Ida of Toggenburg, who had lived in the Abbey. In the 17th and 18th centuries the premises were rebuilt in the Baroque and Rococo styles. Between 1685 and 1687 a new abbey church was constructed, and in 1705 a new chapel dedicated to Saint Ida. In the 18th century part of the monastic premises was rebuilt, but could not be completed because of the abbey's accumulated debts.

== Geography ==
Fischingen has an area, as of 2009, of 30.62 square kilometers (11.82 sq mi). Of this area, 14.58 km^{2} (5.63 sq mi) or 47.6% is used for agricultural purposes, while 14.16 km^{2} (5.47 sq mi) or 46.2% is forested. Of the rest of the land, 1.79 km^{2} (0.69 sq mi) or 5.8% is settled (buildings or roads), 0.06 km^{2} (15 acres) or 0.2% is either rivers or lakes and 0.1 km^{2} (25 acres) or 0.3% is unproductive land.

Of the built up area, industrial buildings made up 2.5% of the total area while housing and buildings made up 0.3% and transportation infrastructure made up 0.5%. while parks, green belts and sports fields made up 2.4%. Out of the forested land, 42.8% of the total land area is heavily forested and 3.5% is covered with orchards or small clusters of trees. Of the agricultural land, 45.3% is used for growing crops, while 1.6% is used for orchards or vine crops. All the water in the municipality is flowing water.

The municipality is located in the Münchwilen district, on the northern foot of the Hörnli. It consists of the villages of Fischingen, Au, Dussnang, Oberwangen and Tannegg as well as over 100 scattered settlements.

== Demographics ==
Fischingen has a population (as of December 2020) of 2,836 As of 2008, 7.8% of the population are foreign nationals. Over the last 10 years (1997–2007) the population has changed at a rate of -0.1%. Most of the population (as of 2000) speaks German(96.2%), with Albanian being second most common ( 1.0%) and Serbo-Croatian being third ( 0.6%).

As of 2008, the gender distribution of the population was 51.0% male and 49.0% female. The population was made up of 1,225 Swiss men (47.0% of the population), and 104 (4.0%) non-Swiss men. There were 1,178 Swiss women (45.2%), and 99 (3.8%) non-Swiss women.

In 2008 there were 16 live births to Swiss citizens and 2 births to non-Swiss citizens, and in same time span there were 15 deaths of Swiss citizens. Ignoring immigration and emigration, the population of Swiss citizens increased by 1 while the foreign population increased by 2. There were 3 Swiss women who emigrated from Switzerland to another country, 6 non-Swiss men who emigrated from Switzerland to another country and 10 non-Swiss women who emigrated from Switzerland to another country. The total Swiss population change in 2008 (from all sources) was an increase of 9 and the non-Swiss population change was an increase of 26 people. This represents a population growth rate of 1.4%.

The age distribution, as of 2009, in Fischingen is; 257 children or 10.0% of the population are between 0 and 9 years old and 360 teenagers or 14.1% are between 10 and 19. Of the adult population, 286 people or 11.2% of the population are between 20 and 29 years old. 274 people or 10.7% are between 30 and 39, 482 people or 18.8% are between 40 and 49, and 373 people or 14.6% are between 50 and 59. The senior population distribution is 259 people or 10.1% of the population are between 60 and 69 years old, 143 people or 5.6% are between 70 and 79, there are 108 people or 4.2% who are between 80 and 89, and there are 20 people or 0.8% who are 90 and older.

As of 2000, there were 932 private households in the municipality, and an average of 2.7 persons per household. In 2000 there were 440 single family homes (or 85.3% of the total) out of a total of 516 inhabited buildings. There were 49 two family buildings (9.5%), 8 three family buildings (1.6%) and 19 multi-family buildings (or 3.7%). There were 476 (or 18.3%) persons who were part of a couple without children, and 1,616 (or 62.0%) who were part of a couple with children. There were 99 (or 3.8%) people who lived in single parent home, while there are 16 persons who were adult children living with one or both parents, 19 persons who lived in a household made up of relatives, 15 who lived in a household made up of unrelated persons, and 94 who are either institutionalized or live in another type of collective housing.

The vacancy rate for the municipality, in 2008, was 1.74%. As of 2007, the construction rate of new housing units was 7 new units per 1000 residents. In 2000 there were 1,007 apartments in the municipality. The most common apartment size was the 6 room apartment of which there were 276. There were 23 single room apartments and 276 apartments with six or more rooms. As of 2000 the average price to rent an average apartment in Fischingen was 1074.61 Swiss francs (CHF) per month (US$860, £480, €690 approx. exchange rate from 2000). The average rate for a one-room apartment was 597.50 CHF (US$480, £270, €380), a two-room apartment was about 779.21 CHF (US$620, £350, €500), a three-room apartment was about 883.58 CHF (US$710, £400, €570) and a six or more room apartment cost an average of 1532.28 CHF (US$1230, £690, €980). The average apartment price in Fischingen was 96.3% of the national average of 1116 CHF.

In the 2007 federal election the most popular party was the SVP which received 46.35% of the vote. The next three most popular parties were the CVP (22.58%), the Green Party (10.88%) and the FDP (7.3%). In the federal election, a total of 1,003 votes were cast, and the voter turnout was 52.4%.

The historical population is given in the following table:

year	population
1850	2,125
1900	2,570
1950	2,484
1970	2,248
1980	2,100
2000	2,605

== Heritage sites of national significance ==
St. Martins Chapel, the Catholic Church of Dussnang, the Benedictine Monastery (now Priory) with Church and Ida Chapel and the ruins of Tannegg Castle are listed as Swiss heritage site of national significance. The entire Fischingen Monastery site is part of the Inventory of Swiss Heritage Sites.

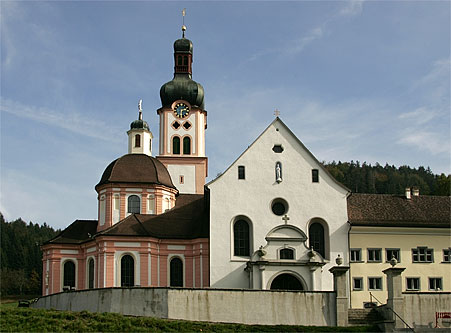
Fischingen Monastery

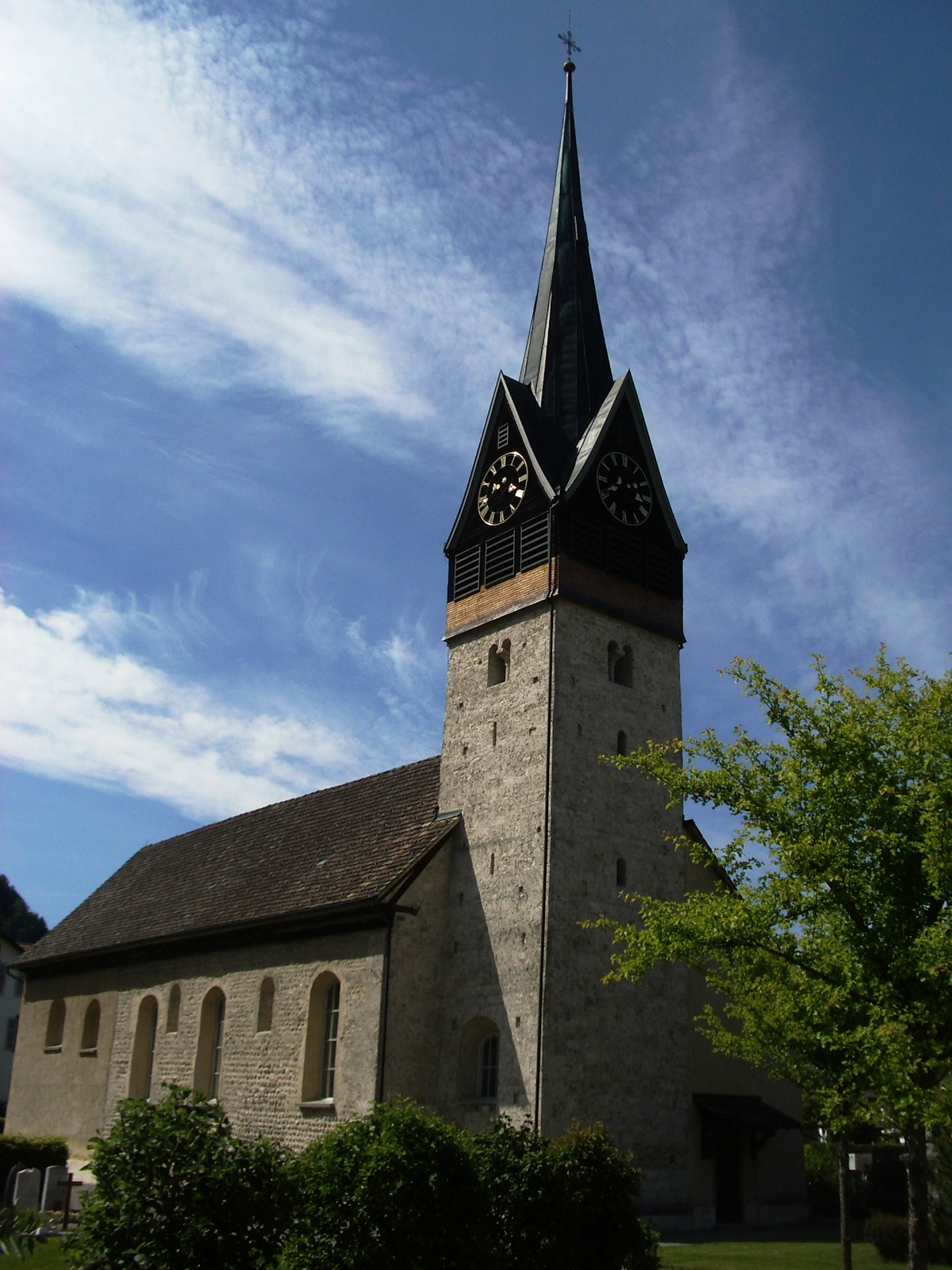
Church of Dussnang

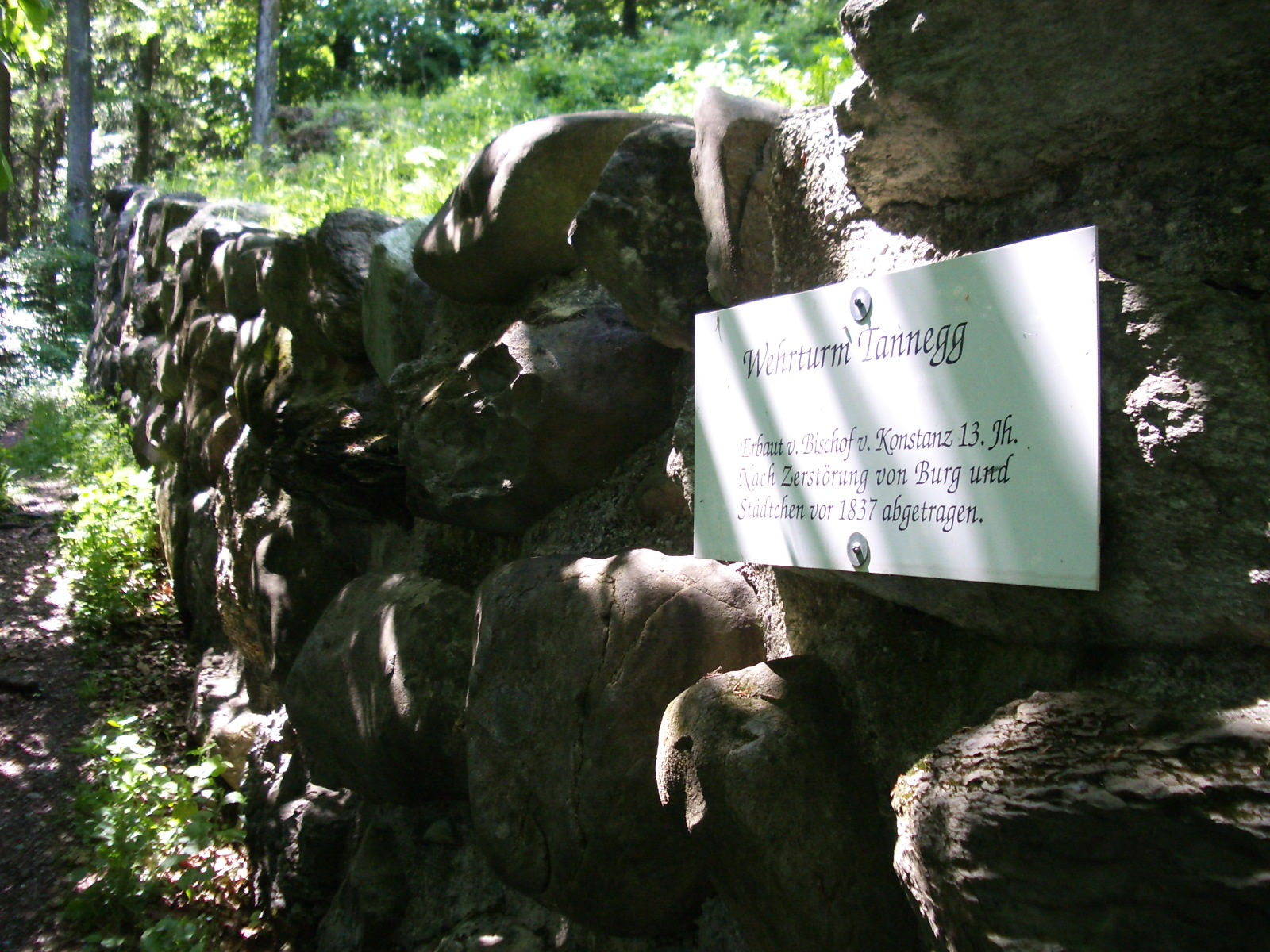
Dussnang Castle ruins

== Economy ==
As of 2007, Fischingen had an unemployment rate of 0.86%. As of 2005, there were 233 people employed in the primary economic sector and about 98 businesses involved in this sector. 321 people are employed in the secondary sector and there are 51 businesses in this sector. 538 people are employed in the tertiary sector, with 88 businesses in this sector. In 2000 there were 1,862 workers who lived in the municipality. Of these, 734 or about 39.4% of the residents worked outside Fischingen while 377 people commuted into the municipality for work. There were a total of 1,505 jobs (of at least 6 hours per week) in the municipality. Of the working population, 6.7% used public transportation to get to work, and 44.1% used a private car.

== Religion ==
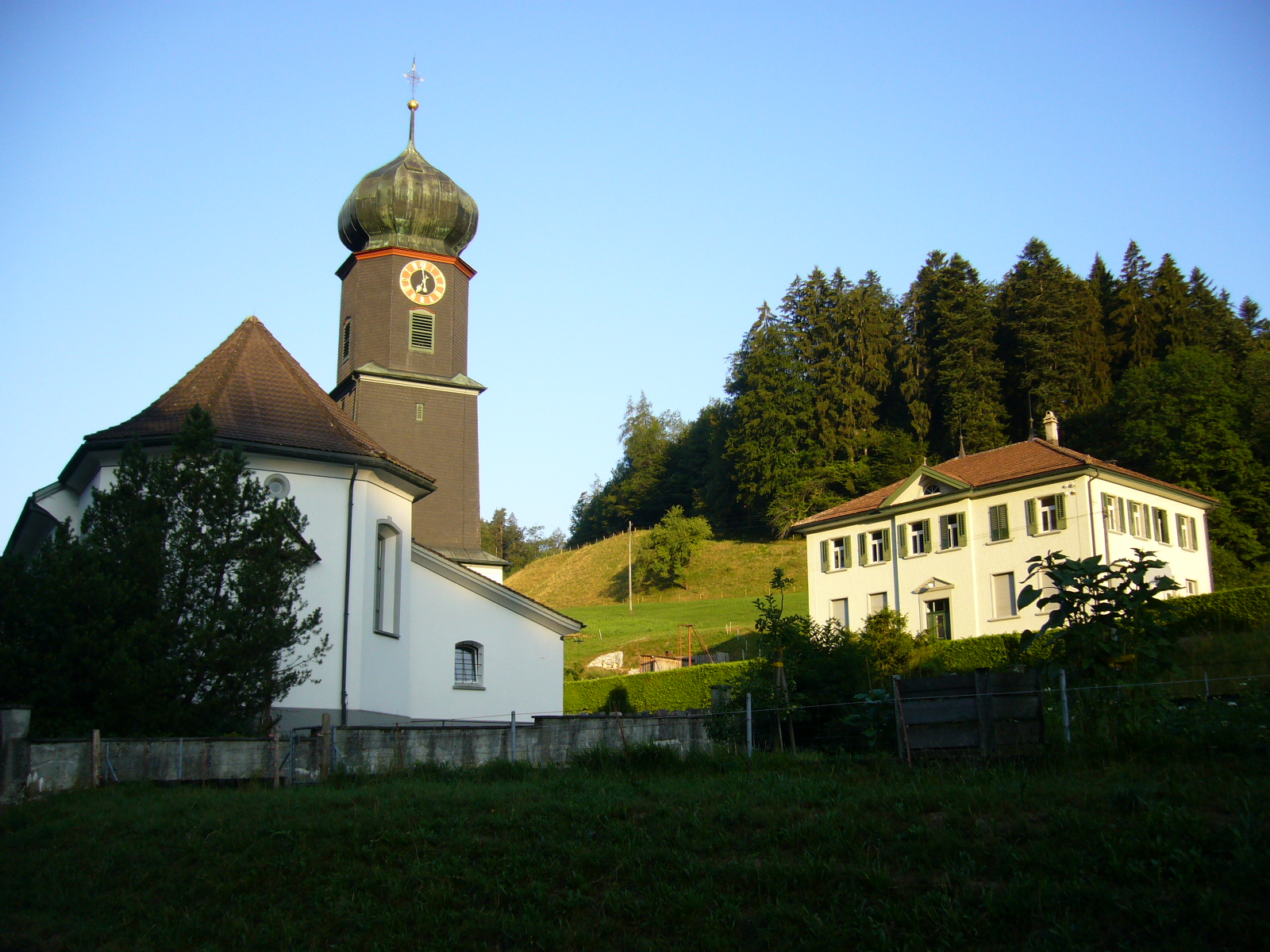
Chapel in Au village

From the 2000 census, 1,403 or 53.9% were Roman Catholic, while 816 or 31.3% belonged to the Swiss Reformed Church. Of the rest of the population, there were 3 Old Catholics (or about 0.12% of the population) who belonged to the Christian Catholic Church of Switzerland there are 9 individuals (or about 0.35% of the population) who belong to the Orthodox Church, and there are 54 individuals (or about 2.07% of the population) who belong to another Christian church. There was 1 individual who was Jewish, and 51 (or about 1.96% of the population) who are Islamic. There are 10 individuals (or about 0.38% of the population) who belong to another church (not listed on the census), 165 (or about 6.33% of the population) belong to no church, are agnostic or atheist, and 93 individuals (or about 3.57% of the population) did not answer the question.

== Education ==
The entire Swiss population is generally well educated. In Fischingen about 73.5% of the population (between age 25–64) have completed either non-mandatory upper secondary education or additional higher education (either university or a Fachhochschule).

Fischingen is home to the Fischingen primary and secondary school district. In the 2008/2009 school year there were 298 students at either the primary or secondary levels. There were 59 children in the kindergarten, and the average class size was 19.67 kindergartners. Of the children in kindergarten, 32 or 54.2% were female, 1 or 1.7% were not Swiss citizens and 1 or 1.7% did not speak German natively. The lower and upper primary levels begin at about age 5-6 and last for 6 years. There were 94 children in who were at the lower primary level and 102 children in the upper primary level. The average class size in the primary school was 21.78 students. At the lower primary level, there were 39 children or 41.5% of the total population who were female, 5 or 5.3% were not Swiss citizens and 4 or 4.3% did not speak German natively. In the upper primary level, there were 48 or 47.1% who were female and 1 or 1.0% who was not a Swiss citizen.

At the secondary level, students are divided according to performance. The secondary level begins at about age 12 and usually lasts 3 years. There were 59 teenagers who were in the advanced school, of which 38 or 64.4% were female, 2 or 3.4% were not Swiss citizens and 2 or 3.4% did not speak German natively. There were 43 teenagers who were in the standard school, of which 16 or 37.2% were female, 4 or 9.3% were not Swiss citizens and 3 or 7.0% did not speak German natively. The average class size for all classes at the secondary level was 17 students.
