= Bütschwil-Ganterschwil =

- Municipality
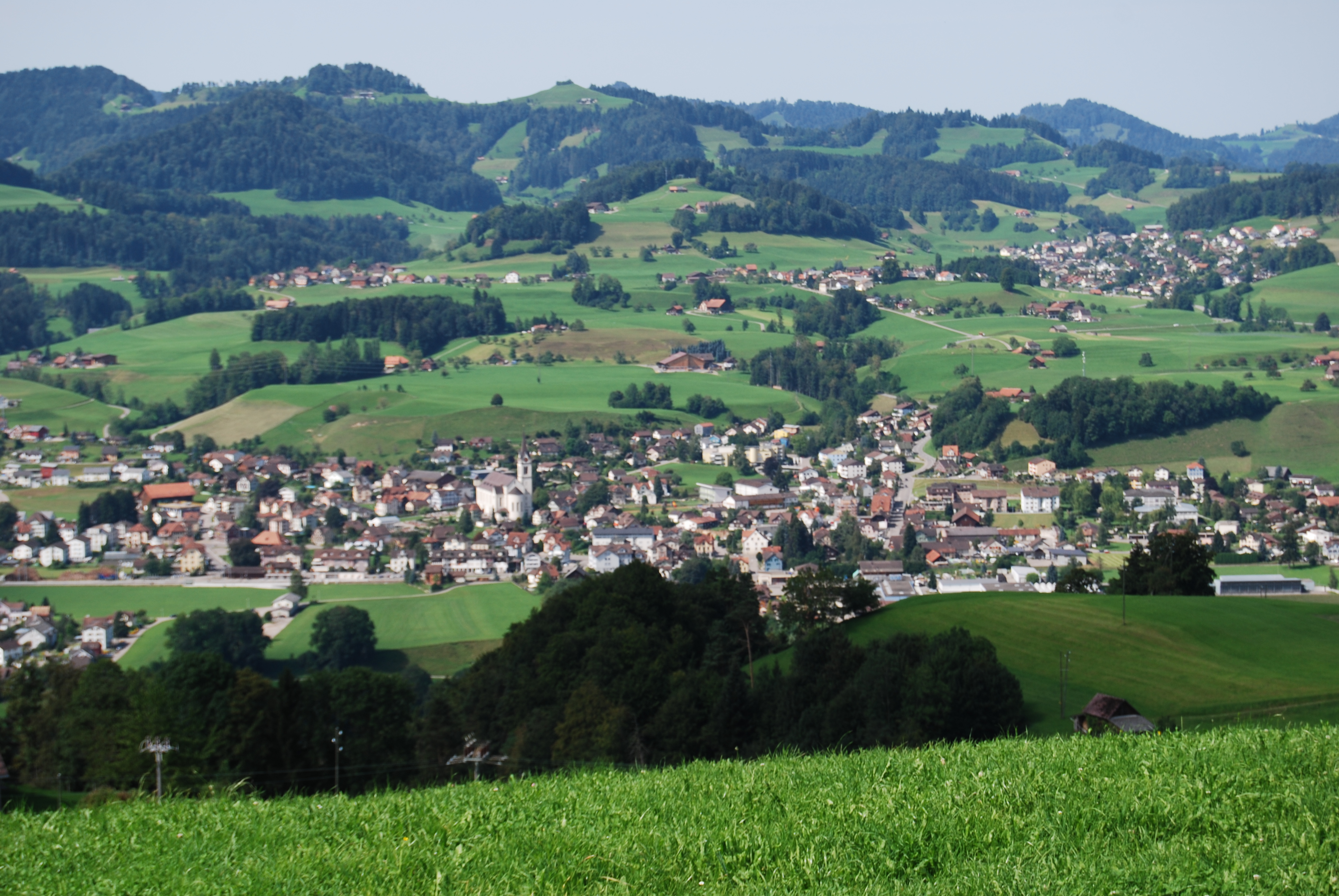
- Bütschwil village

- Coat of arms
- Location of Bütschwil-Ganterschwil
- Location within Switzerland Location within Canton of St. Gallen
- Coordinates: 47°21′N 9°4′E
- Country: Switzerland
- Canton: St. Gallen
- District: Toggenburg

Area
  - Total: 21.81 km^{2} (8.42 sq mi)
- Elevation: 610 m (2,000 ft)
- Highest elevation (Sedelberg): 942 m (3,091 ft)
- Lowest elevation (Thur river): 555 m (1,821 ft)

Population (Dec 2011)
  - Total: 4,561
  - Density: 209.1/km^{2} (541.6/sq mi)
- Time zone: UTC+01:00 (CET)
  - Summer (DST): UTC+02:00 (CEST)
- Postal code: 9606 / 9608
- SFOS number: 3395
- ISO 3166 code: CH-SG
- Surrounded by: Ganterschwil, Krinau, Lichtensteig, Lütisburg, Mosnang, Oberhelfenschwil, Wattwil
- Website: www.buetschwil-ganterschwil.ch

Bütschwil-Ganterschwil is a municipality in the Wahlkreis (constituency) of Toggenburg in the canton of St. Gallen in Switzerland. On 1 January 2013 the former municipalities of Bütschwil and Ganterschwil merged to form the new municipality of Bütschwil-Ganterschwil.

== History ==
Bütschwil is first mentioned in 779 as Bucinesvilare.

Ganterschwil is first mentioned in 779 as Cantrichesuilare.

== Geography ==
Aerial view (1958)

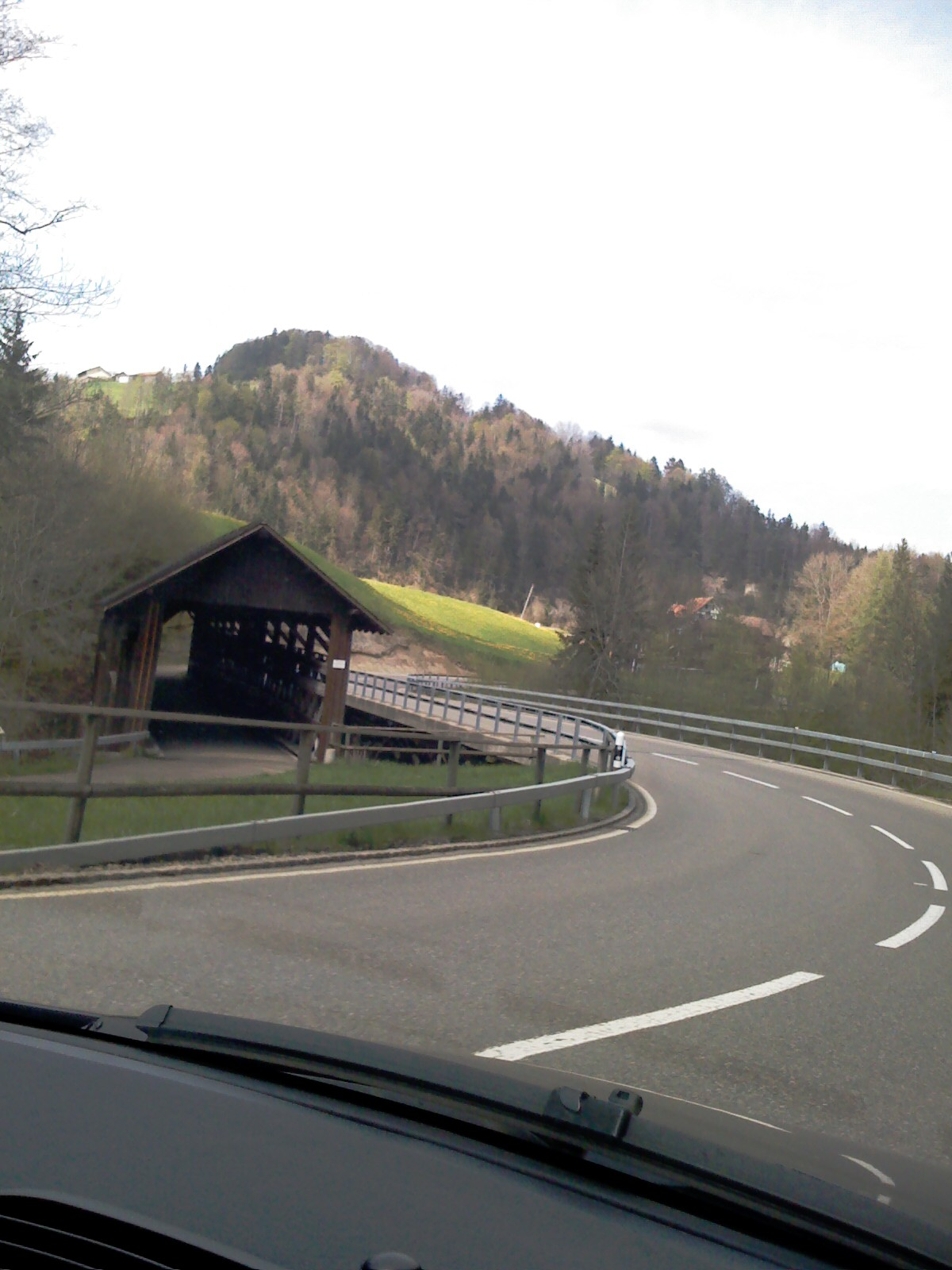
Wooden bridge between Mogelsberg and Ganterschwil

The former municipalities that now make up Bütschwil-Ganterschwil have a total combined area of 21.83 km^{2} (8.43 sq mi).

Bütschwil had an area, as of 2006, of 13.7 km^{2} (5.3 sq mi). Of this area, 66.3% is used for agricultural purposes, while 19.8% is forested. Of the rest of the land, 12.4% is settled (buildings or roads) and the remainder (1.5%) is non-productive (rivers or lakes). The former municipality is located along the Thur river. On the left bank of the Thur, it consists of the linear villages of Bütschwil and Dietfurt and the hamlets of Grämigen, Tierhag, Feld, Kengelbach and Zwiselen. While on the right bank are the hamlets of Langensteig and Laufen.

Ganterschwil had an area, as of 2006, of 8.1 km^{2} (3.1 sq mi). Of this area, 63.8% is used for agricultural purposes, while 26.2% is forested. Of the rest of the land, 7% is settled (buildings or roads) and the remainder (3%) is non-productive (rivers or lakes). The former municipality is located on a high plateau between the Thur and Neckar rivers. It consists of the village of Ganterschwil and the hamlets of Äwil, Anzenwil, Bleiken, Ötschwil and Tobel as well as scattered individual farm houses.

== Demographics ==
The total population of Bütschwil-Ganterschwil (as of December 2020) is 5,041.

== Historic Population ==
The historical population is given in the following chart:

== Transport ==
Bütschwil-Ganterschwil sits on the Wil–Ebnat-Kappel line between Wattwil and Wil and is served by the St. Gallen S-Bahn at Bütschwil and Dietfurt.

== Sights ==
The village of Bütschwil is designated as part of the Inventory of Swiss Heritage Sites.
