= Hulftegg Pass =

Mountain pass in Switzerland

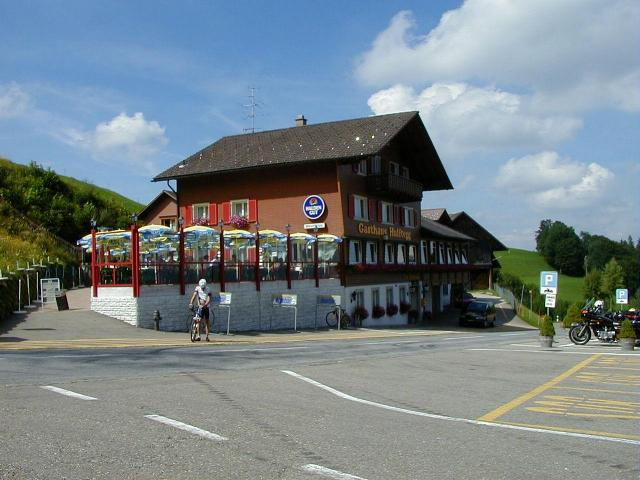
- Hulftegg Pass and restaurant

- Location within Switzerland Location within Canton of St. Gallen Location within Canton of Zurich
- Elevation: 954 metres (3,130 ft)

Third Approach
- Location: Switzerland
- Coordinates: 47°21′44″N 8°58′0″E

Hulftegg Pass is a mountain pass in the Appenzell Alps between the Swiss cantons of Zurich and St. Gallen, located at 954 metres (3,130 ft) altitude.

It connects Mühlrüti in the municipality of Mosnang and Steg in the municipality of Fischenthal in the Töss Valley. The road is also served by a PostAuto bus route that operates between Bütschwil railway station and the pass summit, which is extended to Steg during the warmer months.

The pass lies between the Toggenburg region in the canton of St. Gallen and the Töss Valley in the canton of Zurich. The pass road has a maximum grade of 10 percent. At the summit, located in the canton of St. Gallen, there is a popular restaurant, called Gasthaus Hulftegg, with a large parking lot and nearby bus stop. From the pass, there are hiking trails to climb the surrounding peaks, including the Hörnli and the Schnebelhorn.

== See also ==
- List of mountain passes in Switzerland
- List of restaurants in Switzerland
