= Kirchberg, St. Gallen =

Kirchberg
- Municipality
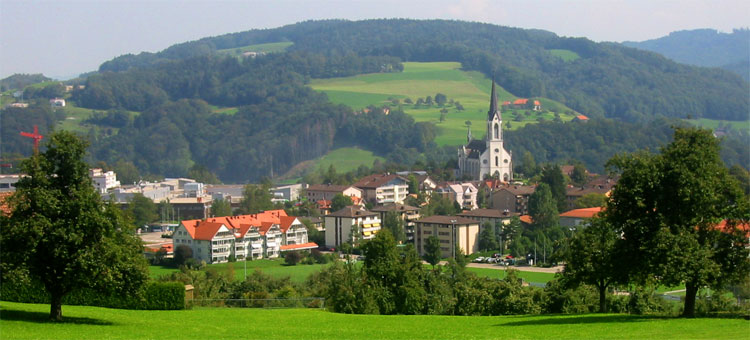
- Kirchberg Bazenheid village

- Flag Coat of arms
- Location of Kirchberg
- Location within Switzerland Location within Canton of St. Gallen
- Coordinates: 47°24′N 9°2′E
- Country: Switzerland
- Canton: St. Gallen
- District: Toggenburg

Government
  - Mayor: Christoph Häne

Area
  - Total: 42.59 km^{2} (16.44 sq mi)
- Elevation: 735 m (2,411 ft)

Population (December 2020)
  - Total: 9,241
  - Density: 217.0/km^{2} (562.0/sq mi)
- Time zone: UTC+01:00 (CET)
  - Summer (DST): UTC+02:00 (CEST)
- Postal code: 9533
- SFOS number: 3392
- ISO 3166 code: CH-SG
- Surrounded by: Fischingen (TG), Jonschwil, Lütisburg, Mosnang, Rickenbach (TG), Sirnach (TG), Wilen (TG)
- Website: www.kirchberg.ch

Kirchberg (Swiss Standard German pronunciation: [ˈkɪrçbɛrɡ]) is a municipality in the Wahlkreis (constituency) of Toggenburg in the canton of St. Gallen in Switzerland.

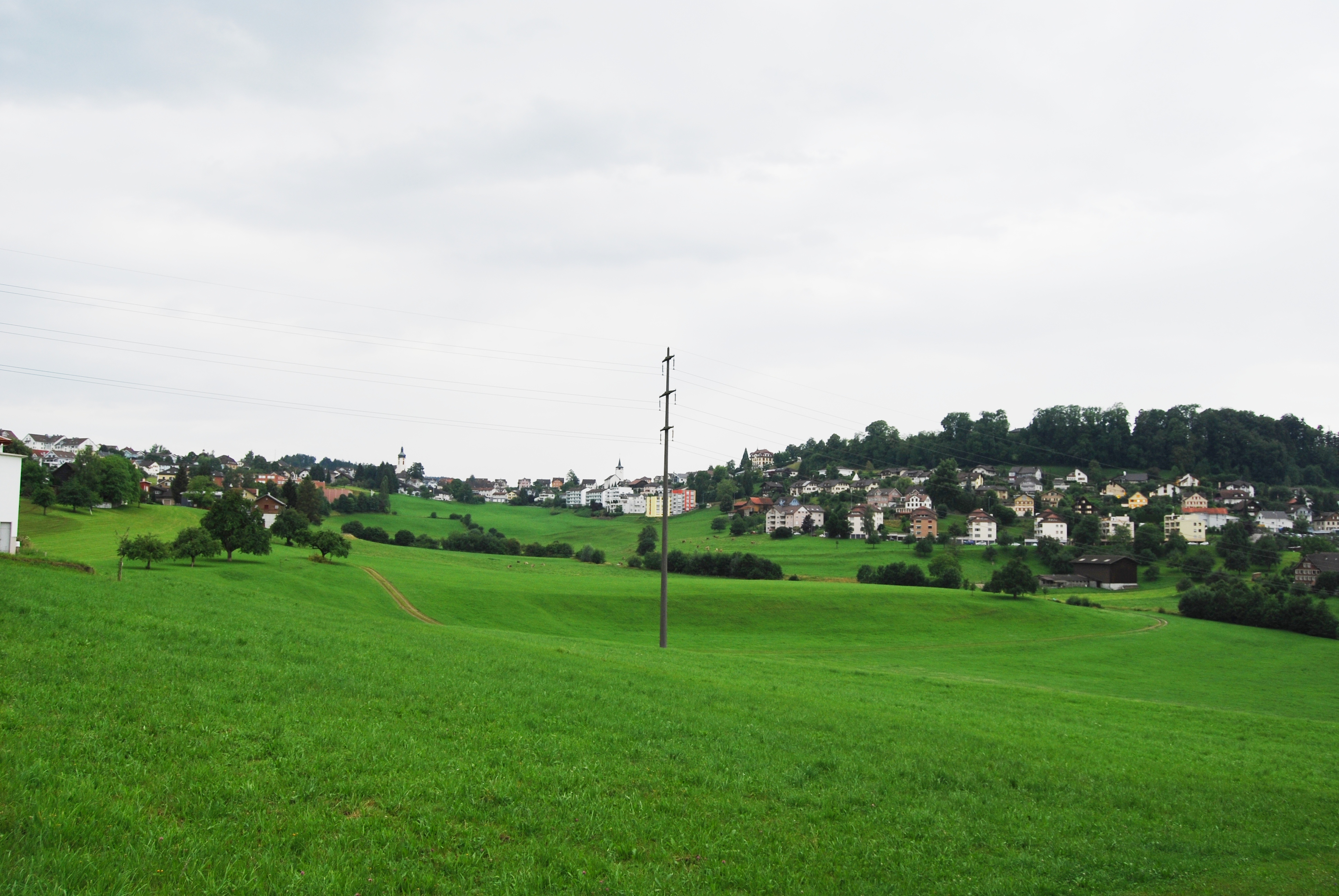
Kirchberg

== History ==
Kirchberg is first mentioned in 1222 as Kilchberc.

== Geography ==
Aerial view from 500 m by Walter Mittelholzer (1929)

Kirchberg has an area, as of 2006, of 42.6 km^{2} (16.4 sq mi). Of this area, 59.5% is used for agricultural purposes, while 30.9% is forested. Of the rest of the land, 9% is settled (buildings or roads) and the remainder (0.6%) is non-productive (rivers or lakes).

The municipality is located in the Toggenburg Wahlkreis. It is the most north-western municipality in the Wahlkreis and in bordered in the west by canton Thurgau and in the east by the Thur river. It consists of the village of Kirchberg on a high plateau in the center of the municipality, the village of Gähwil south of Kirchberg and the linear village of Bazenheid on a terrace above the Thur. Additionally, scattered around the municipality, there are the hamlets of Müselbach, Dietschwil, Ötwil, Nuetenwil, Rupperswil, Bräägg, Schalkhusen, Wolfikon, Lütenriet, Buomberg, Bäbikon and Husen.

== Coat of arms ==
The blazon of the municipal coat of arms is Per pall Or a Lion rampant Gules crowned Argent and Or a Semi Eagle displayed issuant Azure langued Gules and crowned Argent.

== Demographics ==
Kirchberg has a population (as of 31 December 2020) of 9,241. As of 2007, about 22.9% of the population was made up of foreign nationals. Of the foreign population, (as of 2000), 102 are from Germany, 187 are from Italy, 1,002 are from ex-Yugoslavia, 34 are from Austria, 284 are from Turkey, and 211 are from another country. Over the last 10 years the population has grown at a rate of 2.3%. Most of the population (as of 2000) speaks German (86.4%), with Albanian being second most common ( 4.7%) and Serbo-Croatian being third ( 2.4%). Of the Swiss national languages (as of 2000), 6,829 speak German, 15 people speak French, 134 people speak Italian, and 7 people speak Romansh.

The age distribution, as of 2000, in Kirchberg is; 1,148 children or 14.5% of the population are between 0 and 9 years old and 1,235 teenagers or 15.6% are between 10 and 19. Of the adult population, 901 people or 11.4% of the population are between 20 and 29 years old. 1,286 people or 16.3% are between 30 and 39, 1,170 people or 14.8% are between 40 and 49, and 792 people or 10.0% are between 50 and 59. The senior population distribution is 577 people or 7.3% of the population are between 60 and 69 years old, 483 people or 6.1% are between 70 and 79, there are 250 people or 3.2% who are between 80 and 89, and there are 61 people or 0.8% who are between 90 and 99, and 1 person who is 100 or more.

In 2000 there were 709 people (or 9.0% of the population) who were living alone in a private dwelling. There were 1,447 (or 18.3%) persons who were part of a couple (married or otherwise committed) without children, and 5,004 (or 63.3%) who were part of a couple with children. There were 353 (or 4.5%) people who lived in single parent home, while there are 68 persons who were adult children living with one or both parents, 37 persons who lived in a household made up of relatives, 39 who lived household made up of unrelated persons, and 247 who are either institutionalized or live in another type of collective housing.

In the 2007 federal election the most popular party was the SVP which received 37.9% of the vote. The next three most popular parties were the CVP (31.1%), the SP (11.5%) and the FDP (9.6%).

The entire Swiss population is generally well educated. In Kirchberg about 63.1% of the population (between age 25-64) have completed either non-mandatory upper secondary education or additional higher education (either university or a Fachhochschule). Out of the total population in Kirchberg, as of 2000, the highest education level completed by 1,911 people (24.2% of the population) was Primary, while 2,614 (33.1%) have completed Secondary, 565 (7.1%) have attended a Tertiary school, and 420 (5.3%) are not in school. The remainder did not answer this question.

The historical population is given in the following table:

year	population
1827	2,550
1850	4,194
1900	5,025
1950	5,619
2000	7,904

== Heritage sites of national significance ==
The catholic parish and pilgrimage church of St. Peter and Paul is listed as a Swiss heritage site of national significance. The hamlet of Bäbikon is designated as part of the Inventory of Swiss Heritage Sites.

== Economy ==
As of 2007, Kirchberg had an unemployment rate of 1.79%. As of 2005, there were 467 people employed in the primary economic sector and about 186 businesses involved in this sector. 1,962 people are employed in the secondary sector and there are 120 businesses in this sector. 1,705 people are employed in the tertiary sector, with 232 businesses in this sector.

As of October 2009 the average unemployment rate was 4.1%. There were 543 businesses in the municipality of which 132 were involved in the secondary sector of the economy while 232 were involved in the third.

As of 2000 there were 2,107 residents who worked in the municipality, while 1,789 residents worked outside Kirchberg and 1,561 people commuted into the municipality for work.

== Religion ==
From the 2000 census, 4,820 or 61.0% are Roman Catholic, while 1,370 or 17.3% belonged to the Swiss Reformed Church. Of the rest of the population, there are 13 individuals (or about 0.16% of the population) who belong to the Christian Catholic faith, there are 243 individuals (or about 3.07% of the population) who belong to the Orthodox Church, and there are 87 individuals (or about 1.10% of the population) who belong to another Christian church. There are 2 individuals (or about 0.03% of the population) who are Jewish, and 802 (or about 10.15% of the population) who are Islamic. There are 31 individuals (or about 0.39% of the population) who belong to another church (not listed on the census), 304 (or about 3.85% of the population) belong to no church, are agnostic or atheist, and 232 individuals (or about 2.94% of the population) did not answer the question.

== Transport ==
Kirchberg sits on the Wil–Ebnat-Kappel line between Wattwil and Wil and is served by the St. Gallen S-Bahn at Bazenheid railway station.

== Notable people ==
- Arthur Wittwer (born 1927) a Swiss long-distance runner, competed in the marathon at the 1960 Summer Olympics
- Ida of Toggenburg (c. 1140 – c. 1226) a nun and a Catholic saint
