= Dietfurt railway station =

Train station in Switzerland

Dietfurt
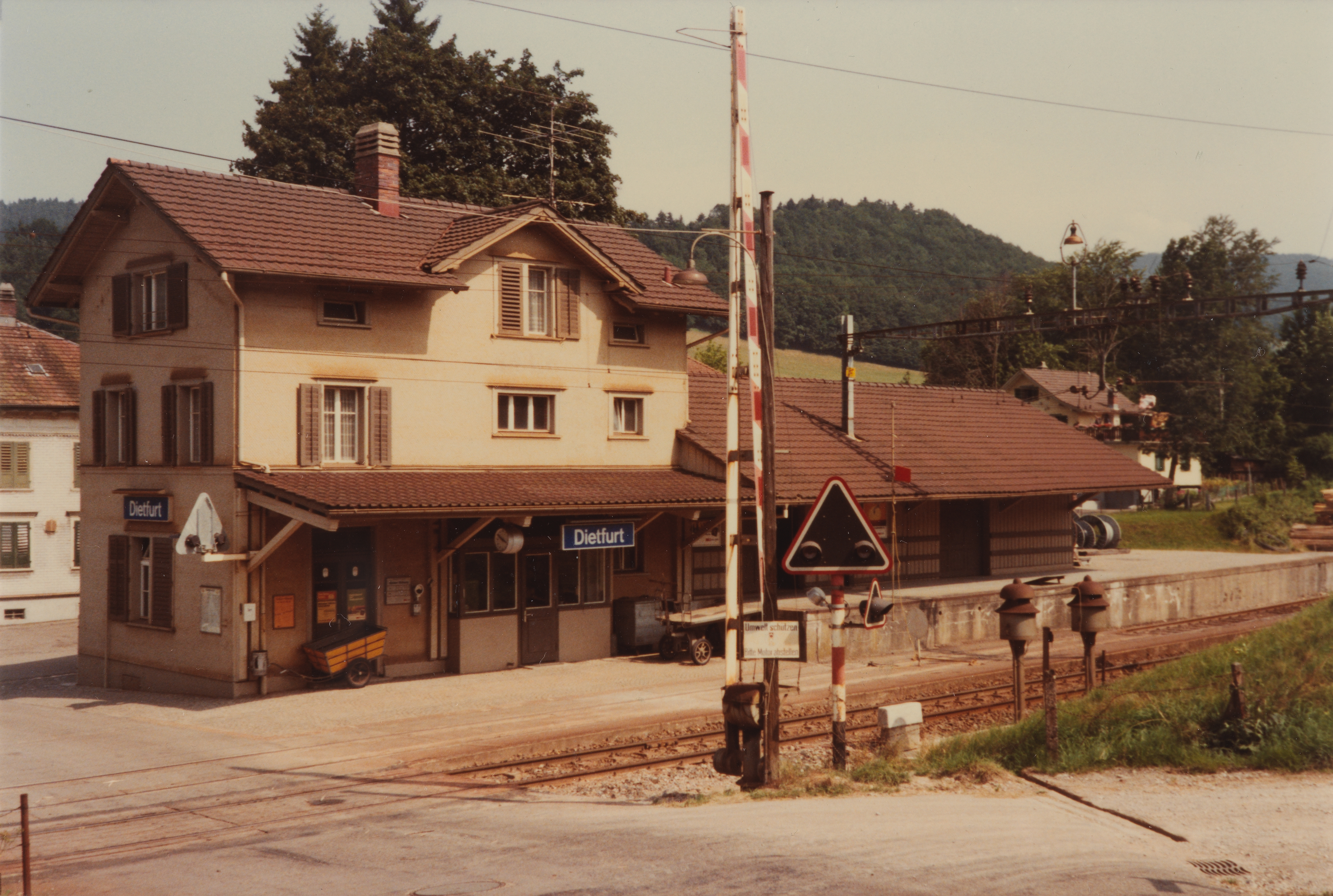
- The station in 1981

General information
- Location: Bütschwil-Ganterschwil; Switzerland
- Coordinates: 47°20′40.380″N 9°4′41.880″E
- Elevation: 611 m (2,005 ft)
- Owner: Swiss Federal Railways
- Line: Wil–Ebnat-Kappel line
- Platforms: 1 side platform
- Tracks: 1
- Train operators: Thurbo
- Connections
- Bus: PostAuto bus routes 771 772

Other information
- Fare zone: 975 (Tarifverbund Ostwind)

Services
Preceding station	St. Gallen S-Bahn	Following station
Lichtensteig towards Wattwil	S9	Bütschwil towards Wil
Location
- Location within Switzerland Location within Canton of St. Gallen

Dietfurt railway station (German: Bahnhof Dietfurt) is a railway station in Bütschwil-Ganterschwil, in the Swiss canton of St. Gallen. It is an intermediate stop on the Wil–Ebnat-Kappel line and is served by local trains only.

== Services ==
Dietfurt is served by the S9 of the St. Gallen S-Bahn:

- S9: half-hourly service between Wattwil and Wil SG.

== See also ==
- Rail transport in Switzerland
