= Bazenheid railway station =

Train station in Switzerland

Bazenheid
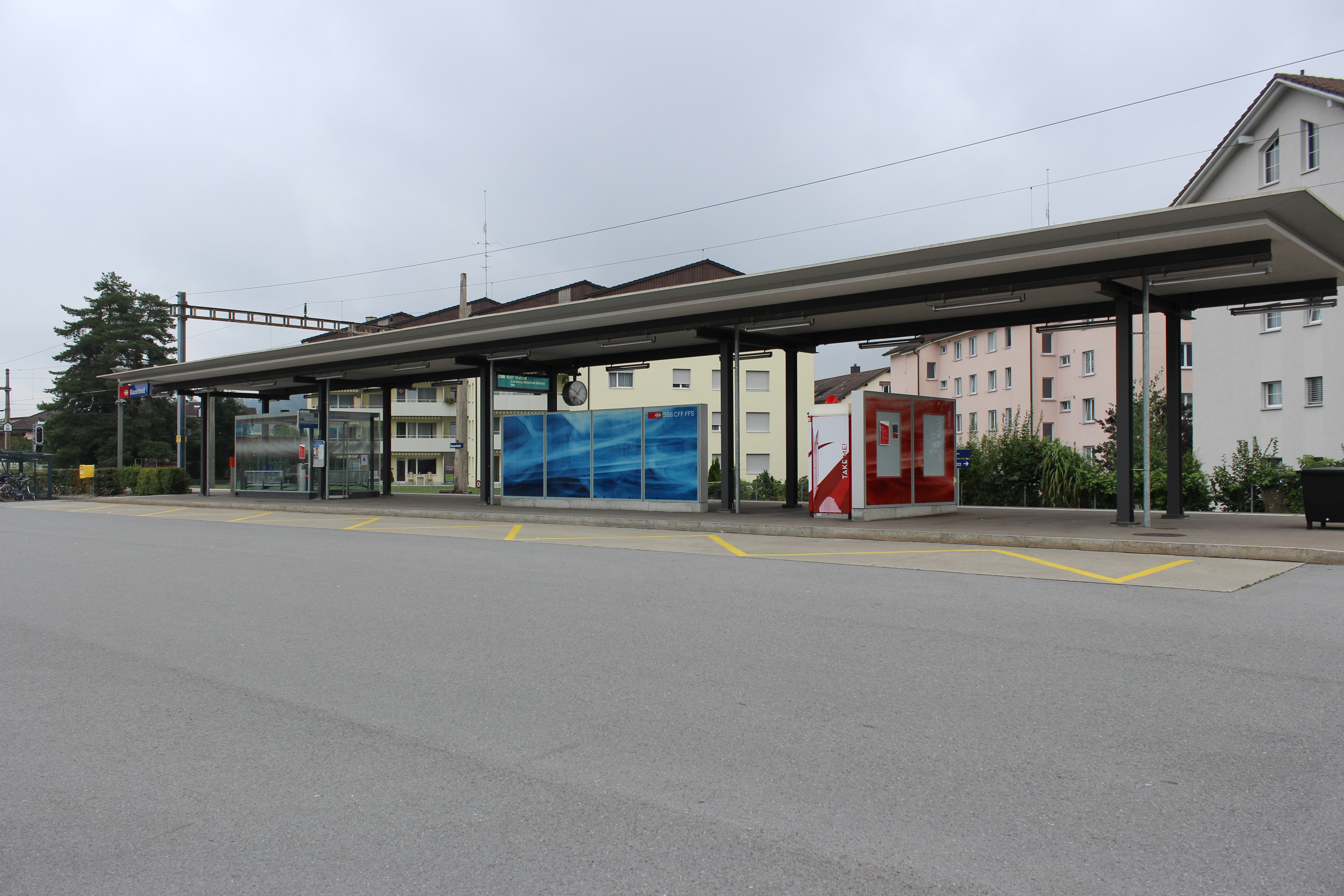
- The station platform in 2018

General information
- Location: Kirchberg; Switzerland
- Coordinates: 47°24′36.461″N 9°4′8.551″E
- Elevation: 598 m (1,962 ft)
- Owner: Swiss Federal Railways
- Line: Wil–Ebnat-Kappel line
- Platforms: 1 side platform
- Tracks: 2
- Train operators: Thurbo

Other information
- Fare zone: 915 (Tarifverbund Ostwind)

Services
Preceding station	St. Gallen S-Bahn	Following station
Lütisburg towards Wattwil	S9	Wil Terminus
Location
- Location within Switzerland Location within Canton of St. Gallen

Bazenheid railway station (German: Bahnhof Bazenheid) is a railway station in Kirchberg, in the Swiss canton of St. Gallen. It is an intermediate stop on the Wil–Ebnat-Kappel line and is served by local trains only.

== Services ==
=== Train ===
Bazenheid is served by the S9 of the St. Gallen S-Bahn:

- S9: half-hourly service between Wattwil and Wil SG.

=== Bus ===
The station is also served by a bus line of Bus Ostschweiz:

- 761: several times a day to Kirberg and Dietschwil.

== See also ==
- Rail transport in Switzerland
