= Lütisburg railway station =

Train station in Switzerland

Lütisburg
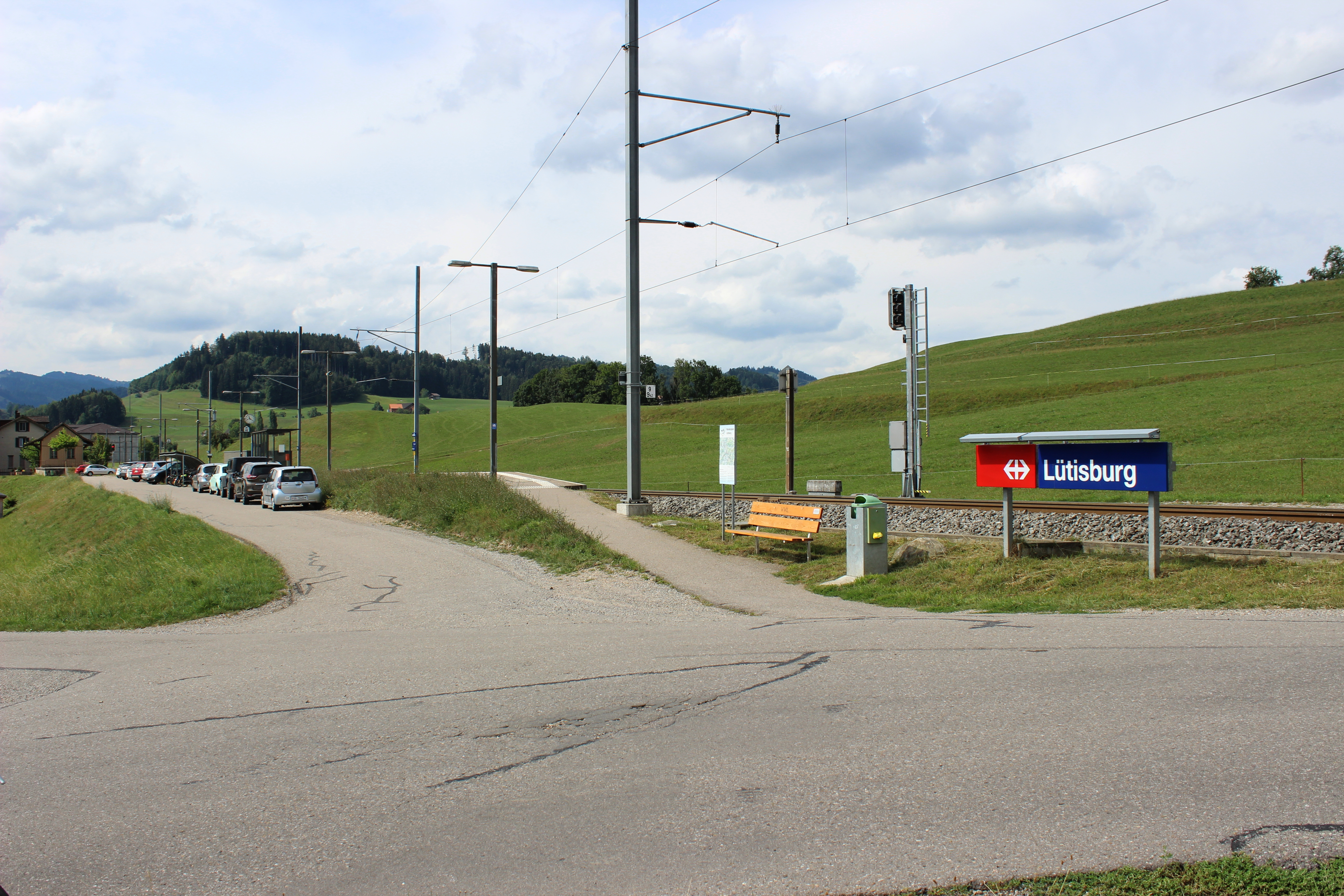
- The station platform in 2018; the shelter is in the distance

General information
- Location: Lütisburg; Switzerland
- Coordinates: 47°23′1.777″N 9°4′14.426″E
- Elevation: 599 m (1,965 ft)
- Owner: Swiss Federal Railways
- Line: Wil–Ebnat-Kappel line
- Platforms: 1 side platform
- Tracks: 1
- Train operators: Thurbo

Other information
- Fare zone: 975 (Tarifverbund Ostwind)

Services
Preceding station	St. Gallen S-Bahn	Following station
Bütschwil towards Wattwil	S9	Bazenheid towards Wil
Location
- Location within Switzerland Location within Canton of St. Gallen

Lütisburg railway station (German: Bahnhof Lütisburg) is a railway station in Lütisburg, in the Swiss canton of St. Gallen. It is an intermediate stop on the Wil–Ebnat-Kappel line and is served by local trains only.

== Services ==
Lütisburg is served by the S9 of the St. Gallen S-Bahn:

- S9: half-hourly service between Wattwil and Wil SG.

== See also ==
- Rail transport in Switzerland
