= Rimensberger =

Rimensberger (also spelled Rimensperger or Riemensberger) is a Swiss surname. It derives from Rimensberg, a hamlet in the municipality of Lütisburg in the canton of St. Gallen. The place name means roughly "hill belonging to a person named Rimîn".

Families of the name held citizenship in Kirchberg, Uzwil and Lütisburg before 1800. Records in the State Archives of Zürich include the name from 1707, among them the 1721 marriage of Jakob Rimensberger of Lütisburg.

== Notable people ==
- Emil Friedrich Rimensberger (1894–1962), Swiss journalist and social attaché
- Georg Rimensberger (1928–1998), Swiss artist
