= S9 (St. Gallen S-Bahn) =

Railway service in St. Gallen, Switzerland

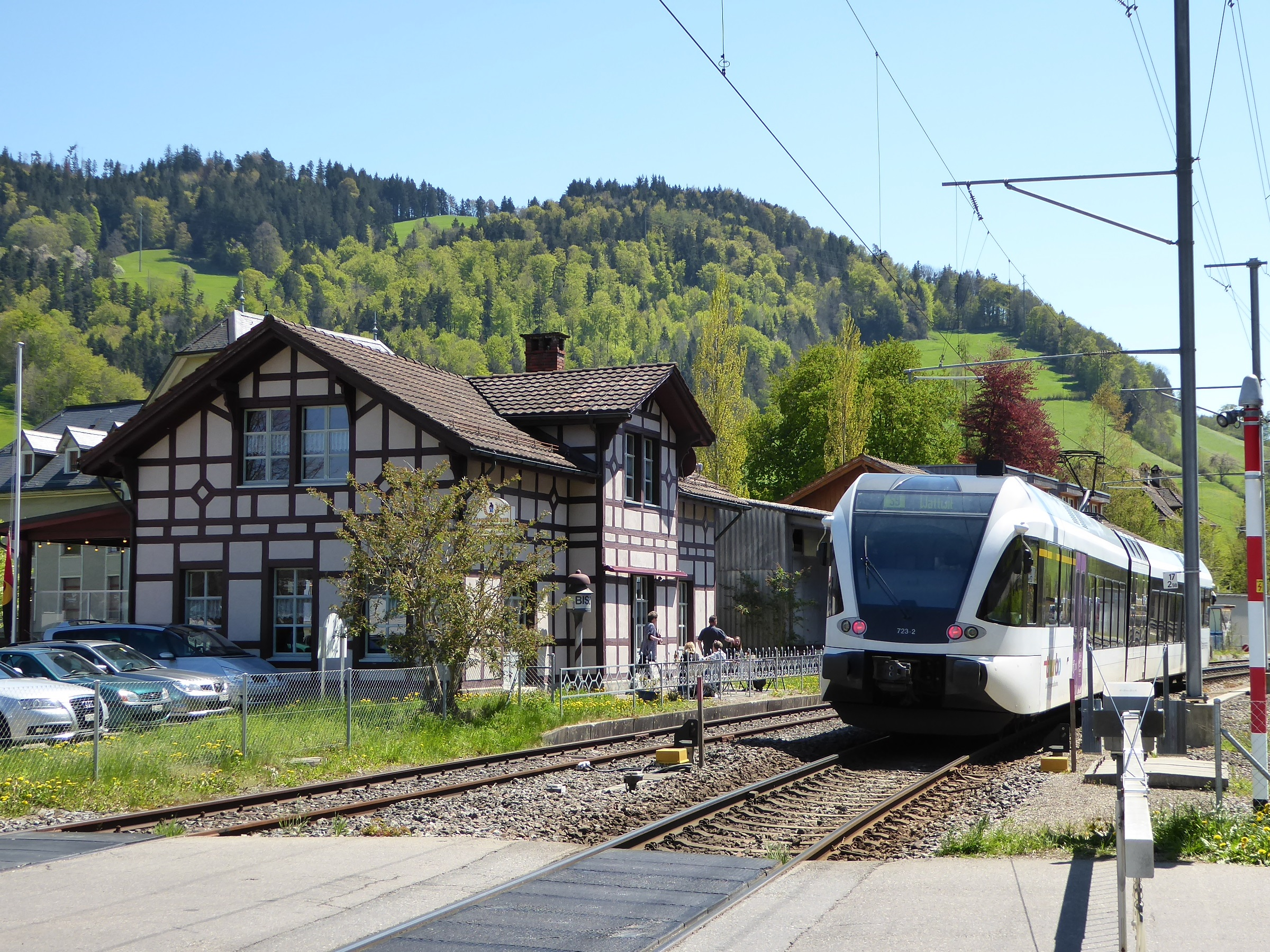
- A Wattwil-bound S9 passes Lichtensteig in 2016

Overview
- Current operator(s): THURBO

Route
- Termini: Wil; Wattwil
- Stops: 5
- Distance travelled: 20.0 kilometres (12.4 mi)
- Average journey time: 23 minutes
- Service frequency: Every 30 minutes
- Line(s) used: Wil–Ebnat-Kappel line

The S9 is a railway service of the St. Gallen S-Bahn that provides half-hourly service between Wil and Wattwil over the Wil–Ebnat-Kappel line. THURBO, a joint venture of Swiss Federal Railways and the canton of Thurgau, operates the service.

== Operations ==
The S9 operates every 30 minutes between Wil and Wattwil, using the Wil–Ebnat-Kappel line. It is the only service over that line between Wil and Lichtensteig.

== Route ==
The route follows the left bank of the River Thur through the lower Toggenburg Valley.

S9 Wil SG – Wattwil

- Wil SG
- Bazenheid
- Lütisburg
- Bütschwil
- Dietfurt
- Lichtensteig
- Wattwil

== History ==
Until the December 2013 timetable change, every other S9 service continued south to Nesslau-Neu St. Johann, providing hourly service to the remainder of the Wil–Ebnat-Kappel line and the short section of the Bodensee–Toggenburg line between Nesslau-Neu St. Johann and Ebnat-Kappel. With the timetable change, the S9 was cut back to its present terminus and the former S8 (which later merged with the former S1) extended to Nesslau-Neu St. Johann.
