= Ganterschwil =

- Former municipality
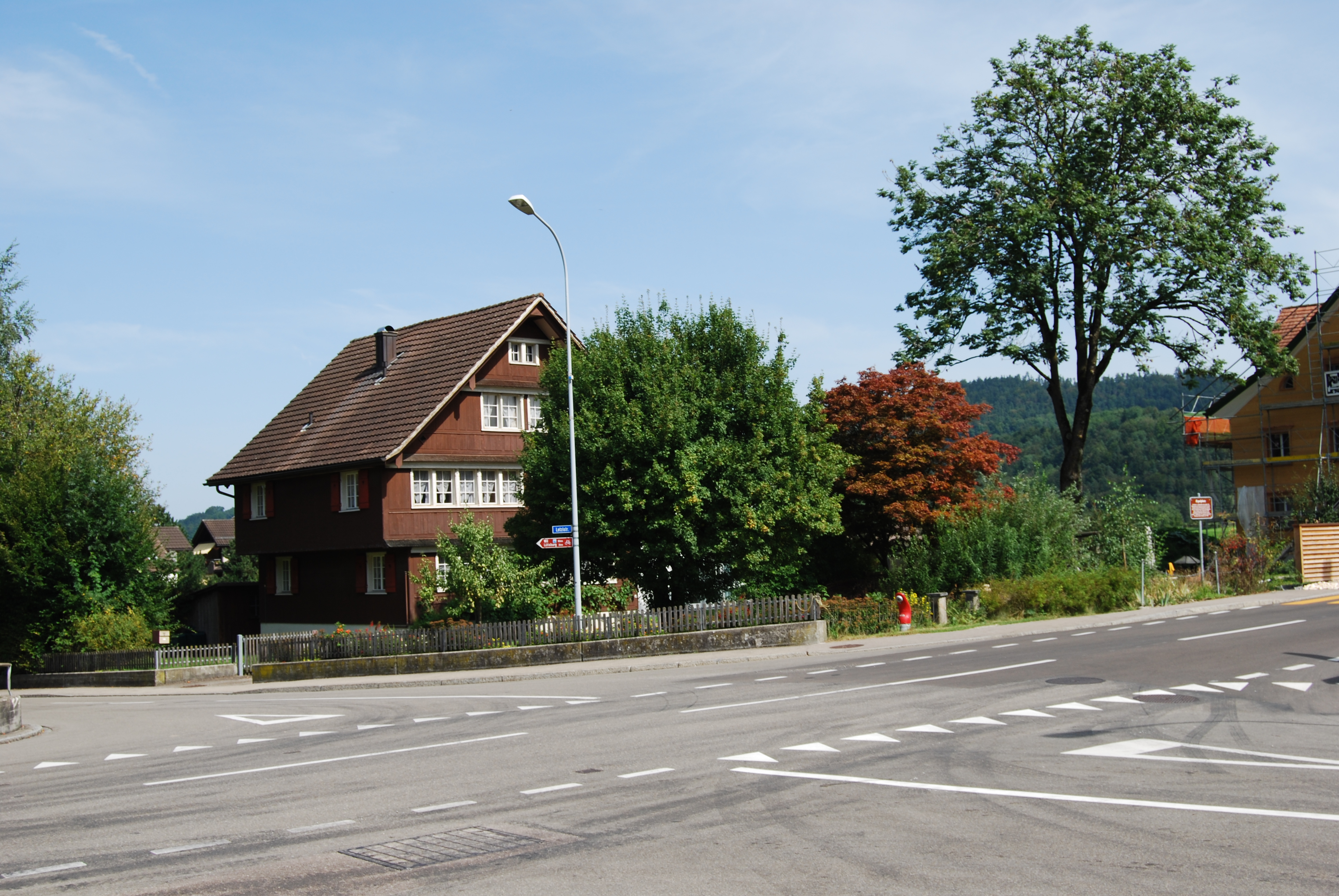

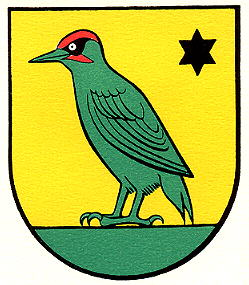
- Coat of arms
- Location of Ganterschwil
- Location within Switzerland Location within Canton of St. Gallen
- Coordinates: 47°23′N 9°5′E
- Country: Switzerland
- Canton: St. Gallen
- District: Toggenburg

Government
  - Mayor: Othmar Gerschwiler

Area
  - Total: 8.01 km^{2} (3.09 sq mi)
- Elevation: 606 m (1,988 ft)

Population (Dec 2011)
  - Total: 1,196
  - Density: 149/km^{2} (387/sq mi)
- Time zone: UTC+01:00 (CET)
  - Summer (DST): UTC+02:00 (CEST)
- Postal code: 9608
- SFOS number: 3403
- ISO 3166 code: CH-SG
- Surrounded by: Bütschwil, Lütisburg, Mogelsberg, Oberhelfenschwil
- Website: www.ganterschwil.ch

Ganterschwil is a former municipality in the Wahlkreis (constituency) of Toggenburg in the canton of St. Gallen in Switzerland. On 1 January 2013 the former municipalities of Bütschwil and Ganterschwil merged to form the new municipality of Bütschwil-Ganterschwil.

== History ==
Ganterschwil is first mentioned in 779 as Cantrichesuilare.

== Geography ==
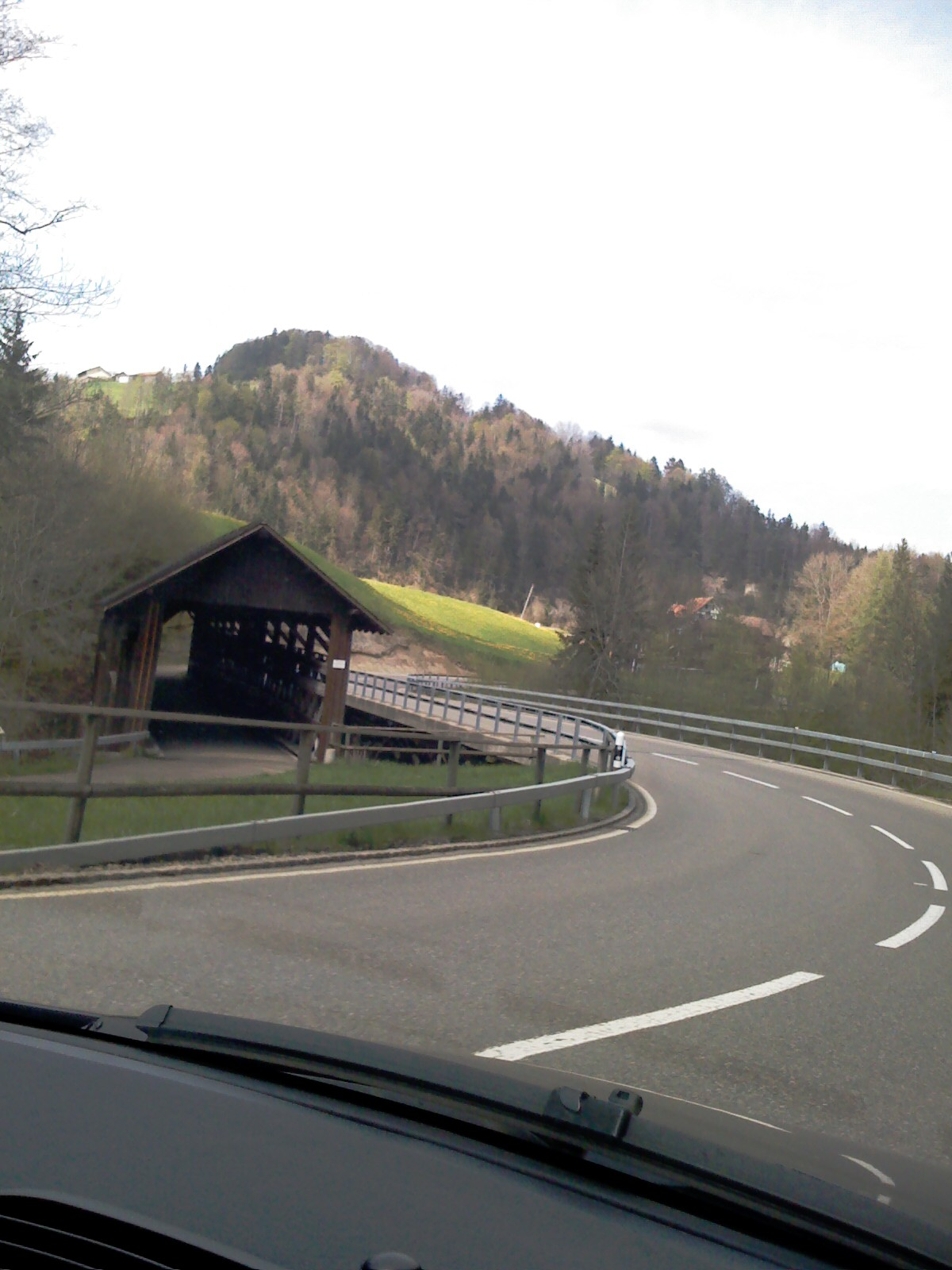
Wooden bridge between Mogelsberg and Ganterschwil

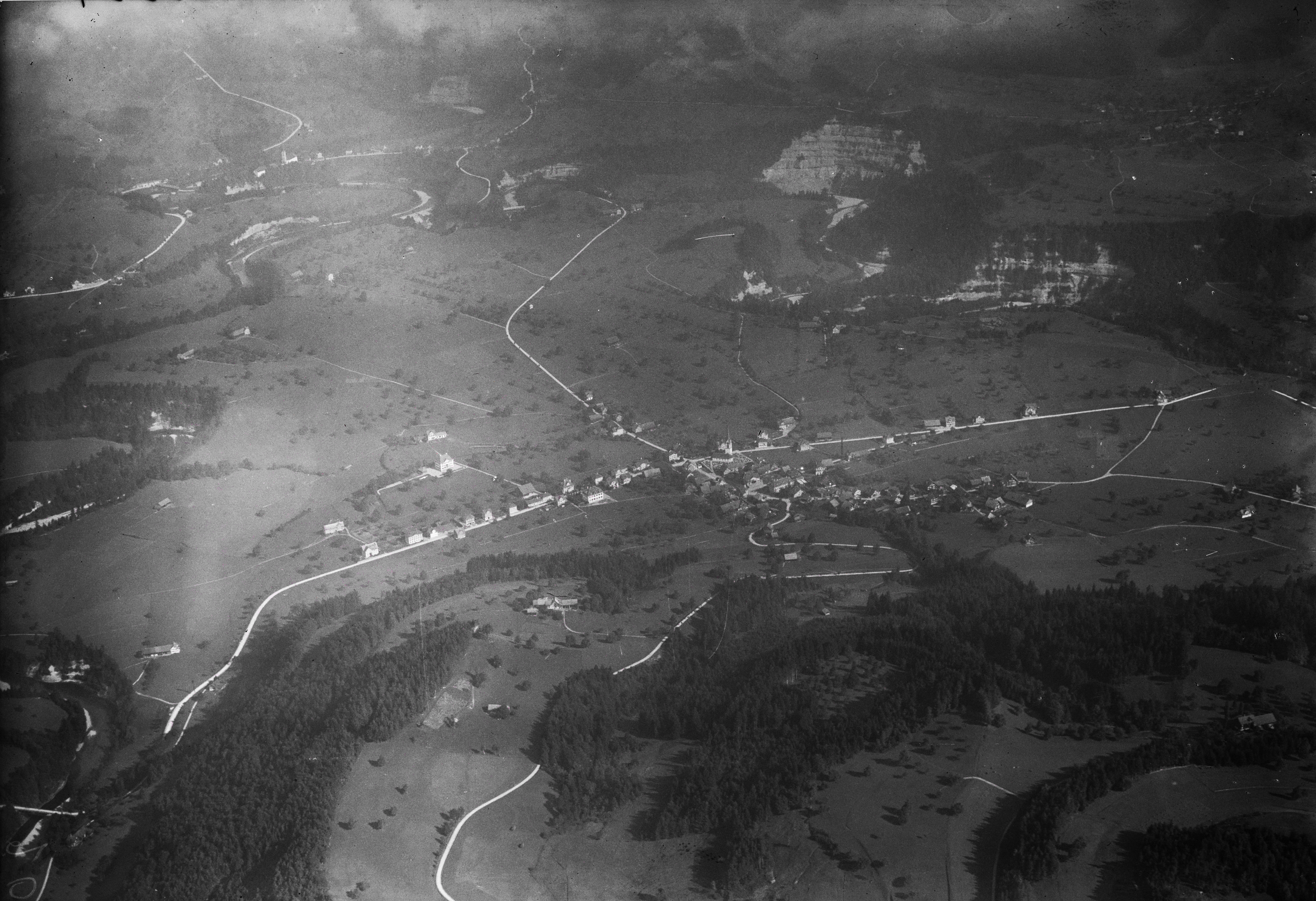
Aerial view by Walter Mittelholzer (1923)

Ganterschwil had an area, as of 2006, of 8.1 km^{2} (3.1 sq mi). Of this area, 63.8% is used for agricultural purposes, while 26.2% is forested. Of the rest of the land, 7% is settled (buildings or roads) and the remainder (3%) is non-productive (rivers or lakes).

The former municipality is located in the Toggenburg Wahlkreis in a high plateau between the Thur and Neckar rivers. It consists of the village of Ganterschwil and the hamlets of Äwil, Anzenwil, Bleiken, Ötschwil and Tobel as well as scattered individual farm houses.

== Coat of arms ==
The blazon of the municipal coat of arms is Or on a Base Vert a Woodpecker of the same and in chief sinister a Mullet Sable.

== Demographics ==
Ganterschwil had a population (as of 2011) of 1,196. As of 2007, about 7.5% of the population was made up of foreign nationals. Of the foreign population, (as of 2000), 7 are from Germany, 12 are from Italy, 30 are from ex-Yugoslavia, 5 are from Austria, 1 person is from Turkey, and 16 are from another country. Over the last 10 years the population has decreased at a rate of -2%. Most of the population (as of 2000) speaks German (96.2%), with Albanian being second most common ( 1.4%) and Italian being third ( 0.4%). Of the Swiss national languages (as of 2000), 1,069 speak German, 3 people speak French, 4 people speak Italian, and 4 people speak Romansh.

The age distribution, as of 2000, in Ganterschwil is; 175 children or 15.8% of the population are between 0 and 9 years old and 202 teenagers or 18.2% are between 10 and 19. Of the adult population, 114 people or 10.3% of the population are between 20 and 29 years old. 172 people or 15.5% are between 30 and 39, 172 people or 15.5% are between 40 and 49, and 103 people or 9.3% are between 50 and 59. The senior population distribution is 61 people or 5.5% of the population are between 60 and 69 years old, 79 people or 7.1% are between 70 and 79, there are 29 people or 2.6% who are between 80 and 89, and there are 4 people or 0.4% who are between 90 and 99.

In 2000 there were 112 persons (or 10.1% of the population) who were living alone in a private dwelling. There were 193 (or 17.4%) persons who were part of a couple (married or otherwise committed) without children, and 727 (or 65.4%) who were part of a couple with children. There were 48 (or 4.3%) people who lived in single parent home, while there are 10 persons who were adult children living with one or both parents, 5 persons who lived in a household made up of relatives, and 16 who are either institutionalized or live in another type of collective housing.

In the 2007 federal election the most popular party was the SVP which received 43.4% of the vote. The next three most popular parties were the FDP (20.7%), the CVP (18.1%) and the SP (8%).

The entire Swiss population is generally well educated. In Ganterschwil about 71.1% of the population (between age 25-64) have completed either non-mandatory upper secondary education or additional higher education (either university or a Fachhochschule). Out of the total population in Ganterschwil, as of 2000, the highest education level completed by 237 people (21.3% of the population) was Primary, while 380 (34.2%) have completed Secondary, 78 (7.0%) have attended a Tertiary school, and 51 (4.6%) are not in school. The remainder did not answer this question.

The historical population is given in the following table:

year	population
1800	681
1834	732
1900	868
1950	971
2000	1,111

== Economy ==
As of 2007, Ganterschwil had an unemployment rate of 1.23%. As of 2005, there were 85 people employed in the primary economic sector and about 38 businesses involved in this sector. 78 people are employed in the secondary sector and there are 20 businesses in this sector. 172 people are employed in the tertiary sector, with 23 businesses in this sector.

Of the companies with operations in Ganterschwil, Berlinger & Co. AG, a family-owned company with significant product lines of temperature monitoring technologies use by pharmaceutical, chemical, cosmetic, and other industries, and of standardised doping control systems used in testing animal and human fluids (urine, blood), has received attention for providing the sample collection kits and related items for the Sochi winter olympics.

As of October 2009 the average unemployment rate was 1.1%. There were 85 businesses in the municipality of which 21 were involved in the secondary sector of the economy while 29 were involved in the third. As of 2000 there were 212 residents who worked in the municipality, while 344 residents worked outside Ganterschwil and 156 people commuted into the municipality for work.

== Religion ==
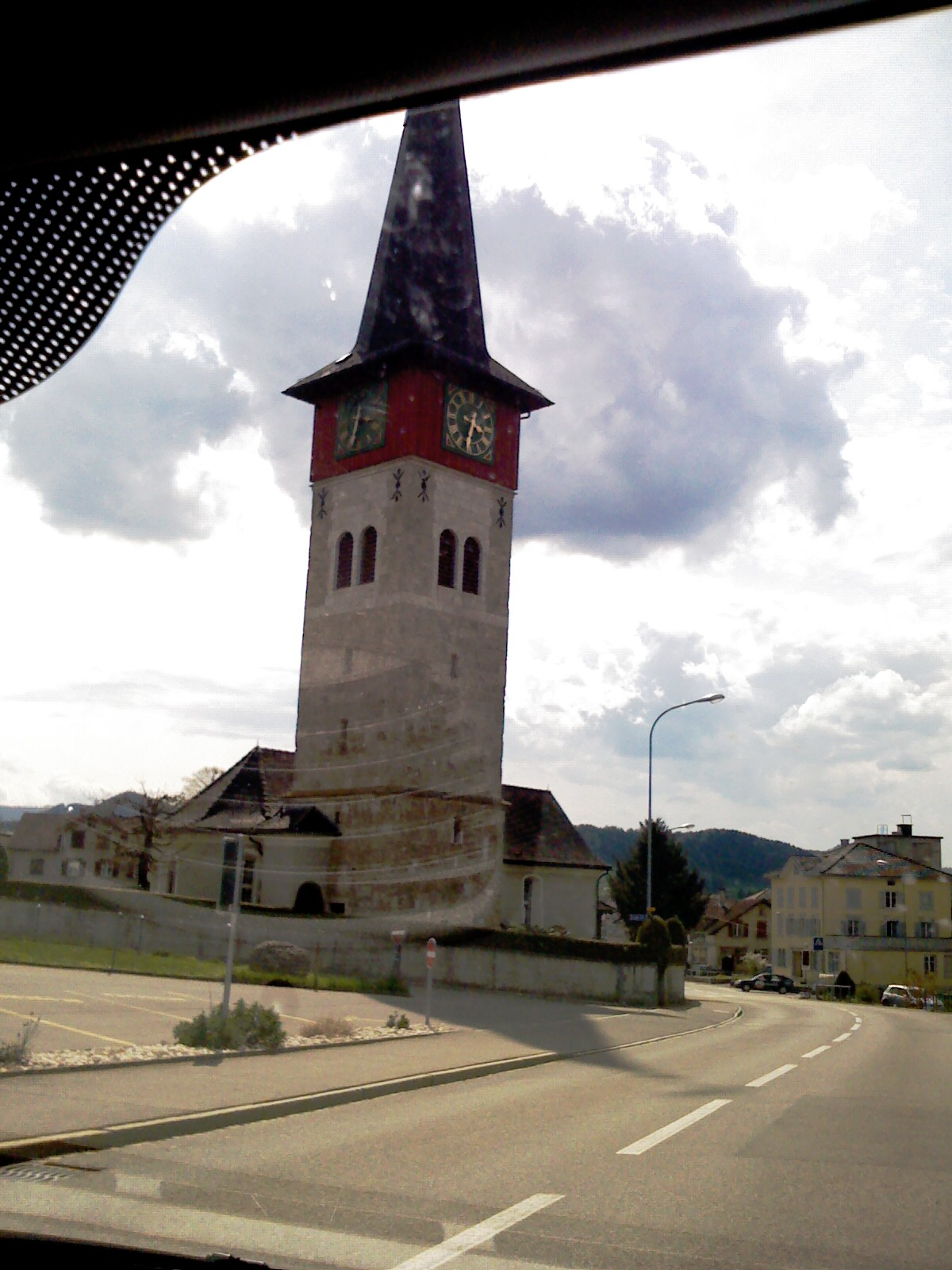
Village church of Ganterschwil

From the 2000 census, 603 or 54.3% are Roman Catholic, while 398 or 35.8% belonged to the Swiss Reformed Church. Of the rest of the population, there are 3 individuals (or about 0.27% of the population) who belong to the Christian Catholic faith, there are 3 individuals (or about 0.27% of the population) who belong to the Orthodox Church, and there are 11 individuals (or about 0.99% of the population) who belong to another Christian church. There are 19 (or about 1.71% of the population) who are Islamic. There are 1 individuals (or about 0.09% of the population) who belong to another church (not listed on the census), 37 (or about 3.33% of the population) belong to no church, are agnostic or atheist, and 36 individuals (or about 3.24% of the population) did not answer the question.
