= Arthur Wittwer =

Swiss long-distance runner

Personal information
- Nationality: Swiss
- Born: 15 November 1927 Kirchberg, Switzerland
- Died: 26 November 2008 (aged 81)

Sport
- Sport: Long-distance running
- Event: Marathon

Arthur Wittwer (15 November 1927 – 26 November 2008) was a Swiss long-distance runner. He competed in the marathon at the 1960 Summer Olympics.
