= Mühlrüti =

Coordinates: 47°22′15″N 8°59′6″E

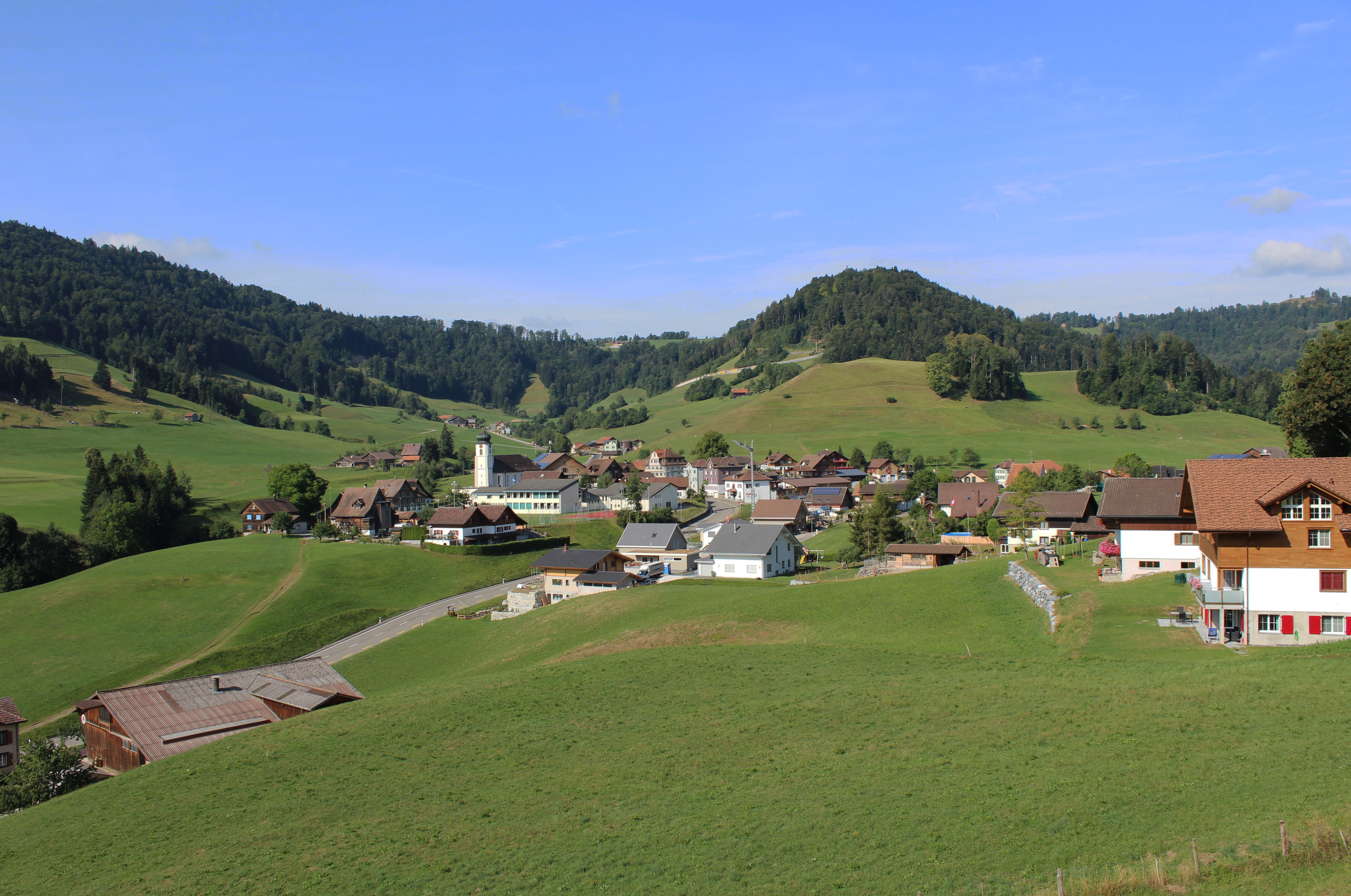
Mühlrüti

Aerial view (1955)

Mühlrüti is a small town in the Canton of St. Gallen in Switzerland. It is part of the municipality of Mosnang in Toggenburg, in hilly northeastern Switzerland. The population of about 400 people works mainly in the dairy farming industry.
