= Bütschwil =

- Former municipality
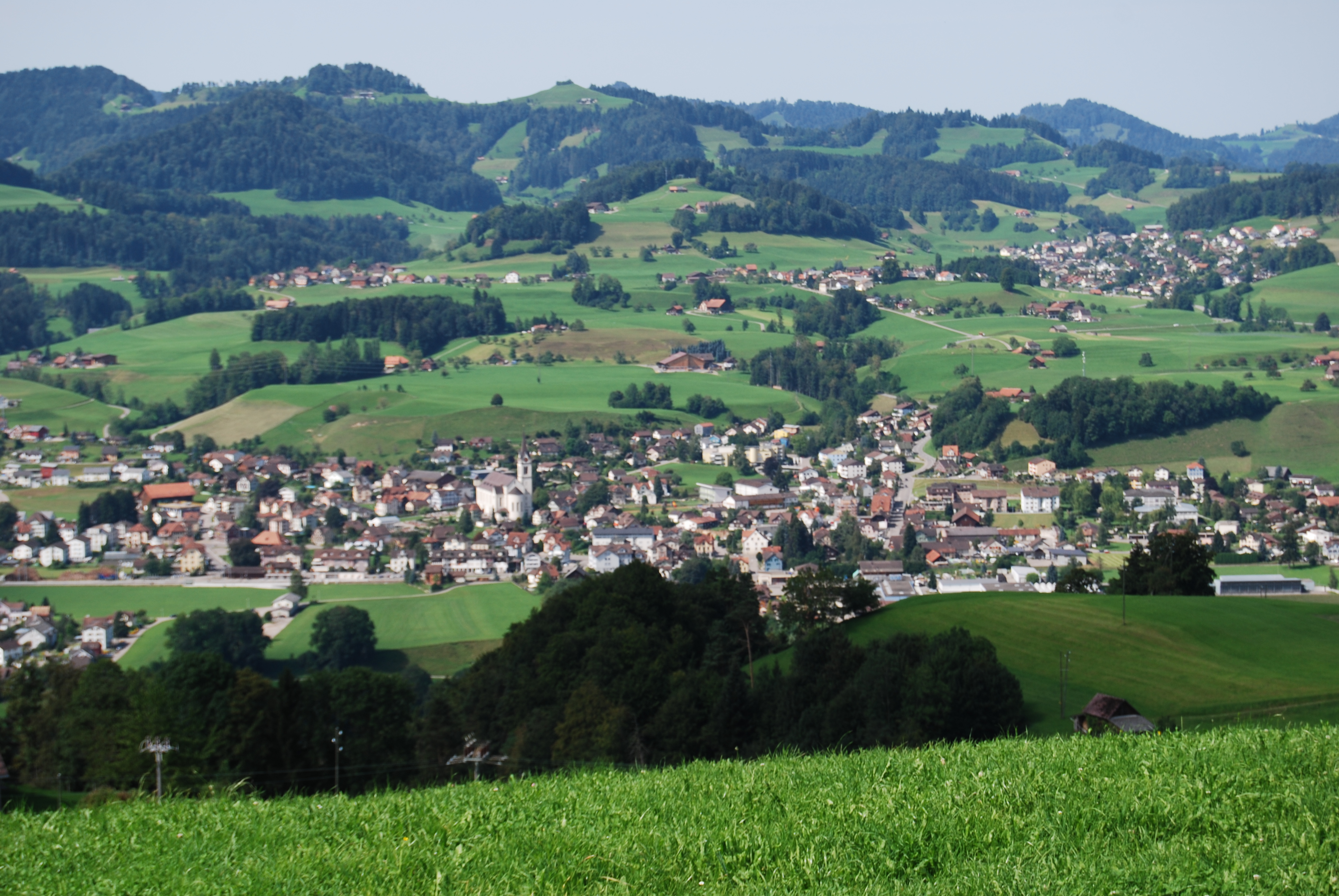

- Coat of arms
- Location of Bütschwil
- Location within Switzerland Location within Canton of St. Gallen
- Coordinates: 47°21′N 9°4′E
- Country: Switzerland
- Canton: St. Gallen
- District: Toggenburg

Government
  - Mayor: Karl Brändle

Area
  - Total: 13.79 km^{2} (5.32 sq mi)
- Elevation: 610 m (2,000 ft)
- Highest elevation (Sedelberg): 942 m (3,091 ft)
- Lowest elevation (Thur river): 555 m (1,821 ft)

Population (Dec 2011)
  - Total: 3,365
  - Density: 244.0/km^{2} (632.0/sq mi)
- Time zone: UTC+01:00 (CET)
  - Summer (DST): UTC+02:00 (CEST)
- Postal code: 9606
- SFOS number: 3391
- ISO 3166 code: CH-SG
- Surrounded by: Ganterschwil, Krinau, Lichtensteig, Lütisburg, Mosnang, Oberhelfenschwil, Wattwil
- Website: www.buetschwil.ch

Bütschwil is a former municipality in the Wahlkreis (constituency) of Toggenburg in the canton of St. Gallen in Switzerland. On 1 January 2013 the former municipalities of Bütschwil and Ganterschwil merged to form the new municipality of Bütschwil-Ganterschwil.

== History ==
Bütschwil is first mentioned in 779 as Bucinesvilare.

== Geography ==
Bütschwil had an area, as of 2006, of 13.7 km^{2} (5.3 sq mi). Of this area, 66.3% is used for agricultural purposes, while 19.8% is forested. Of the rest of the land, 12.4% is settled (buildings or roads) and the remainder (1.5%) is non-productive (rivers or lakes).

The former municipality is located in the Toggenburg Wahlkreis along the Thur river. On the left bank of the Thur, it consists of the linear villages of Bütschwil and Dietfurt and the hamlets of Grämigen, Tierhag, Feld, Kengelbach and Zwiselen. While on the right bank are the hamlets of Langensteig and Laufen.

== Coat of arms ==
The blazon of the municipal coat of arms is Gules, two Swans' Heads proper couped and interwoven.

== Demographics ==
Bütschwil had a population (as of 2011) of 3,365. As of 2007, about 15.7% of the population was made up of foreign nationals. Of the foreign population, (as of 2000), 28 are from Germany, 83 are from Italy, 318 are from ex-Yugoslavia, 5 are from Austria, 165 are from Turkey, and 65 are from another country. Over the last 10 years the population has decreased at a rate of -7.2%. Most of the population (as of 2000) speaks German (88.2%), with Albanian being second most common ( 3.6%) and Serbo-Croatian being third ( 1.8%). Of the Swiss national languages (as of 2000), 3,131 speak German, 5 people speak French, 62 people speak Italian, and 2 people speak Romansh.

The age distribution, as of 2000, in Bütschwil is; 482 children or 13.6% of the population are between 0 and 9 years old and 605 teenagers or 17.0% are between 10 and 19. Of the adult population, 411 people or 11.6% of the population are between 20 and 29 years old. 523 people or 14.7% are between 30 and 39, 454 people or 12.8% are between 40 and 49, and 341 people or 9.6% are between 50 and 59. The senior population distribution is 292 people or 8.2% of the population are between 60 and 69 years old, 245 people or 6.9% are between 70 and 79, there are 156 people or 4.4% who are between 80 and 89, and there are 41 people or 1.2% who are between 90 and 99.

In 2000 there were 337 persons (or 9.5% of the population) who were living alone in a private dwelling. There were 621 (or 17.5%) persons who were part of a couple (married or otherwise committed) without children, and 2,244 (or 63.2%) who were part of a couple with children. There were 149 (or 4.2%) people who lived in single parent home, while there are 33 persons who were adult children living with one or both parents, 18 persons who lived in a household made up of relatives, 8 who lived household made up of unrelated persons, and 140 who are either institutionalized or live in another type of collective housing.

In the 2007 federal election the most popular party was the SVP which received 36.5% of the vote. The next three most popular parties were the CVP (35.2%), the FDP (9.6%) and the SP (7.1%).

The entire Swiss population is generally well educated. In Bütschwil about 62% of the population (between age 25-64) have completed either non-mandatory upper secondary education or additional higher education (either University or a Fachhochschule). Out of the total population in Bütschwil, as of 2000, the highest education level completed by 925 people (26.1% of the population) was Primary, while 1,104 (31.1%) have completed Secondary, 238 (6.7%) have attended a Tertiary school, and 199 (5.6%) are not in school. The remainder did not answer this question.

The historical population is given in the following table:

| year | population |
|---|---|
| 1827 | 1,750 |
| 1850 | 1,961 |
| 1900 | 2,869 |
| 1910 | 3,149 |
| 1950 | 3,379 |
| 1990 | 3,632 |
| 2000 | 3,550 |

== Sights ==
The village of Bütschwil is designated as part of the Inventory of Swiss Heritage Sites.

== Economy ==
As of 2007, Bütschwil had an unemployment rate of 1.14%. As of 2005, there were 209 people employed in the primary economic sector and about 89 businesses involved in this sector. 573 people are employed in the secondary sector and there are 60 businesses in this sector. 705 people are employed in the tertiary sector, with 112 businesses in this sector.

As of October 2009 the average unemployment rate was 2.8%. There were 262 businesses in the municipality of which 64 were involved in the secondary sector of the economy while 117 were involved in the third.

As of 2000 there were 767 residents who worked in the municipality, while 931 residents worked outside Bütschwil and 544 people commuted into the municipality for work.

== Religion ==
From the 2000 census, 2,404 or 67.7% are Roman Catholic, while 471 or 13.3% belonged to the Swiss Reformed Church. Of the rest of the population, there are 105 individuals (or about 2.96% of the population) who belong to the Orthodox Church, and there are 66 individuals (or about 1.86% of the population) who belong to another Christian church. There is 1 individual who is Jewish, and 286 (or about 8.06% of the population) who are Islamic. There are 19 individuals (or about 0.54% of the population) who belong to another church (not listed on the census), 97 (or about 2.73% of the population) belong to no church, are agnostic or atheist, and 101 individuals (or about 2.85% of the population) did not answer the question.
