= Mosnang =

- Municipality
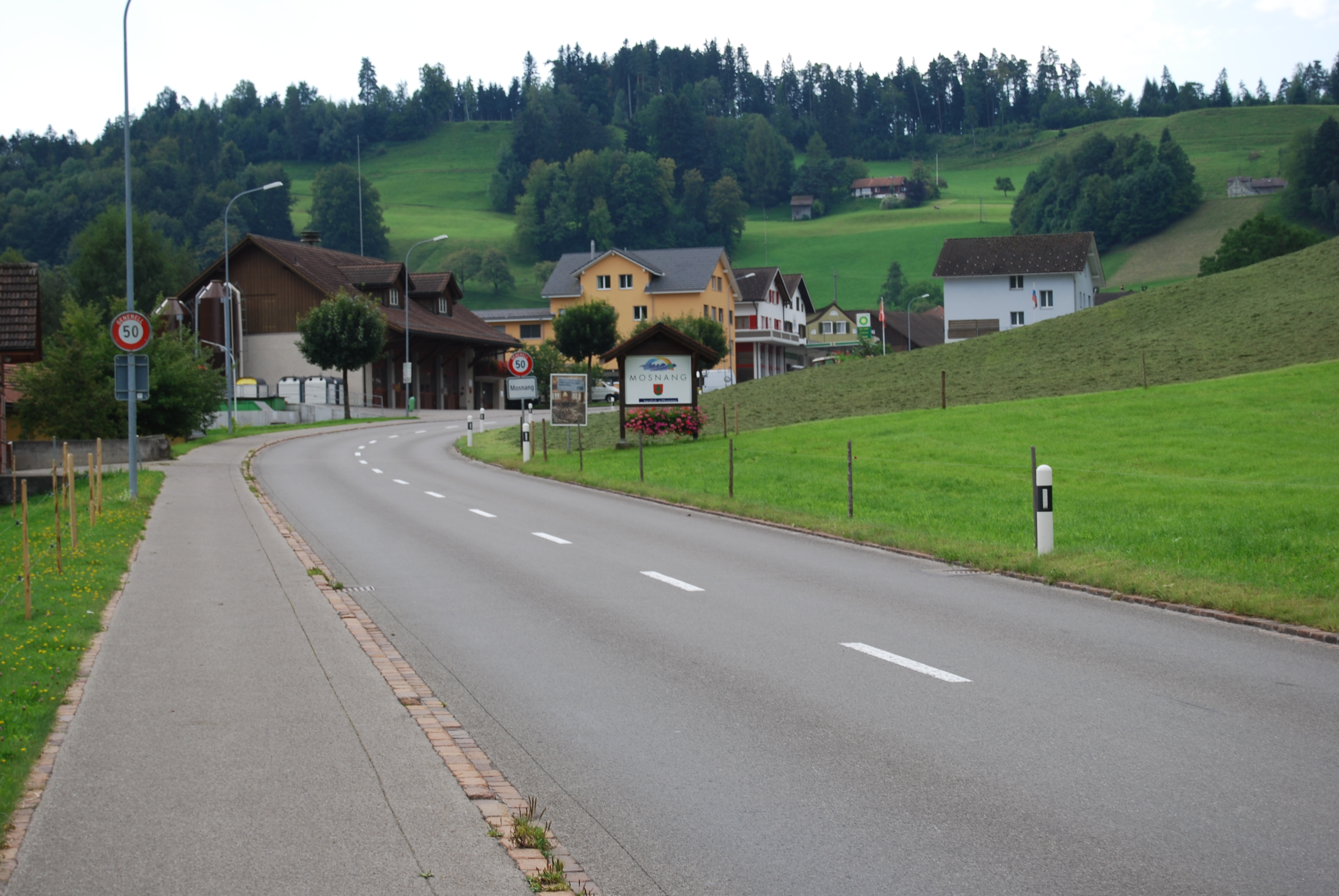

- Coat of arms
- Location of Mosnang
- Location within Switzerland Location within Canton of St. Gallen
- Coordinates: 47°21′N 9°2′E
- Country: Switzerland
- Canton: St. Gallen
- District: Toggenburg

Government
  - Mayor: Bernhard Graf

Area
  - Total: 50.46 km^{2} (19.48 sq mi)
- Elevation: 735 m (2,411 ft)

Population (December 2020)
  - Total: 2,889
  - Density: 57.25/km^{2} (148.3/sq mi)
- Time zone: UTC+01:00 (CET)
  - Summer (DST): UTC+02:00 (CEST)
- Postal code: 9607
- SFOS number: 3394
- ISO 3166 code: CH-SG
- Surrounded by: Bütschwil, Fischenthal (ZH), Fischingen (TG), Goldingen, Kirchberg, Krinau, Lütisburg, Sankt Gallenkappel, Sternenberg (ZH), Wattwil
- Website: www.mosnang.ch

Mosnang is a village and municipality in the constituency (Wahlkreis) of Toggenburg in the Swiss canton of St. Gallen.

== History ==
Mosnang is first mentioned in 854 as Masinang.

== Geography ==
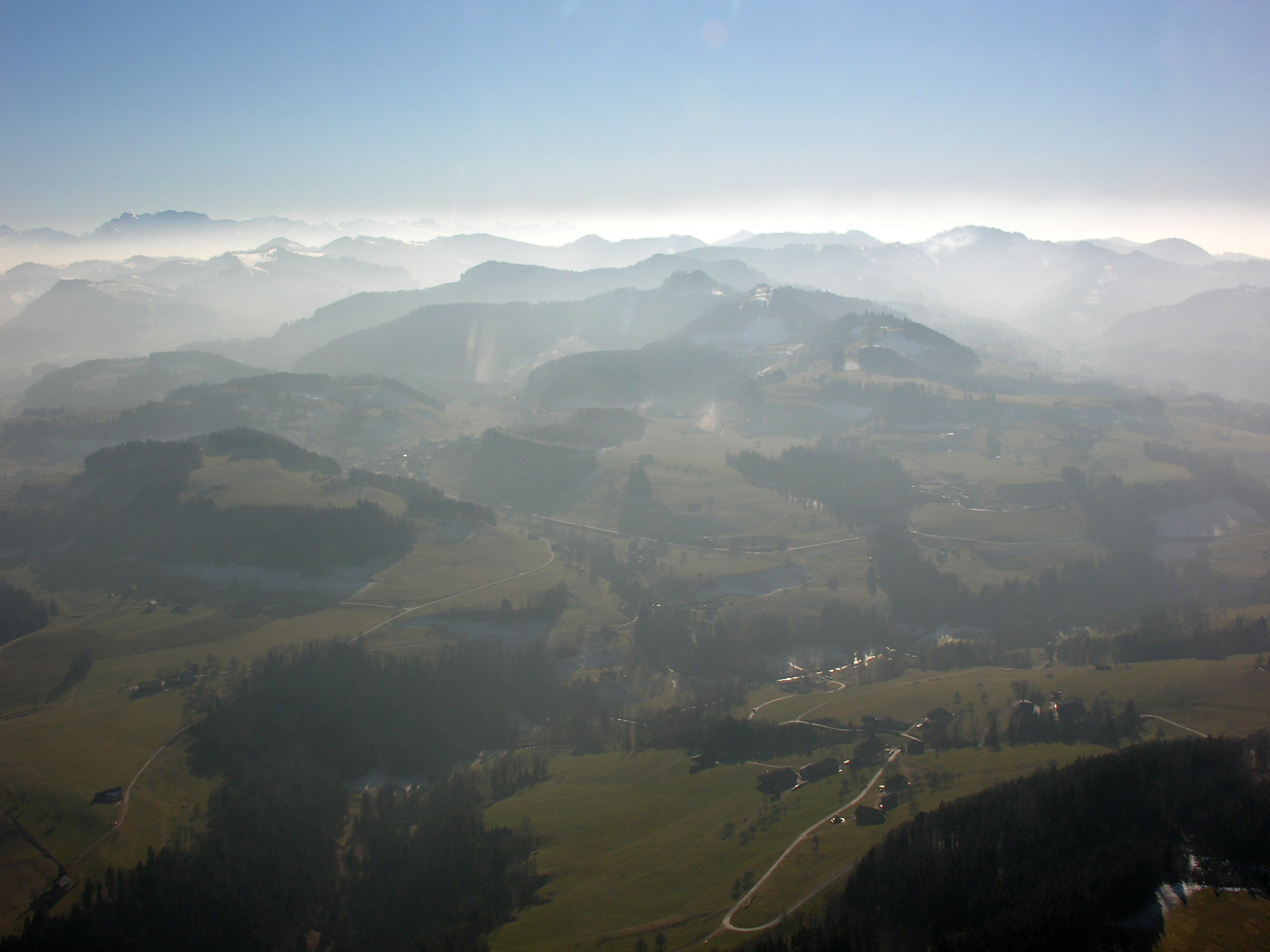
Aerial view over Mosnang

Aerial view (1955)

Mosnang has an area, as of 2006, of 50.6 km^{2} (19.5 sq mi). Of this area, 47.3% is used for agricultural purposes, while 48.8% is forested. Of the rest of the land, 3.8% is settled (buildings or roads) and the remainder (0.2%) is non-productive (rivers or lakes).

The municipality is located in the Toggenburg Wahlkreis. It consists of the villages of Mosnang, Mühlrüti and Libingen as well as the hamlets of Dreien and Wiesen. The municipality also includes Hulftegg Pass.

== Coat of arms ==
The blazon of the municipal coat of arms is Gules a Pine Tree Vert issuant from Coupeaux of the same.

== Demographics ==
Mosnang has a population (as of 31 December 2020) of 2,889. As of 2007, about 2.3% of the population was made up of foreign nationals. Of the foreign population, (as of 2000), 8 are from Germany, 6 are from Italy, 10 are from ex-Yugoslavia, 5 are from Austria, 12 are from Turkey, and 12 are from another country. Over the last 10 years the population has grown at a rate of 0.7%. Most of the population (as of 2000) speaks German (98.4%), with English being second most common ( 0.2%) and Serbo-Croatian being third ( 0.2%). Of the Swiss national languages (as of 2000), 2,847 speak German, 4 people speak French, 4 people speak Italian, and 3 people speak Romansh.

The age distribution, as of 2000, in Mosnang is; 475 children or 16.4% of the population are between 0 and 9 years old and 548 teenagers or 18.9% are between 10 and 19. Of the adult population, 298 people or 10.3% of the population are between 20 and 29 years old. 450 people or 15.5% are between 30 and 39, 375 people or 13.0% are between 40 and 49, and 258 people or 8.9% are between 50 and 59. The senior population distribution is 236 people or 8.2% of the population are between 60 and 69 years old, 162 people or 5.6% are between 70 and 79, there are 79 people or 2.7% who are between 80 and 89, and there are 13 people or 0.4% who are between 90 and 99.

In 2000 there were 221 persons (or 7.6% of the population) who were living alone in a private dwelling. There were 429 (or 14.8%) persons who were part of a couple (married or otherwise committed) without children, and 2,036 (or 70.4%) who were part of a couple with children. There were 103 (or 3.6%) people who lived in single parent home, while there are 12 persons who were adult children living with one or both parents, 19 persons who lived in a household made up of relatives, 6 who lived household made up of unrelated persons, and 68 who are either institutionalized or live in another type of collective housing.

In the 2007 federal election the most popular party was the CVP which received 43.3% of the vote. The next three most popular parties were the SVP (37%), the FDP (6.6%) and the Green Party (4.7%).

In Mosnang about 67.2% of the population (between age 25-64) have completed either non-mandatory upper secondary education or additional higher education (either university or a Fachhochschule). Out of the total population in Mosnang, as of 2000, the highest education level completed by 695 people (24.0% of the population) was Primary, while 921 (31.8%) have completed their secondary education, 189 (6.5%) have attended a Tertiary school, and 138 (4.8%) are not in school. The remainder did not answer this question.

The historical population is given in the following table:

year	population
1827	1,924
1850	3,005
1900	2,670
1950	2,638
2000	2,894

== Economy ==
As of 2007, Mosnang had an unemployment rate of 0.7%. As of 2005, there were 400 people employed in the primary economic sector and about 173 businesses involved in this sector. 218 people are employed in the secondary sector and there are 39 businesses in this sector. 329 people are employed in the tertiary sector, with 70 businesses in this sector.

As of October 2009 the average unemployment rate was 1.2%. There were 272 businesses in the municipality of which 42 were involved in the secondary sector of the economy while 65 were involved in the third.

As of 2000 there were 691 residents who worked in the municipality, while 697 residents worked outside Mosnang and 138 people commuted into the municipality for work.

== Religion ==
From the 2000 census, 2,400 or 82.9% are Roman Catholic, while 273 or 9.4% belonged to the Swiss Reformed Church. Of the rest of the population, there is 1 individual who belongs to the Christian Catholic faith, there are 8 individuals (or about 0.28% of the population) who belong to the Orthodox Church, and there are 14 individuals (or about 0.48% of the population) who belong to another Christian church. There is 1 individual who is Jewish, and 17 (or about 0.59% of the population) who are Islamic. There are 2 individuals (or about 0.07% of the population) who belong to another church (not listed on the census), 83 (or about 2.87% of the population) belong to no church, are agnostic or atheist, and 95 individuals (or about 3.28% of the population) did not answer the question.

== Notable people ==
- Ivo Rüthemann, ice hockey player for SC Bern
- Maria Walliser, alpine skier, world champion 1987 and 1989 in downhill and in 1987 in super-G, born 1963
