= Lütisburg =

- Municipality
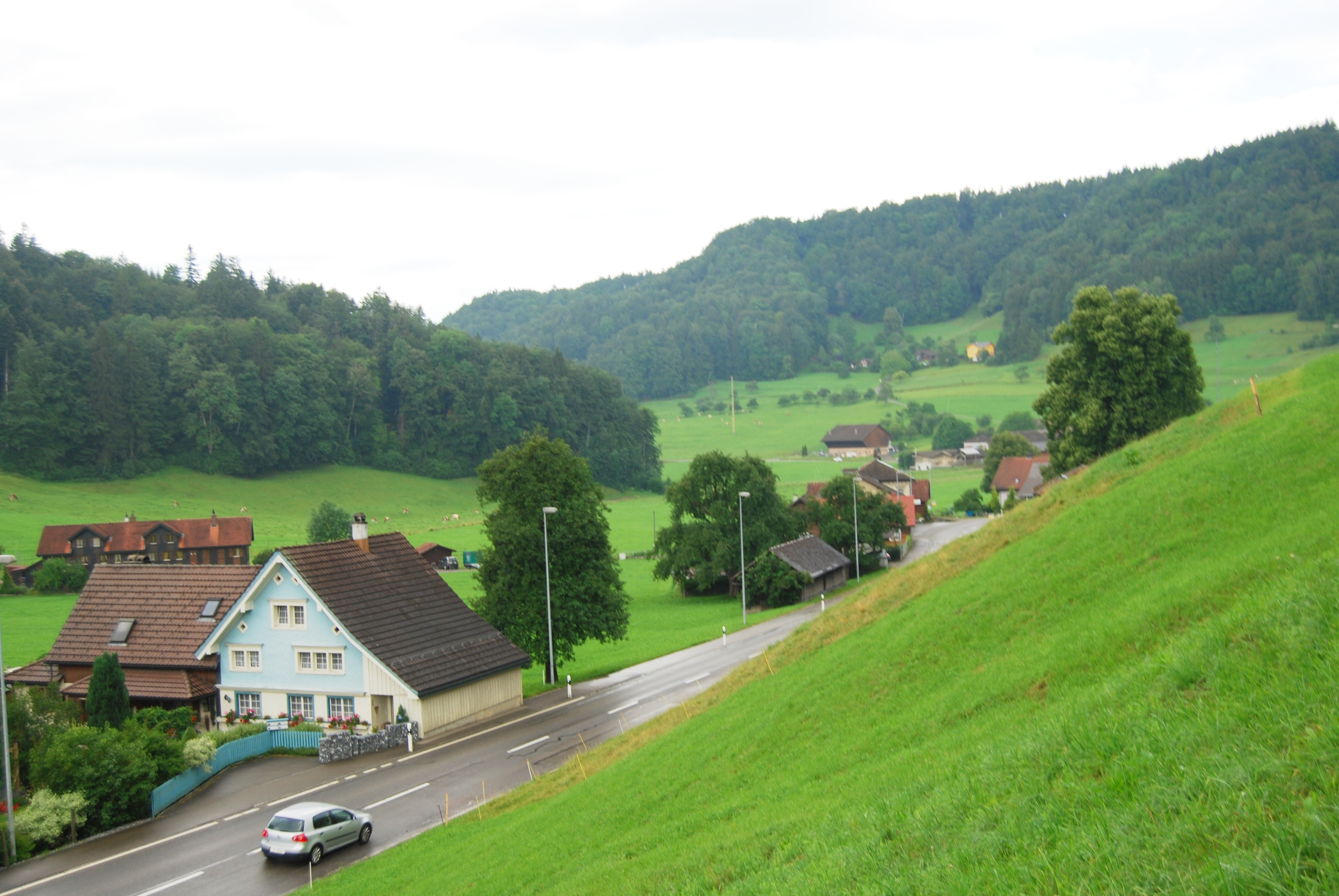

- Coat of arms
- Location of Lütisburg
- Location within Switzerland Location within Canton of St. Gallen
- Coordinates: 47°24′N 9°5′E
- Country: Switzerland
- Canton: St. Gallen
- District: Toggenburg

Government
  - Mayor: Hans-Peter Eisenring

Area
  - Total: 14.09 km^{2} (5.44 sq mi)
- Elevation: 580 m (1,900 ft)

Population (December 2020)
  - Total: 1,614
  - Density: 114.5/km^{2} (296.7/sq mi)
- Time zone: UTC+01:00 (CET)
  - Summer (DST): UTC+02:00 (CEST)
- Postal code: 9604
- SFOS number: 3393
- ISO 3166 code: CH-SG
- Surrounded by: Bütschwil, Degersheim, Ganterschwil, Jonschwil, Kirchberg, Neckertal, Mosnang, Oberuzwil
- Website: www.luetisburg.ch

Lütisburg is a municipality in the Wahlkreis (constituency) of Toggenburg in the canton of St. Gallen in Switzerland.

== History ==
Lütisburg is first mentioned in 1214 as Liutinsburch Bereits früher belegt sind. The hamlet of Rindal was first mentioned in 849 as Runtal, Tufertschwil was mentioned in 928 as Turolveswilare and Alenschwanden was mentioned in 928 as Waleessvanton.

== Geography ==
Aerial view (1949)

Lütisburg has an area, as of 2006, of 14 km^{2} (5.4 sq mi). Of this area, 58.4% is used for agricultural purposes, while 34.4% is forested. Of the rest of the land, 5.2% is settled (buildings or roads) and the remainder (2.1%) is non-productive (rivers or lakes).

The municipality is located in the Toggenburg Wahlkreis on a rocky ridge above the confluence of the Thur and Neckar rivers. It consists of the village of Lütisburg on the ridge above the rivers, the hamlet of Tufertschwil below a large molasse cliff and in the hill country around the rivers, the hamlets of Ober- and Unterrindal, Winzenberg, Rimensberg, Grünhügel, Gonzenbach, Schauenberg, Haslen, Dottenwil, Altegg, Wildenhof, Herrensberg and Chrummentürli.

== Coat of arms ==
The blazon of the municipal coat of arms is Or a Castle Sable with a Guard standing in front of the entrance.

== Demographics ==
Lütisburg has a population (as of 31 December 2020) of 1,614. As of 2007, about 8.2% of the population was made up of foreign nationals. Of the foreign population, (as of 2000), 13 are from Germany, 9 are from Italy, 72 are from ex-Yugoslavia, 3 are from Austria, 7 are from Turkey, and 32 are from another country. Over the last 10 years the population has decreased at a rate of -1.9%. Most of the population (as of 2000) speaks German (93.8%), with Albanian being second most common ( 2.2%) and Serbo-Croatian being third ( 1.3%). Of the Swiss national languages (as of 2000), 1,309 speak German, 7 people speak Italian, and 4 people speak Romansh.

The age distribution, as of 2000, in Lütisburg is; 225 children or 16.1% of the population are between 0 and 9 years old and 273 teenagers or 19.6% are between 10 and 19. Of the adult population, 147 people or 10.5% of the population are between 20 and 29 years old. 239 people or 17.1% are between 30 and 39, 202 people or 14.5% are between 40 and 49, and 123 people or 8.8% are between 50 and 59. The senior population distribution is 87 people or 6.2% of the population are between 60 and 69 years old, 80 people or 5.7% are between 70 and 79, there are 15 people or 1.1% who are between 80 and 89, and there are 4 people or 0.3% who are between 90 and 99.

In 2000 there were 111 persons (or 8.0% of the population) who were living alone in a private dwelling. There were 252 (or 18.1%) persons who were part of a couple (married or otherwise committed) without children, and 865 (or 62.0%) who were part of a couple with children. There were 60 (or 4.3%) people who lived in single parent home, while there are 7 persons who were adult children living with one or both parents, 4 persons who lived in a household made up of relatives, 8 who lived household made up of unrelated persons, and 88 who are either institutionalized or live in another type of collective housing.

In the 2007 federal election the most popular party was the SVP which received 40.1% of the vote. The next three most popular parties were the CVP (25.2%), the FDP (14.2%) and the SP (7.2%).

The entire Swiss population is generally well educated. In Lütisburg about 67.6% of the population (between age 25-64) have completed either non-mandatory upper secondary education or additional higher education (either university or a Fachhochschule). Out of the total population in Lütisburg, as of 2000, the highest education level completed by 280 people (20.1% of the population) was Primary, while 458 (32.8%) have completed their secondary education, 102 (7.3%) have attended a Tertiary school, and 70 (5.0%) are not in school. The remainder did not answer this question.

The historical population is given in the following table:

year	population
1803	1,070
1850	1,285
1900	1,270
1950	1,372
2000	1,395

== Religion ==
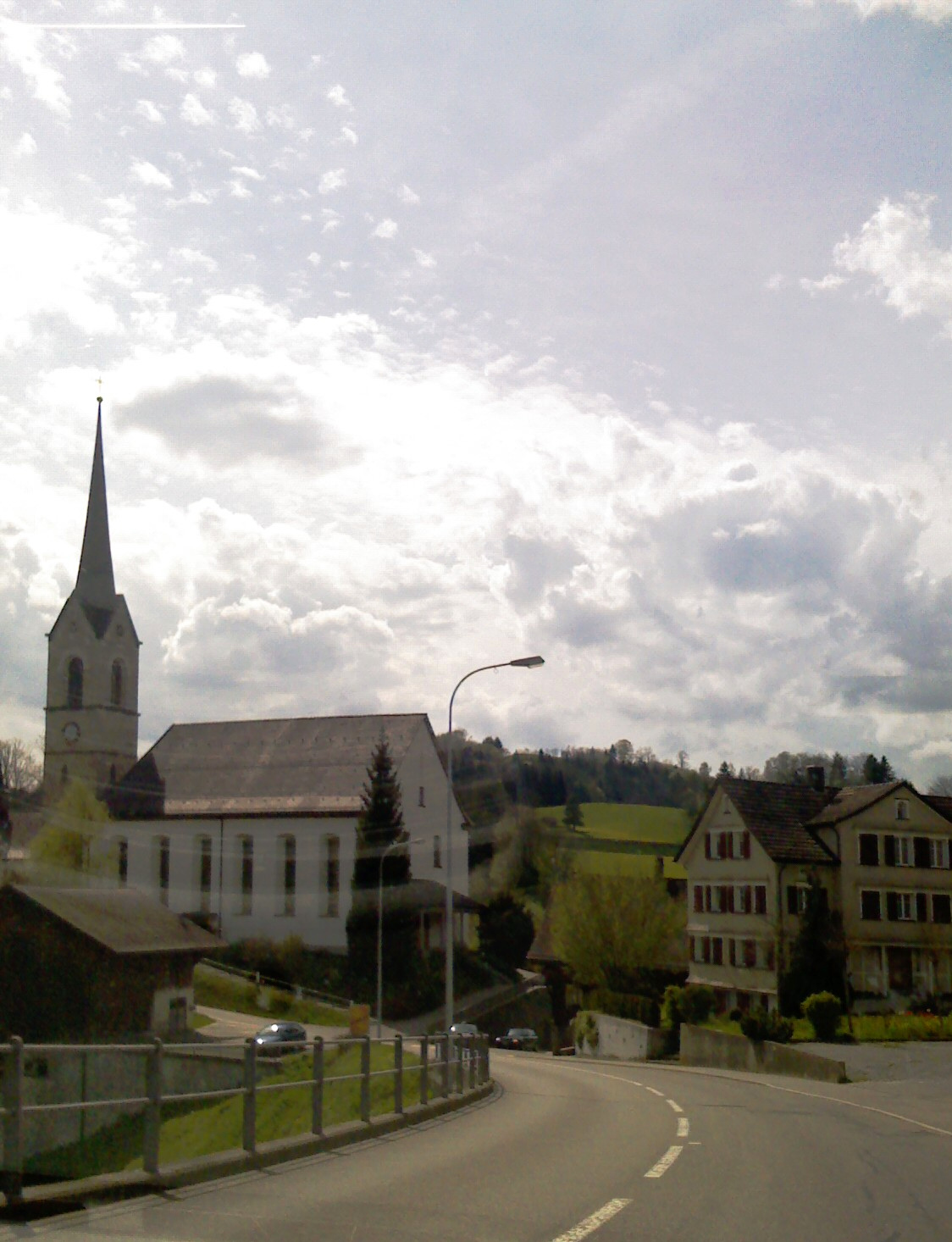
Catholic church in Lütisburg

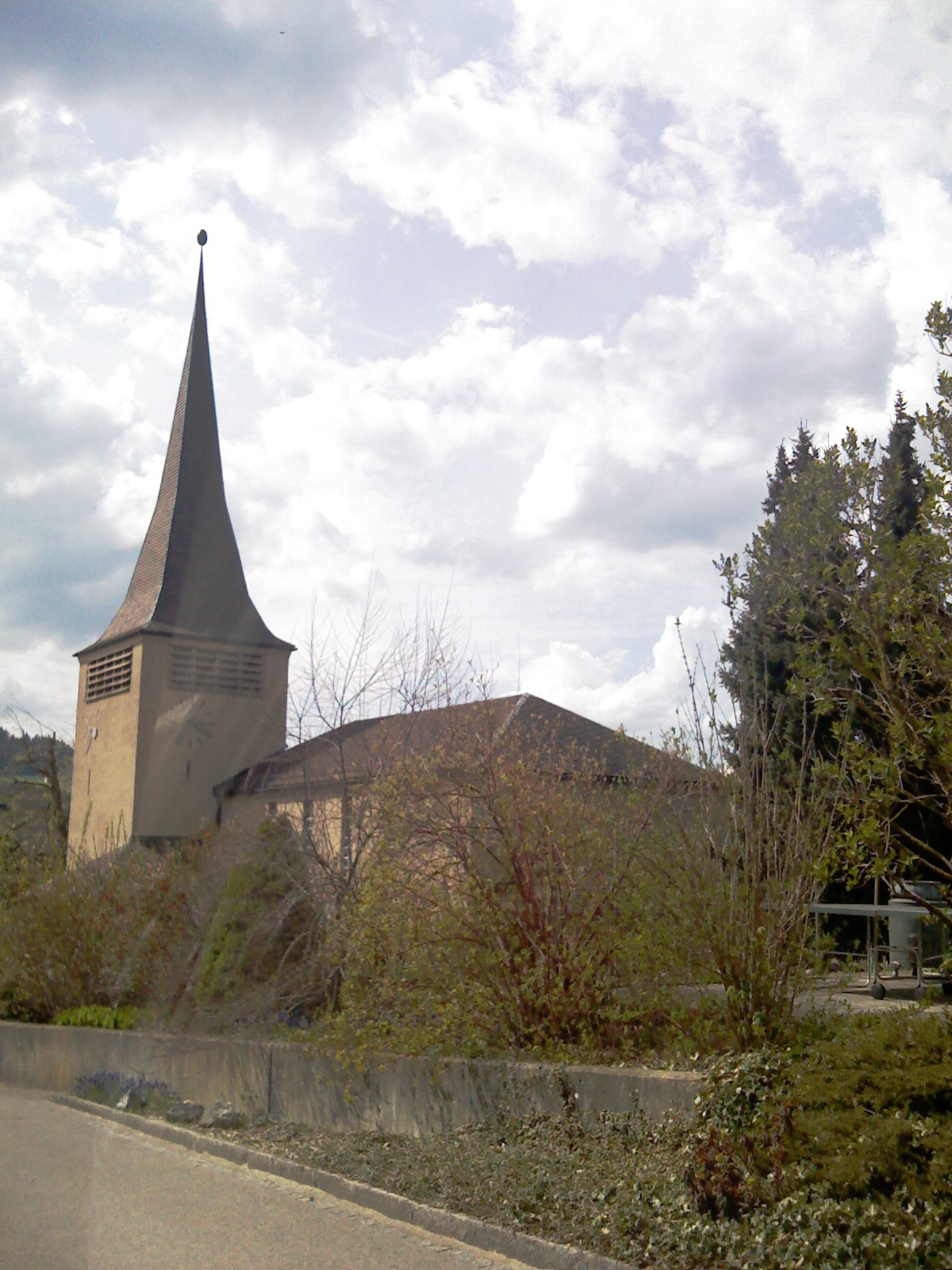
Swiss Reformed church in Lütisburg

From the 2000 census, 670 or 48.0% are Roman Catholic, while 496 or 35.6% belonged to the Swiss Reformed Church. Of the rest of the population, there are 18 individuals (or about 1.29% of the population) who belong to the Orthodox Church, and there are 45 individuals (or about 3.23% of the population) who belong to another Christian church. There are 57 (or about 4.09% of the population) who are Islamic. There are 6 individuals (or about 0.43% of the population) who belong to another church (not listed on the census), 52 (or about 3.73% of the population) belong to no church, are agnostic or atheist, and 51 individuals (or about 3.66% of the population) did not answer the question.

== Transport ==
Lütisburg sits on the Wil–Ebnat-Kappel line between Wattwil and Wil and is served by the St. Gallen S-Bahn at Lütisburg railway station.

== Sights ==
The village of Lütisburg is designated as part of the Inventory of Swiss Heritage Sites.

== Economy ==
As of 2007, Lütisburg had an unemployment rate of 1.16%. As of 2005, there were 144 people employed in the primary economic sector and about 63 businesses involved in this sector. 182 people are employed in the secondary sector and there are 29 businesses in this sector. 277 people are employed in the tertiary sector, with 43 businesses in this sector.

As of October 2009 the average unemployment rate was 1.9%. There were 131 businesses in the municipality of which 34 were involved in the secondary sector of the economy while 38 were involved in the third.

As of 2000 there were 268 residents who worked in the municipality, while 419 residents worked outside Lütisburg and 308 people commuted into the municipality for work.
