= Krinau =

- Former municipality
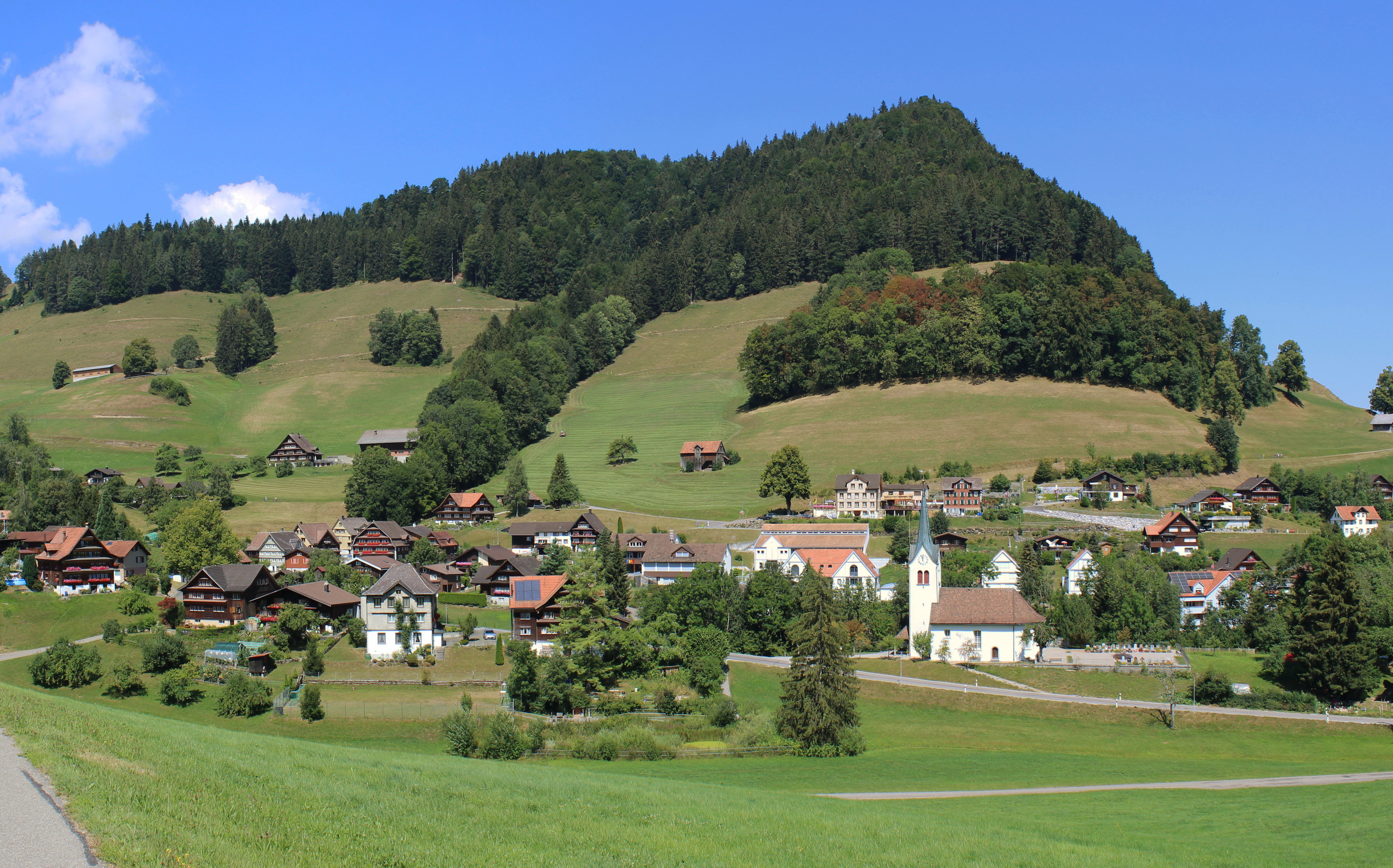

- Coat of arms
- Location of Krinau
- Location within Switzerland Location within Canton of St. Gallen
- Coordinates: 47°20′N 9°03′E
- Country: Switzerland
- Canton: St. Gallen
- District: Wahlkreis Toggenburg

Government
  - Mayor: Madlen Früh-Grob

Area
  - Total: 7.23 km^{2} (2.79 sq mi)
- Elevation: 803 m (2,635 ft)

Population (Dec 2011)
  - Total: 260
  - Density: 36/km^{2} (93/sq mi)
- Time zone: UTC+01:00 (CET)
  - Summer (DST): UTC+02:00 (CEST)
- Postal code: 9622
- SFOS number: 3373
- ISO 3166 code: CH-SG
- Surrounded by: Bütschwil, Mosnang, Wattwil
- Website: www.krinau.ch

Krinau is a former municipality in the Wahlkreis (constituency) of Toggenburg in the canton of St. Gallen in Switzerland. On 1 January 2013 Krinau merged into the municipality of Wattwil.

== History ==
Krinau is first mentioned in 1357 as Krinnow.

== Geography ==
Krinau had an area, as of 2006, of 7.3 km^{2} (2.8 sq mi). Of this area, 57.6% is used for agricultural purposes, while 39.1% is forested. Of the rest of the land, 2.8% is settled (buildings or roads) and the remainder (0.6%) is non-productive (rivers or lakes).

The former municipality is located in the Toggenburg Wahlkreis. It is in the western quarter of the Thur valley on the edge of the Chrüzeggkamm. It consists of the village of Krinau and the hamlets of Altschwil, Au, Dreischlatt, Gurtberg, Schuflenberg, Krinäuli, Niederberg, Kapf and Gruben.

It is a scenic farming village in Toggenburg.

== Coat of arms ==
The blazon of the municipal coat of arms is Or three Pine Trees Vert trunked Gules issuant from a Mount of the second.

== Demographics ==
Krinau had a population (as of 2011) of 260. As of 2007, about 5.9% of the population was made up of foreign nationals. Of the foreign population, (as of 2000), 2 are from Germany, 2 are from Austria, and 2 are from another country. Over the last 10 years the population has grown at a rate of 0.4%. Most of the population (as of 2000) speaks German (98.6%), with Italian being second most common ( 0.4%) and Romansh being third ( 0.4%). Of the Swiss national languages (as of 2000), 274 speak German, 1 person speaks, Italian, and 1 person speaks Romansh.

The age distribution, as of 2000, in Krinau is; 35 children or 12.6% of the population are between 0 and 9 years old and 46 teenagers or 16.5% are between 10 and 19. Of the adult population, 30 people or 10.8% of the population are between 20 and 29 years old. 37 people or 13.3% are between 30 and 39, 38 people or 13.7% are between 40 and 49, and 28 people or 10.1% are between 50 and 59. The senior population distribution is 27 people or 9.7% of the population are between 60 and 69 years old, 27 people or 9.7% are between 70 and 79, there are 10 people or 3.6% who are between 80 and 89.

In 2000 there were 28 persons (or 10.1% of the population) who were living alone in a private dwelling. There were 64 (or 23.0%) persons who were part of a couple (married or otherwise committed) without children, and 152 (or 54.7%) who were part of a couple with children. There were 22 (or 7.9%) people who lived in single parent home, 6 who lived household made up of unrelated persons, and 6 who are either institutionalized or live in another type of collective housing.

In the 2007 federal election the most popular party was the SVP which received 52.3% of the vote. The next three most popular parties were the FDP (17.8%), the CVP (10.1%) and the SP (9%).

The entire Swiss population is generally well educated. In Krinau about 60.6% of the population (between age 25–64) have completed either non-mandatory upper secondary education or additional higher education (either university or a Fachhochschule). Out of the total population in Krinau, as of 2000, the highest education level completed by 93 people (33.5% of the population) was Primary, while 83 (29.9%) have completed the Secondary level, 27 (9.7%) have attended a Tertiary school, and 9 (3.2%) are not in school. The remainder did not answer this question.

The historical population is given in the following table:

year	population
1789	180
1850	452
1900	381
1950	320
2000	278

== Economy ==
As of 2007, Krinau had an unemployment rate of 1.19%. As of 2005, there were 53 people employed in the primary economic sector and about 23 businesses involved in this sector. 12 people are employed in the secondary sector and there are 3 businesses in this sector. 22 people are employed in the tertiary sector, with 7 businesses in this sector.

As of October 2009 the average unemployment rate was 3.6%. There were 29 businesses in the municipality of which 3 were involved in the secondary sector of the economy while 4 were involved in the third.

As of 2000 there were 69 residents who worked in the municipality, while 69 residents worked outside Krinau and 15 people commuted into the municipality for work.

== Religion ==
From the 2000 census, 88 or 31.7% are Roman Catholic, while 174 or 62.6% belonged to the Swiss Reformed Church. Of the rest of the population there is 1 individual who belongs to another Christian church and there are 15 (or about 5.40% of the population) who belong to no church, are agnostic or atheist.
