= Wil–Ebnat-Kappel railway =

Railway line in Switzerland

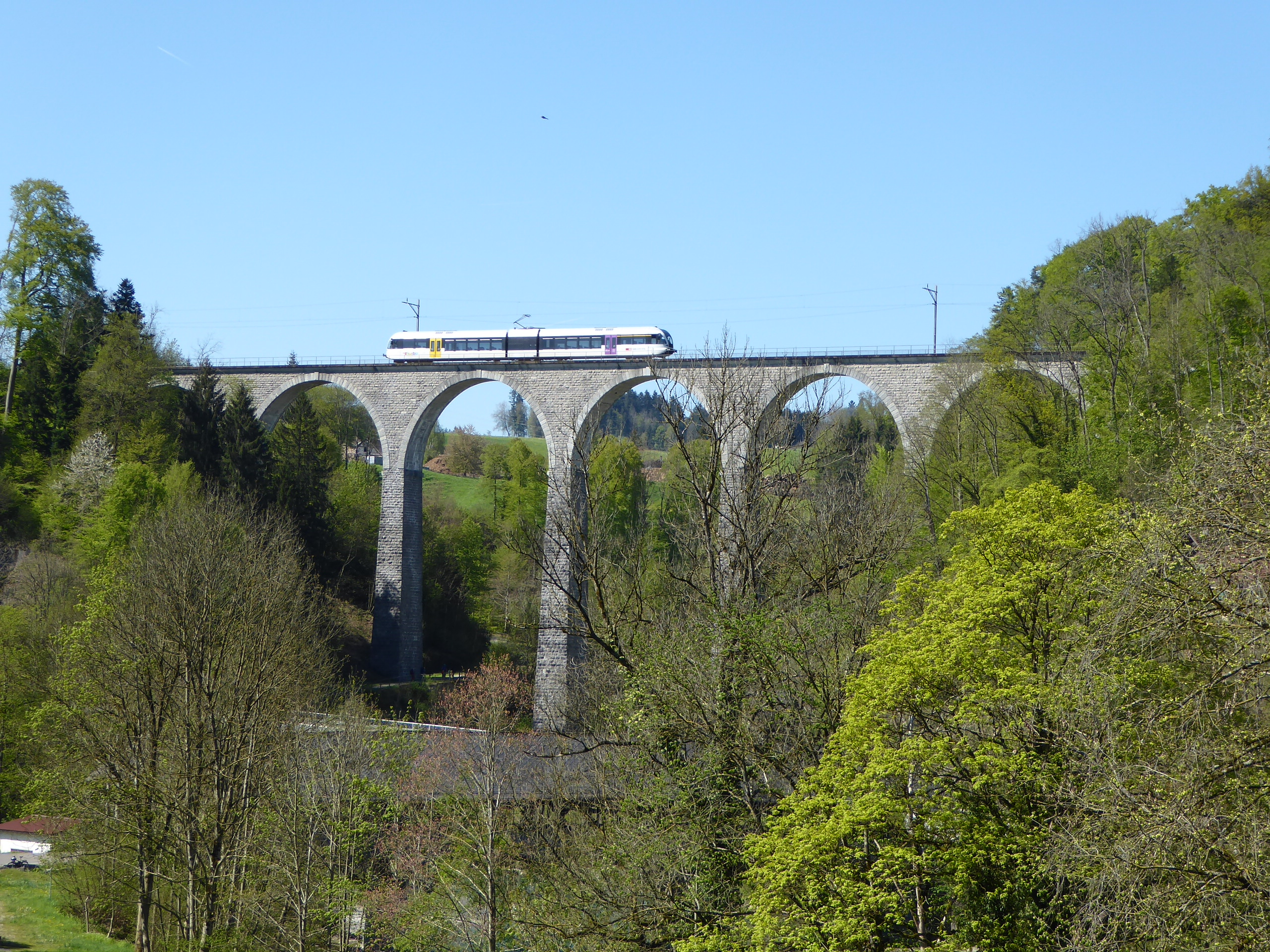
- GTW 2/6 on the Guggenloch bridge near Lütisburg

Overview
- Native name: Toggenburgerbahn
- Owner: Swiss Federal Railways
- Line number: 853
- Termini: Wil; Ebnat-Kappel

Technical
- Line length: 24.86 km (15.45 mi)
- Number of tracks: 1
- Track gauge: 1,435 mm (4 ft 8 1/2 in) standard gauge
- Electrification: 15 kV/16.7 Hz AC overhead catenary
- Maximum incline: 1.5%

The Wil–Ebnat-Kappel railway is a single-track standard-gauge line that runs through the Toggenburg region of Switzerland. It was built by the Toggenburgerbahn (Toggenburg Railway; TB). Its 25 kilometre-long, standard gauge line from Wil via Wattwil to Ebnat-Kappel was opened on 24 June 1870. The TB was nationalised as of 1 July 1902 and became part of the Swiss Federal Railways (SBB).

== History ==
=== Project development and construction ===
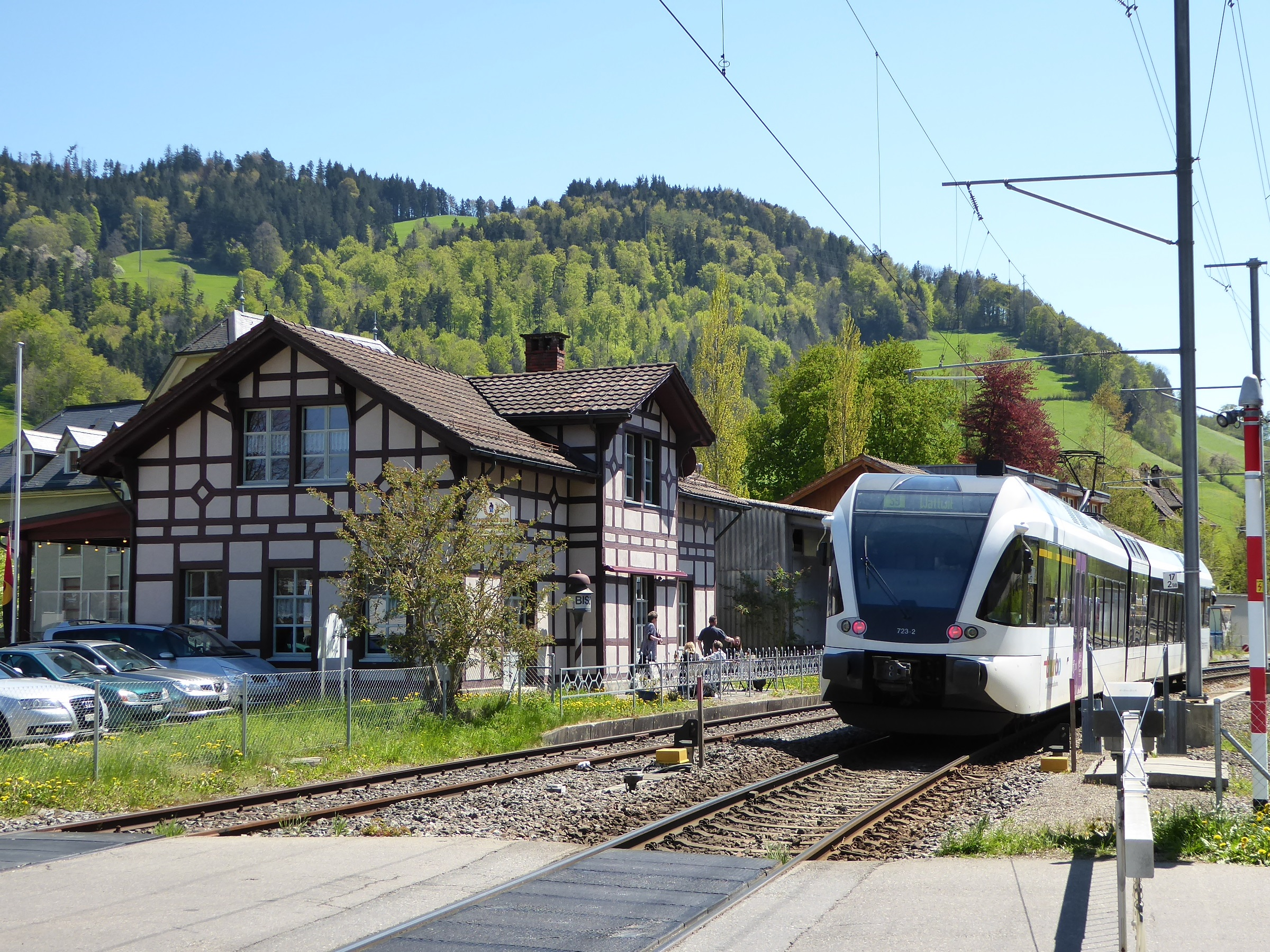
The old station building in Lichtensteig dates back to the construction period of the Toggenburg railway. With the construction of the Bodensee–Toggenburg railway, a new station with a new station building was built in 1910 where the lines diverge at the junction (Keilbahnhof). The old station is now used as a bistro.

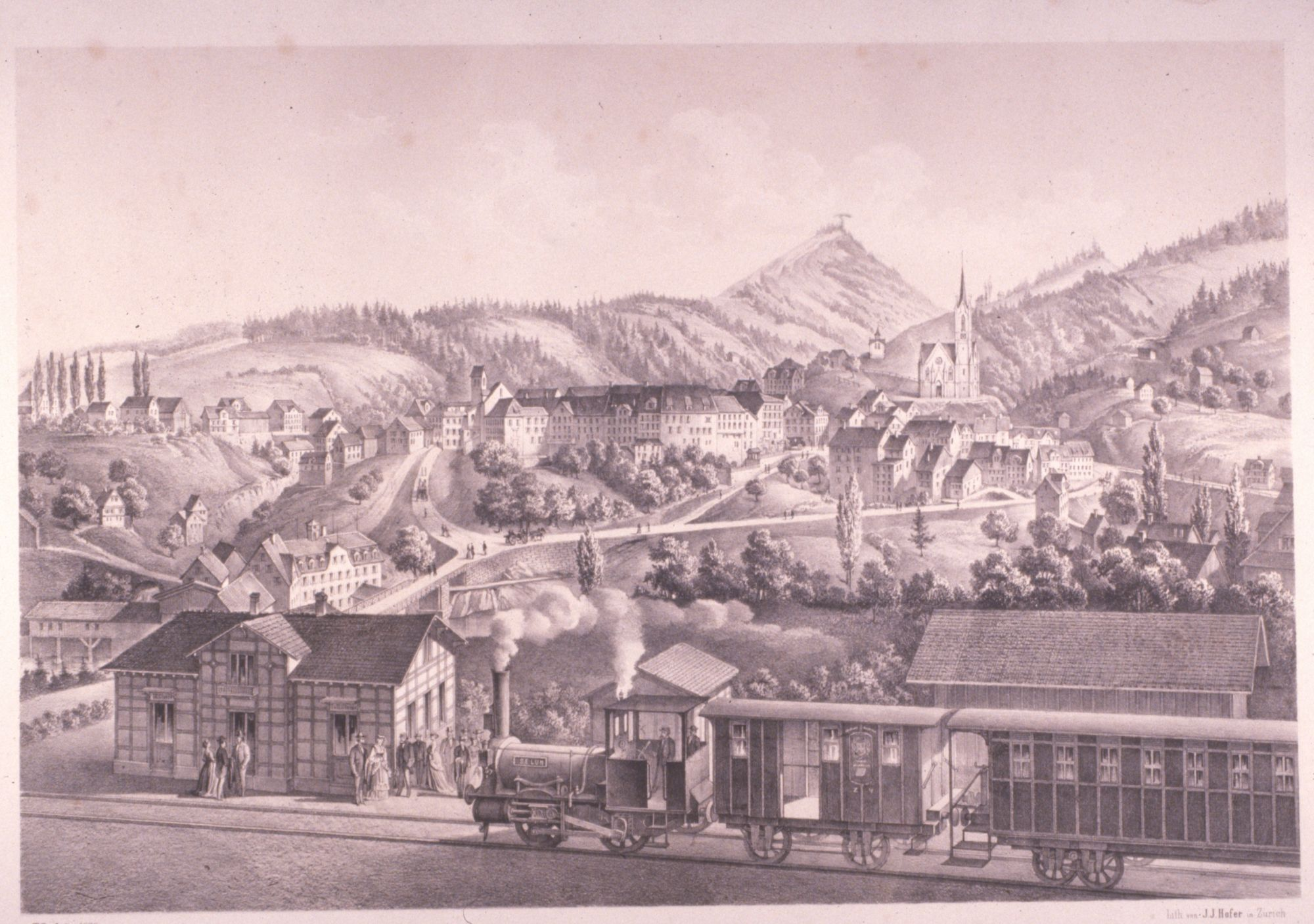
Train of the Toggenburg Railway in Lichtensteig, lithograph. (Note: The locomotives of the TB, however, had three axles, unlike the picture)

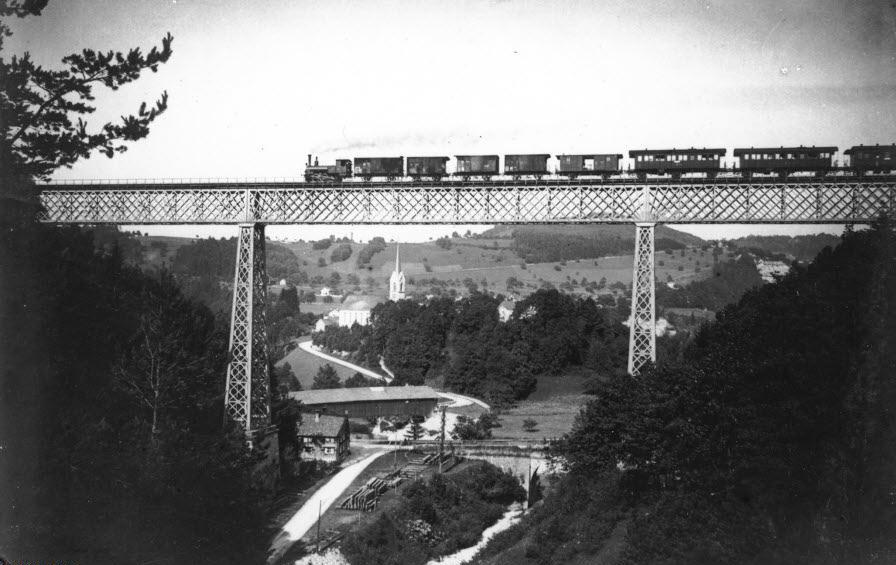
Guggenloch Bridge near Lütisburg. The bridge, which was completed in 1875, was rebuilt in 1945 as a stone arch bridge.

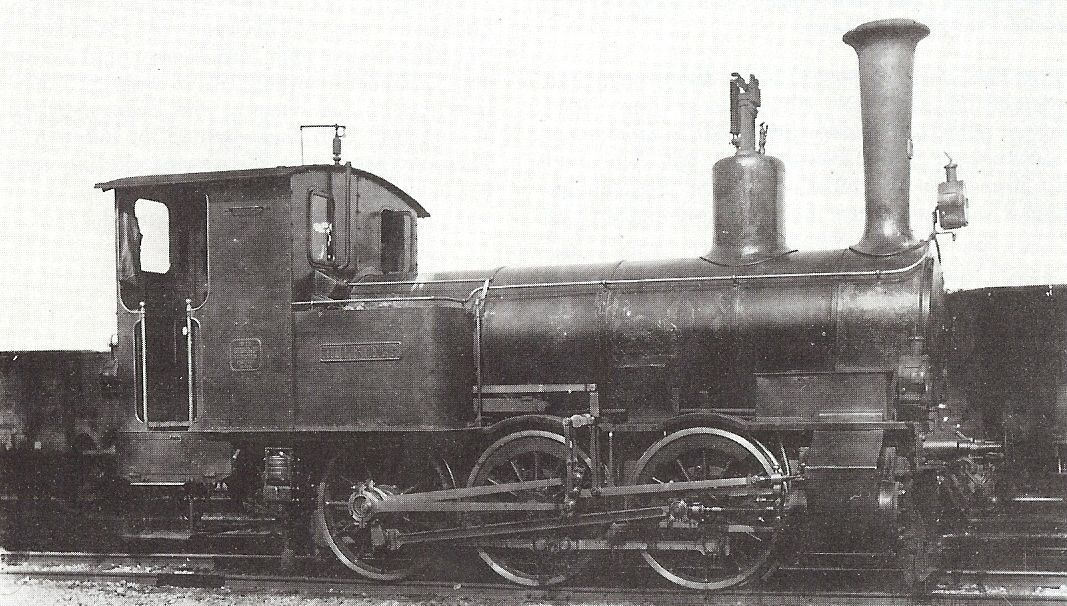
Steam locomotive E 3/3 number 1 "Hülftegg" of the Toggenburgerbahn

After the opening of the St. Gallen–Winterthur railway there were strong demands for a railway in the Toggenburg. As early as 1856, a planning commission founded on the initiative of industrialists led by Johann Rudolf Raschle commissioned a design for a Wil–Ebnat railway. An option that would have run from Lütisburg to Uzwil or Flawil was rejected for topographical and financial reasons. A detailed financial estimate amounting to Swiss francs (CHF) 6 million was compiled at the end of 1858.

For a long time nothing was heard about the project. In 1864, the Bern construction company Wieland, Gubser & Cie. expressed interest in it. The railway committee provided the company with all of its documents. The canton of St. Gallen acquired shares worth CHF 2.5 million and CHF 1.5 million was subscribed by municipalities and private individuals. In 1868, the construction company agreed to build the railway together with all of the buildings on the line within two years for CHF 3 million. Three E 3/3 locomotives were built by Krauss & Co. The official opening of the TB took place on 23 June 1870. The company was particularly proud of the 54.5 metre-high Guggenloch Bridge near Lütisburg.

=== Operations ===
The operation of the TB was carried out by the United Swiss Railways (Vereinigte Schweizerbahnen, VSB) until its nationalisation. Initially, four trains, later five, ran daily between Wil and Ebnat. The income from passenger and freight traffic was roughly in balance. The TB was a financially sound company and was able to pay dividends practically every year.

=== Nationalisation ===
In the run-up to nationalisation, projects were underway that provided for a connection between St. Gallen and the St. Gallen peninsula. The St. Gallen–Zug railway committee chose a route through the Toggenburg, which would also later allow direct access to the Gotthard Railway. The committee had already received a concession for this in 1890, but it could not finance the planned Ricken Tunnel. The canton of St. Gallen acquired the TB for CHF 2.75 million in 1901 and transferred it at no cost to the VSB. With the nationalisation of the VSB in 1902, the TB was integrated into the SBB. This virtually free transfer of the TB to the Federal Government was the financial contribution of the canton of St. Gallen to the construction of the CHF 12 million Ricken Tunnel.

=== Ricken Railway ===
The Uznach–Wattwil railway (Ricken Railway) from Wattwil to Uznach and connecting to the existing railway to Rapperswil was opened on 1 October 1910. The direct connection from Wattwil to St. Gallen was opened two days later by the Bodensee-Toggenburg-Bahn (BT).

Even then, the former TB and the BT had several points of contact, so Lichtensteig and Wattwil stations were shared with the BT. In addition, there was a false double track between the two stations, as the lines of the SBB and the BT were laid next to each other.

Functionally, the Toggenburg Railway was extended on 1 October 1912 by the BT line from Ebnat-Kappel to Nesslau-Neu St. Johann, which also meant that Ebnat-Kappel became a joint station.

=== Electrification ===
On 4 October 1926, there was an accident in the Ricken Tunnel (carbon monoxide poisoning of the train crew of a stopped freight train), which forced the SBB to electrify the tunnel immediately at 15 kV/16 2/3 (now 16.7) Hz AC and steam operation in the tunnel was prohibited as of 15 May 1927. The BT was thus also forced to electrify its line to restore through operations. Although the SBB did not prioritise the electrification of the Toggenburg Railway, BT wanted to switch completely to electric operation, but it was forced to lease the Wattwil–Ebnat section from the SBB to provide a continuous overhead line on its Ebnat-Kappel–Nesslau-Neu St. Johann section.

Electrical operations on the St. Gallen–Wattwil–Nesslau-Neu St. Johann line commenced on 4 October 1931, which also meant that through trains could through the Ricken Tunnel. With the permanent lease of the Wattwil–Ebnat-Kappel section to the BT, the SBB retired from the operation of Ebnat-Kappel station at the same time.

Steam traction lasted for twelve years on the remaining 20 km of the Toggenburg railway between Wil and Wattwil before electrical operations also started there on 12 December 1943. This removed the curiosity that only the BT track was electrified between Wattwil and Lichtensteig, while the SBB track was not. As part of the electrification, the Bazenheid and Dietfurt bridges were rebuilt in 1943. The new Guggenloch Bridge was opened in 1945.

=== Adjustment of property boundaries ===
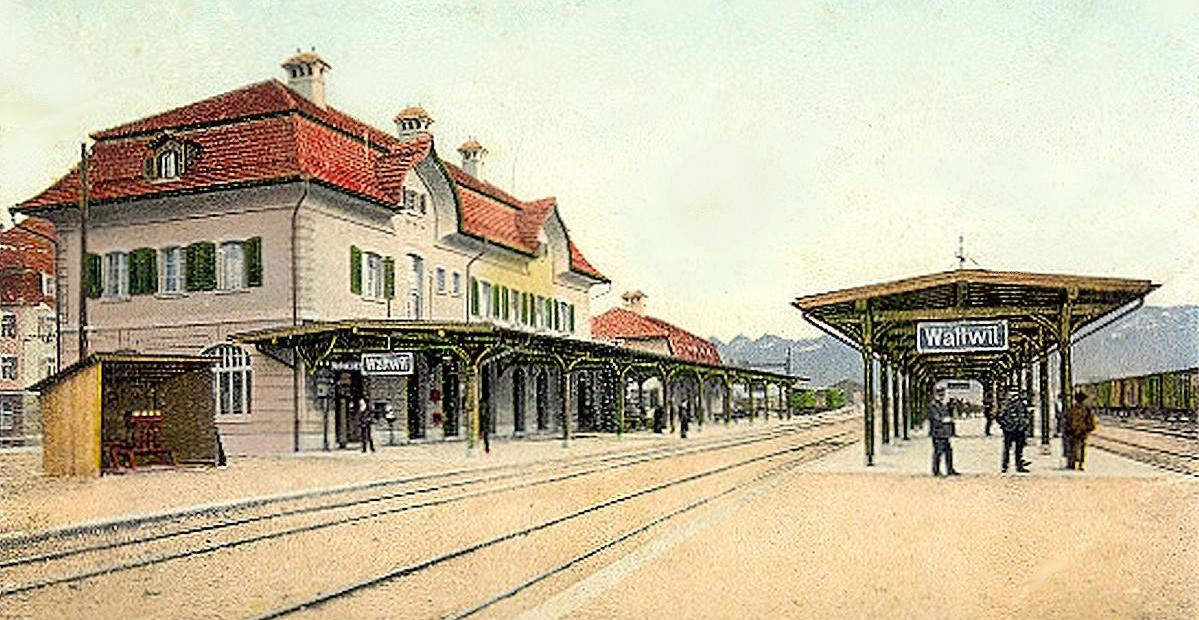
In 1910, the BT was opened and the SBB opened the Ricken line to Uznach, so a larger entrance building had to be built in Wattwil. This became the property of SOB in 2005.

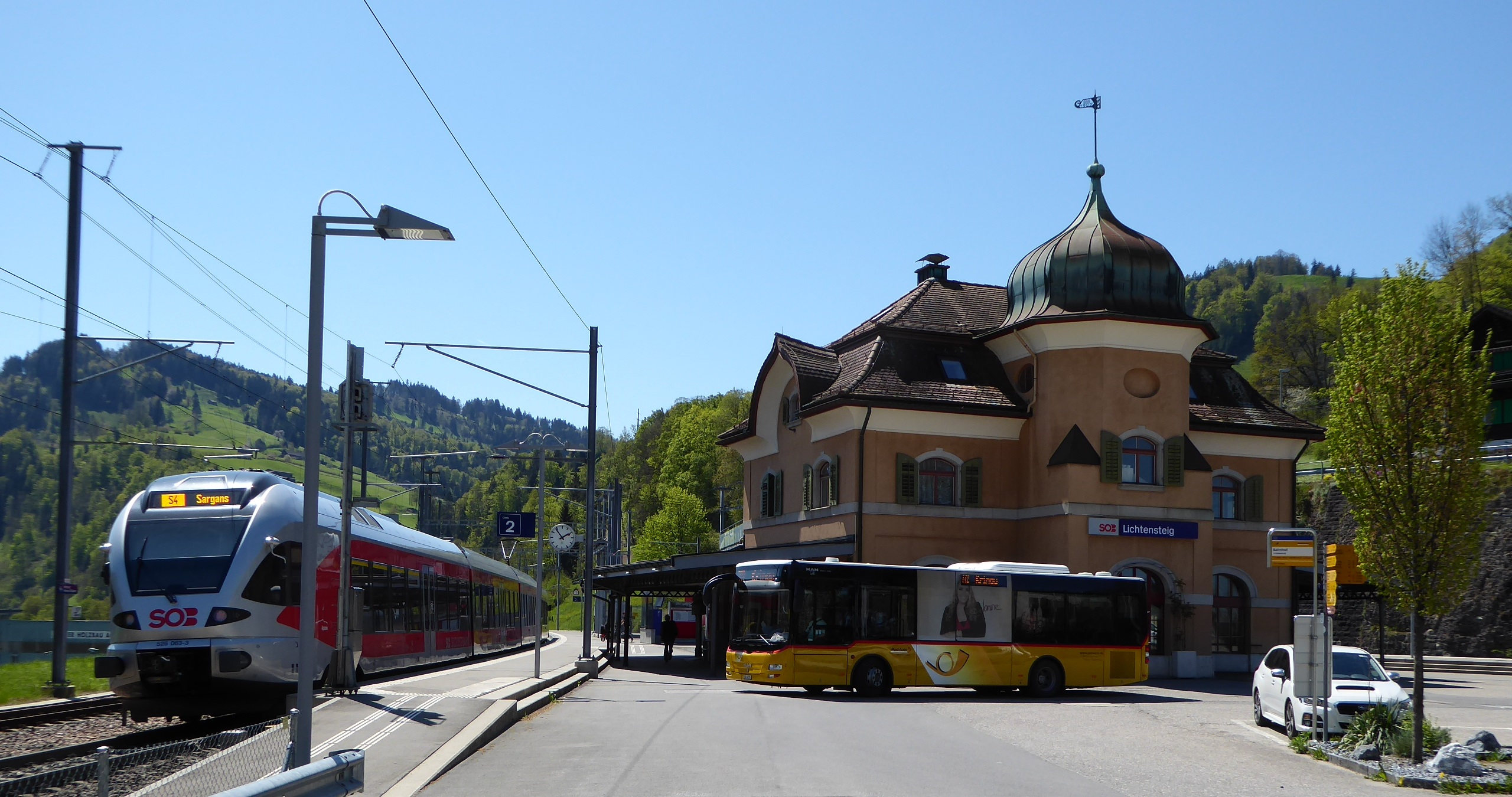
The "wedge" station of Lichtensteig, on the left is the track of the SOB with a Stadler FLIRT (RABe 526), in the middle of the post bus to Krinau. The track of the Toggenburg Railway runs behind the station building.

Limited double-track operations became possible on the Wattwil–Lichtensteig section after limited infrastructure adjustments in 1977/1978. With the merger of BT and the Schweizerischen Südostbahn (SOB) on 1 January 2001—while maintaining the latter name—the SOB became a contractual partner of the SBB. The contractually regulated use of the rail systems since the opening of BT was replaced in the Rail Reform 1 program by the so-called open-access network.

In the course of 2005, SBB and SOB finally agreed on an adjustment of the ownership structure: the SBB ceded its share of Lichtensteig and Wattwil stations, terminated its lease of the Wattwil–Ebnat section and ceded the second track between Lichtensteig and Wattwil. In return, it received the SOB share of St. Gallen station. With the transfers completed in 2006, the SBB now only retains the Wil–Lichtensteig section of the former Toggenburg Railway.

== Operations ==
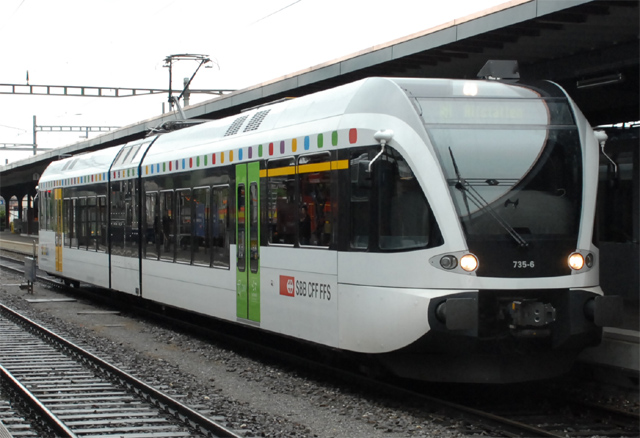
GTW trains of Thurbo are used on the Wil–Wattwil route.

From the electrification of the line until the commencement of the 2013 timetable, operations on the Wil–Nesslau-Neu St. Johann route were operated end to end. Rolling stock from the SBB and the BT was used. The SBB considered abandoning operations on the line in the 1970s.

The line has been operated as line S9 of the St. Gallen S-Bahn since 2009. In preparation, the platforms at the stations of Bazenheid, Bütschwil and Dietfurt were raised and extended. An outer platform was built with a pedestrian underpass in Bütschwil, where the half-hourly trains cross. Bazenheid received a covered passenger shelter. A new computer-based interlocking was initially remotely controlled from St. Gallen.

Since the commencement of the 2013 timetable, Thurbo trains have run on the Wil–Wattwil section as line S9 of the St. Gallen S-Bahn at half-hour intervals. Some trains continue as line S10 to Weinfelden, but this is shown neither in the timetable nor on the platform displays. Thurbo trains run as line S8 from Nesslau-Neu St. Johann via St. Gallen and Kreuzlingen to Schaffhausen.

Services on the line from Wil to Nesslau-Neu St. Johann are set out in the Swiss timetable as table 853.
