= Baughman (surname) =

Baughman (Americanized form of German and Swiss German Bachmann or Baumann, compare Boughman) is a surname. Notable people with the surname include:

- Deiton Baughman (born 1996), American tennis player
- Elise Baughman, American voice actress
- George F. Baughman (1915–2004), American university president and United States Naval Reserve officer
- J. Ross Baughman, American Pulitzer Prize winning photojournalist
- James L. Baughman (1952–2016), American journalism professor
- John Baughman (1941–2000), American murderer and suspected serial killer
- Justin Baughman (born 1974), American baseball player
- Mary Baughman (1874–1956), American physician, medical college professor
- Milo Baughman (1923–2003), American furniture designer
- R. Wayne Baughman (1941–2022), American wrestler and wrestling coach
- Ray Baughman (1943–2025), American chemist and nanotechnologist
- Red Baughman, American football coach
- T. H. Baughman (born 1947), professor of history and author of books on Antarctic exploration
- U. E. Baughman (1905–1978), chief of the United States Secret Service
- Charlotte Baughman, fictional character portrayed by Anya Taylor-Joy as the first girlfriend of Barack Obama in the 2016 American drama film Barry
