= Baughman =

Baughman may refer to:

== People ==
- Baughman (surname)

== Places ==
=== United States ===
- Baughman Settlement, West Virginia, an unincorporated community in Hardy County, West Virginia
- Baughman Township, Ohio, a township

== Other uses ==
- The Baughman Center, two buildings (a chapel or pavilion and an administration building) on the campus of the University of Florida in Gainesville, Florida, in the United States
- Baughman Creek (Oregon), a stream located in Tillamook County, Oregon, in the United States
- USS Helen Baughman (SP-1292), a United States Navy patrol vessel in commission from 1917 to 1918
