= Bachman =

Bachman may refer to:

- Bachman (surname)
- Bachman, Ohio
- Bachman, West Virginia
- Bachman Khan (1210–1239 or 1240), a Kimak khan
- Bachmann knot, often used in mountaineering for ascending on ropes
- Bachman Station, a train station on the Dallas Area Rapid Transit Green and Orange Lines

== See also ==
- Bachmann
- Backman
