= Bachman (surname) =

Bachman is an Anglicized spelling of the surname Bachmann. Notable people with the surname include:

- Alex Bachman (born 1996), American football player
- Andrew Bachman (born 1983), American entrepreneur
- Bill Bachman (born 1952), American percussionist
- Charlie Bachman (1892–1985), American football player and coach
- Charles Bachman (1924–2017), American computer scientist
- Charles A. Bachman (1882–1966), American actor
- Daniel Bachman (born 1989), American guitarist
- Darrick Bachman (born 1960), American television writer
- Dora Sandoe Bachman (1869–1930), American lawyer, suffragist, school official
- Elisabeth Bachman (born 1978), American volleyball player
- Elizabeth Cody Bachman (1898–1985), American clubwoman
- Gábor Bachman (born 1952), Hungarian architect
- Henry L. Bachman (born 1930), American electrical engineer
- Isaac Bachman (born 1957), Israeli diplomat
- James Bachman (born 1972), British comedian and writer
- Jay Bachman (born 1945), American football player
- John Bachman (1790–1874), American naturalist
- Lorelei Bachman (born 1973), Canadian songwriter
- Melissa Bachman (born 1984), American hunter
- Nathan L. Bachman (1878–1937), American politician
- Randy Bachman (born 1943), Canadian musician
- Reuben Knecht Bachman (1834–1911), American politician
- Richard Bachman (ice hockey) (born 1987), American ice hockey player
- Robbie Bachman (1953–2023), Canadian drummer
- S. A. Bachman (born 1957), American artist and advocate
- Sam Bachman (born 1999), American baseball player
- Tal Bachman (born 1968), Canadian musician
- Ted Bachman (1951–2023), American football player
- Tim Bachman (1951–2023), Canadian guitarist
- Walter Bachman (disambiguation), multiple people
- William Bachman (1908–1993), American politician
