= Backman =

Backman (also Bäckman) is a surname. Notable people with the surname include:

- Andreas Bäckman (born 1995), Swedish racing driver
- Asta Backman (1917–2010), Finnish actress
- Christian Bäckman (born 1980), Swedish ice hockey player
- Derek Backman (born 1966), American soccer player
- Eric Backman (1896–1965), Swedish athlete
- Fredrik Backman (born 1981), Swedish author, blogger, and columnist
- Gunilla Backman (born 1965), Swedish singer, actress and musical artist
- Hans Backman (born 1963), Swedish politician
- Ingemar Backman (born 1976), Swedish snowboarder
- Jani Bäckman (born 1988), Finnish football player
- Johan Bäckman (born 1971), Finnish political author, legal sociologist and criminologist
- Karl Backman (born 1970), Swedish artist and musician
- Kennard Backman (born 1993), American football player
- Kjell Bäckman (1934–2019), Swedish speed skater
- Lars Bäckman (born 1945), Swedish chef
- Linnea Bäckman (born 1991), Swedish ice hockey player
- Mattias Bäckman (born 1992), Swedish ice hockey player
- Mike Backman (born 1955), Canadian ice hockey player
- Niklas Backman (born 1988), Swedish footballer
- Ola Backman (1928–2016), Swedish Navy rear admiral
- Paul Backman (1920–1995), Finnish cyclist
- Per Bäckman (born 1950), Swedish ice hockey player
- Py Bäckman (born 1948), Swedish musician
- Robert L. Backman (1922–2022), American lawyer and politician
- Roland Bäckman (born 1960), Swedish politician
- Sarah Bäckman (born 1991), Swedish real estate broker and wrestler
- Sean Backman (born 1986), American ice hockey player
- Tomas Backman (born 1980), Swedish footballer
- Wally Backman (born 1959), American baseball player and manager
- Þuríður Backman (born 1948), Icelandic politician

== See also ==
- René Backmann (1944–2026), French journalist and author
- Bachman (disambiguation)
- Bachmann
