= Immenberg =

Mountain in Switzerland

- Imebärg
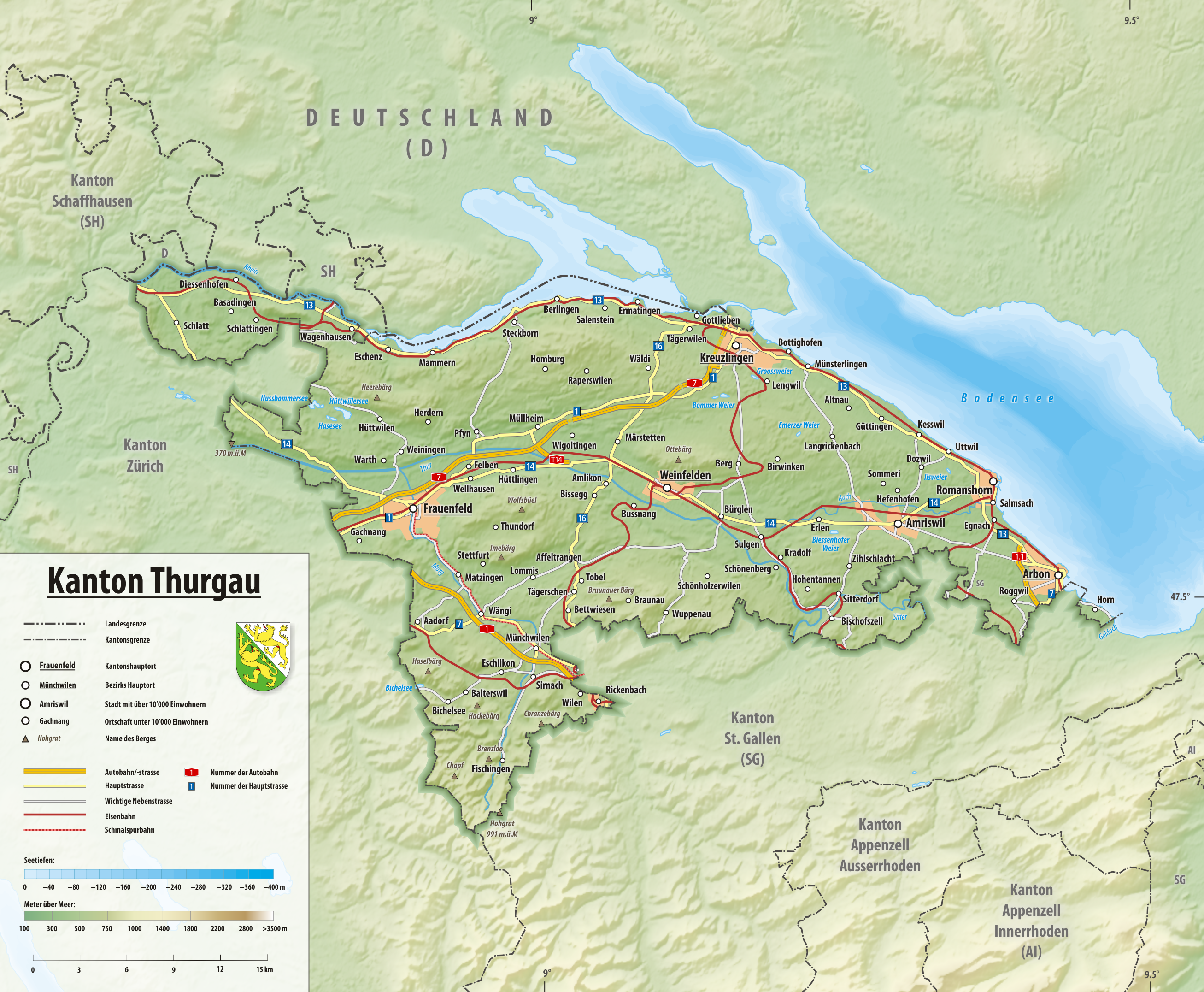
- Location within Switzerland Location within Canton of Thurgau

Highest point
- Elevation: 706 m (2,316 ft)
- Prominence: 198 m (650 ft)
- Coordinates: 47°31′51″N 8°58′36″E

Geography
- Location: Thurgau, Switzerland

The Immenberg (also spelled Imebärg) is a mountain located between Thundorf and Stettfurt in the canton of Thurgau.

The summit forms a wooded plateau, which is traversed by several trails. On the south-west slopes of the mountain is located the Sonnenberg Castle.
