= Borchmann =

Borchmann is a surname. Notable people with the surname include:

- Anke Borchmann (born 1954), German rower
- Svend Borchmann Hersleb (1784–1836), Norwegian professor
- Svend Borchmann Hersleb Vogt (1852–1923), Norwegian jurist
- Ernst Otto Borchmann, German rower

== See also ==
- Bochmann
