= Bachmann =

Bachmann is a surname of Switzerland and Germany. It originates as a description of the bearer as dwelling near a brook (Bach), such as a farm "Hofstatt am Bach" also called "Bachmanns Hofstatt" near Hinwil or Dürnten (recorded 1387), or the "Hof zum Bach" near Richterswil (recorded 1555).

Low German variants of the name include Beckman(n); Beekman(n).

== Switzerland ==
There are three main lines of Bachmann families in Switzerland,

- Canton of Thurgau/Canton of Zürich: Attested from 1361 at Stettfurt and Thundorf. Protestants since the Swiss Reformation, this branch came to riches trading wine and linen during the 18th century. Jakob Huldreich Bachmann was a national councillor and a federal judge.
- Canton of Zug: attested in Menzingen and Zug from 1359. Several reeves and city councillors in the 15th to 16th century.
- Canton of Glarus: this branch moved into Glarus from the Linth plain in the 17th century, and occupied a number of political and military offices in Glarus in the 18th to 19th centuries.

== Germany ==
A Bachmann family of Bohemia is attested as bearing arms in the 15th century. Their coat of arms displays two linden leaves.

== North America ==
The name is often anglicized to Bachman in North America, and sometimes as Baughman.

== People ==
- Andreas Bachmann, German journalist (born 1974)
- August Bachmann, German physician and botanist (1652–1723) also known as Augustus Quirinus Rivinus
- Barbara Bachmann (1924–1999), American biologist
- Carl G. Bachmann (1890–1980), United States Congress Representative
- Carolin Bachmann (born 1988), German politician
- Eric Bachmann (born 1970), American musician / producer
- Ernesto Bachmann, the namesake of the Ernesto Bachmann Paleontological Museum in Neuquén, Argentina
- Franz Ewald Theodor Bachmann (1850–1937), German medical and naturalist
- Georg Bachmann (1885–1971), German politician
- Heinz Bachmann (1924–2022), American mathematician
- Ida Bachmann (1900–1995), Danish librarian and journalist
- Ingeborg Bachmann (1926–1973), Austrian poet and author
- John Bachmann (1814–1996), Swiss lithographer and artist
- Josef Bachmann (1945–1970), German would-be assassin
- Joseph Siegmund Bachmann (1754–1825), German organist and composer
- Karl Josef von Bachmann (1734–1792), Swiss aristocrat and general
- Lutz Bachmann (born 1973), German far-right activist, founder of PEGIDA
- Michele Bachmann (born 1956), member of the U.S. Congress from Minnesota
- Niklaus Franz von Bachmann (1740–1831), Swiss nobleman and general
- Paul Bachmann (1837–1920), German mathematician
- René Bachmann, (born 1967) also known as Robert Flux, German guitar player and music producer, member of the band OOMPH!
- Ramona Bachmann (born 1990), Swiss football (soccer) player
- Werner Emmanuel Bachmann (1901–1951), U.S. chemist

== Companies ==
- Bachmann Branchline, a British company producing model railway items

== See also ==
- Bachman (disambiguation)
- Backman
- Bøckmann
