= Bochman =

Bochman, Bøchman is a surname. Notable people with the surname include:

- Dvora Bochman (born 1950), Israeli artist, painter, sculptor, graphic designer, and art educator
- Lasse Bøchman (born 1983), Danish cyclist

== See also ==
- Bachman (surname)
- Bochmann
