= Sonnenberg Castle =

Castle in Stettfurt, Switzerland

Coordinates: 47°31′41″N 8°57′43″E

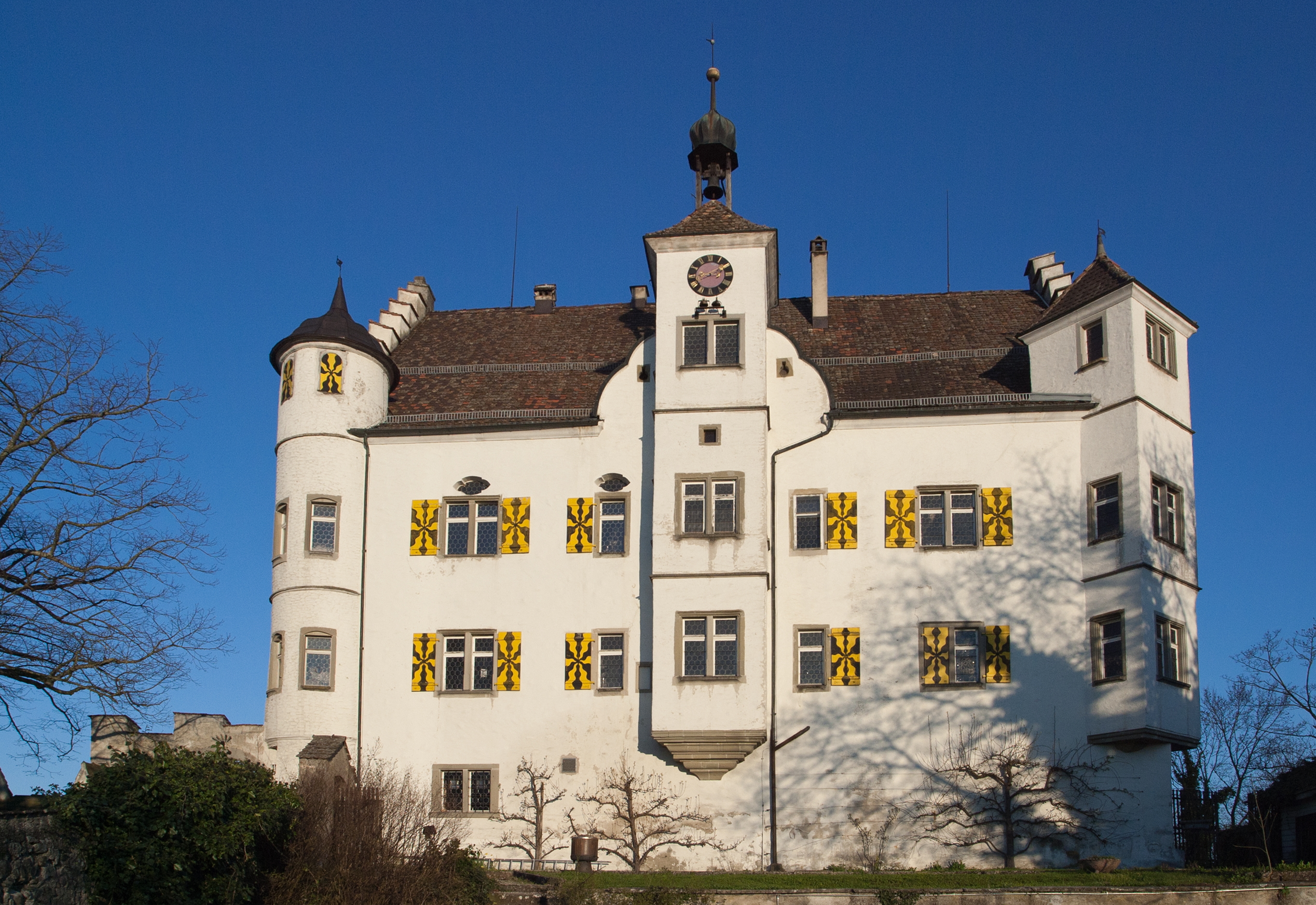
Sonnenberg Castle

Sonnenberg Castle is a castle in the municipality of Stettfurt of the Canton of Thurgau in Switzerland. It is a Swiss heritage site of national significance. The site is first recorded in 1242 as Sunnunbergh, when it served as the seat of a ministerial noble family; later owners included the von Landenberg family, whose medieval castle was destroyed during regional conflicts in 1407 and 1444.In 1580 the St. Gallen patrician Jost Zollikofer bought the ruined complex, and after a major fire in 1595 he had the present late‑Renaissance residence erected as a multi‑storey gabled palace surrounded by outer walls and gate structures.

In 2007 the Austrian investor Christian Baha purchased the castle and its c. 150‑hectare agricultural estate and began a long‑running restoration and conversion into a private residence; repeated stoppages to the works and a prominently visible construction crane have since attracted regional media attention.

The castle is located on the slopes of the Immenberg at 649 metres (2,129 ft).

== See also ==
- List of castles in Switzerland
