= Lommis =

- Municipality
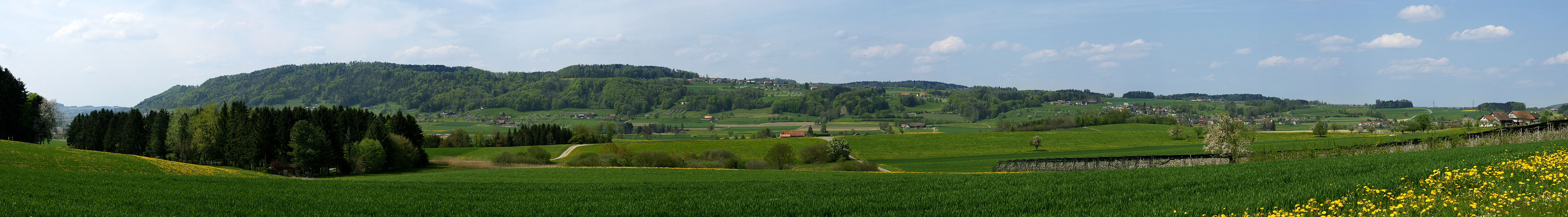

- Coat of arms
- Location of Lommis
- Location within Switzerland Location within Canton of Thurgau
- Coordinates: 47°31′N 8°59′E
- Country: Switzerland
- Canton: Thurgau
- District: Münchwilen

Area
  - Total: 8.6 km^{2} (3.3 sq mi)
- Elevation: 475 m (1,558 ft)

Population (December 2007)
  - Total: 1,049
  - Density: 120/km^{2} (320/sq mi)
- Time zone: UTC+01:00 (CET)
  - Summer (DST): UTC+02:00 (CEST)
- Postal code: 9506
- SFOS number: 4741
- ISO 3166 code: CH-TG
- Surrounded by: Affeltrangen, Bettwiesen, Stettfurt, Thundorf, Tobel-Tägerschen, Wängi
- Website: lommis.ch

Lommis is a municipality in the district of Münchwilen in the canton of Thurgau in Switzerland.

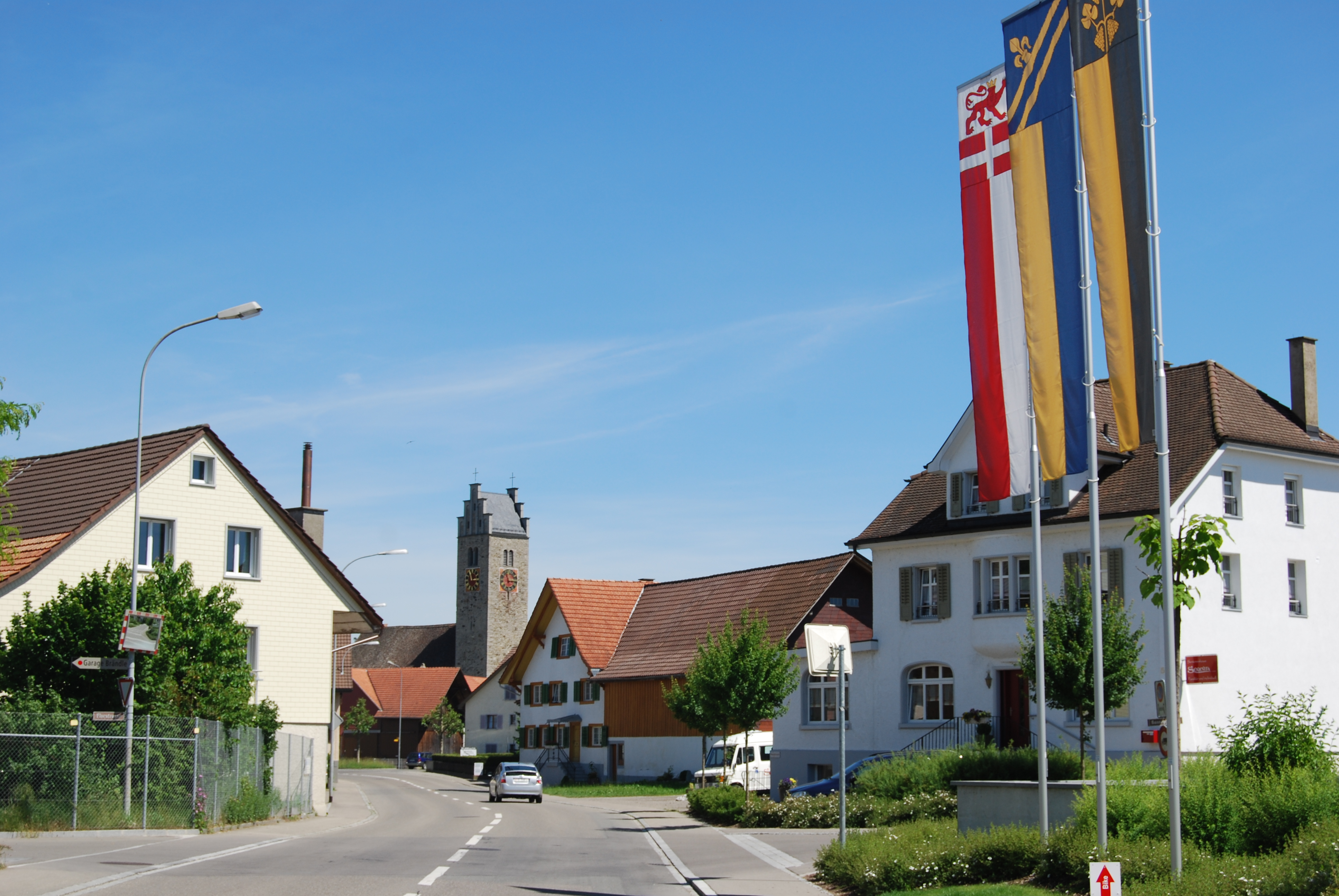
Lommis

== History ==
Lommis is first mentioned in 824 as Loubmeissa and Kalthäusern is first mentioned in 1296 as Kalthusiren.

In 854 St. Gallen received property in the region around Lommis. Around 1200, the Herrschaft of Lommis was a fief of Reichenau Abbey of Reichenau and the Counts of Toggenburg, in the possession of the Ministerialis (unfree knights in the service of a feudal overlord) family of Lommis. In 1443 Petermann of Raron bought the village. After a further changing hands, it came to Fischingen Abbey in 1599. It remained under the Abbey until 1798.

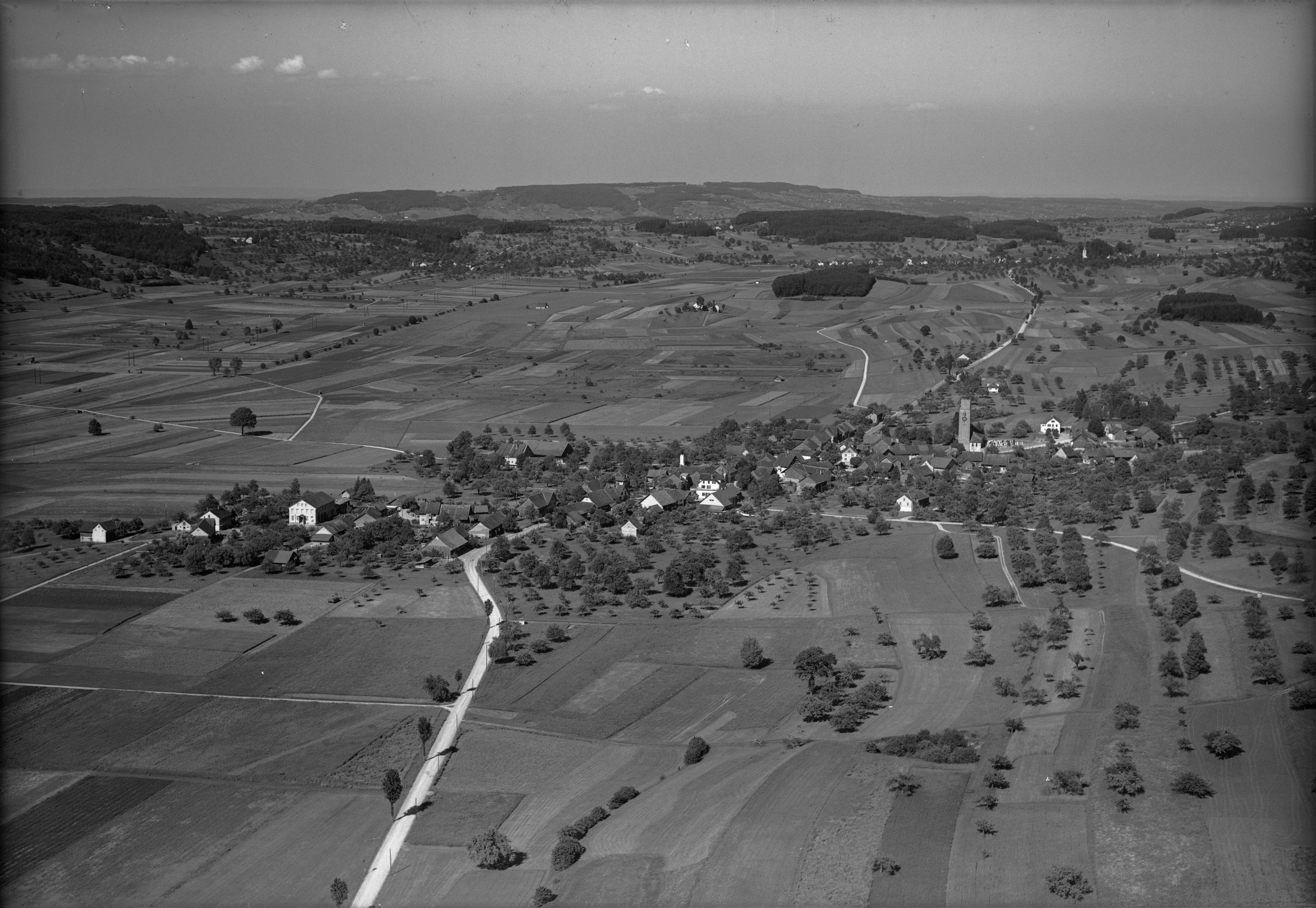
Aerial view (1950)

The village church was probably built in the High Middle Ages and was part of the parish of Affeltrangen. A priest is first mentioned in the church in 1214. In 1529, the village converted to the new faith during the Protestant Reformation. However, the local lord was able to re-institute the Mass in 1532. The Reformed members were part of the parish of Matzingen until 1961. The church was used as a shared church from 1648 to 1966.

The main economic activities were farming and vineyards (until 1900) and peat extraction (until 1918). A mill was built in 1625, along with a sawmill. Between 1810 and 1839 there was a cotton mill in Lauchetal, followed by an embroidery factory in 1900 and a shoe factory in 1933. The land improvement of 1918 strengthened the dairy industry. At the beginning of the 21st Century the major industries in Lommis included construction, light industry (including timber, aircraft electronics) and, since 1962, airport jobs. After 1970 the town's population grew rapidly.

== Geography ==
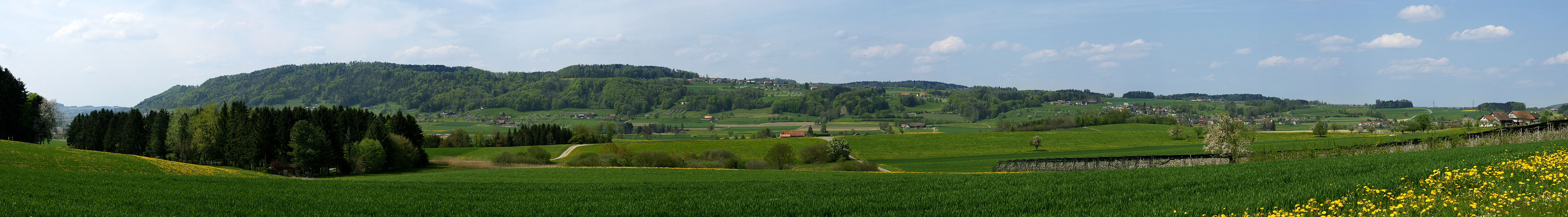
View of the Lauche valley

Lommis has an area, as of 2009, of 8.6 square kilometers (3.3 sq mi). Of this area, 5.4 km^{2} (2.1 sq mi) or 62.8% is used for agricultural purposes, while 2.3 km^{2} (0.89 sq mi) or 26.7% is forested. Of the rest of the land, 0.73 km^{2} (0.28 sq mi) or 8.5% is settled (buildings or roads), 0.06 km^{2} (15 acres) or 0.7% is either rivers or lakes and 0.14 km^{2} (35 acres) or 1.6% is unproductive land.

Of the built up area, industrial buildings made up 4.9% of the total area while housing and buildings made up 0.5% and transportation infrastructure made up 0.5%. while parks, green belts and sports fields made up 2.6%. Out of the forested land, 25.6% of the total land area is heavily forested and 1.2% is covered with orchards or small clusters of trees. Of the agricultural land, 58.8% is used for growing crops, while 4.0% is used for orchards or vine crops. Of the water in the municipality, 0.2% is in lakes and 0.5% is in rivers and streams.

The municipality is located in the Münchwilen district, in the Lauche valley near Matzingen. It consists of the villages of Lommis, Kalthäusern and Weingarten. The former municipality of Lommis existed between 1803–1994 and consisted of the Bürgergemeinden of Lommis, Bettwiesen and Wetzikon (TG). In 1995, the Bürgergemeinde of Lommis merged with Weingarten to form the new municipality of Lommis.

== Demographics ==
Lommis has a population (as of December 2020) of 1,243 As of 2008, 9.0% of the population are foreign nationals. Over the last 10 years (1997–2007) the population has changed at a rate of 9.3%. Most of the population (as of 2000) speaks German(94.3%), with Italian being second most common (2.1%) and Albanian being third (1.1%).

As of 2008, the gender distribution of the population was 49.4% male and 50.6% female. The population was made up of 474 Swiss men (44.3% of the population), and 55 (5.1%) non-Swiss men. There were 500 Swiss women (46.7%), and 41 (3.8%) non-Swiss women.

In 2008 there were 6 live births to Swiss citizens and 1 birth to non-Swiss citizens, and in same time span there were 3 deaths of Swiss citizens. Ignoring immigration and emigration, the population of Swiss citizens increased by 3 while the foreign population increased by 1. There were 1 Swiss woman who emigrated from Switzerland to another country, 9 non-Swiss men who emigrated from Switzerland to another country and 5 non-Swiss women who emigrated from Switzerland to another country. The total Swiss population change in 2008 (from all sources) was an increase of 9 and the non-Swiss population change was an increase of 12 people. This represents a population growth rate of 2.0%.

The age distribution, as of 2009, in Lommis is; 117 children or 10.8% of the population are between 0 and 9 years old and 191 teenagers or 17.6% are between 10 and 19. Of the adult population, 108 people or 9.9% of the population are between 20 and 29 years old. 109 people or 10.0% are between 30 and 39, 237 people or 21.8% are between 40 and 49, and 160 people or 14.7% are between 50 and 59. The senior population distribution is 90 people or 8.3% of the population are between 60 and 69 years old, 50 people or 4.6% are between 70 and 79, there are 20 people or 1.8% who are between 80 and 89, and there are 4 people or 0.4% who are 90 and older.

As of 2000, there were 354 private households in the municipality, and an average of 2.7 persons per household. In 2000 there were 184 single family homes (or 87.6% of the total) out of a total of 210 inhabited buildings. There were 14 two family buildings (6.7%), 3 three family buildings (1.4%) and 9 multi-family buildings (or 4.3%). There were 173 (or 18.0%) persons who were part of a couple without children, and 615 (or 63.9%) who were part of a couple with children. There were 36 (or 3.7%) people who lived in single parent home, while there are 4 persons who were adult children living with one or both parents, 6 persons who lived in a household made up of relatives, 8 who lived in a household made up of unrelated persons, and 22 who are either institutionalized or live in another type of collective housing.

The vacancy rate for the municipality, in 2008, was 2.4%. As of 2007, the construction rate of new housing units was 1 new units per 1000 residents. In 2000 there were 378 apartments in the municipality. The most common apartment size was the 5 room apartment of which there were 119. There were 4 single room apartments and 90 apartments with six or more rooms. As of 2000 the average price to rent an average apartment in Lommis was 1148.55 Swiss francs (CHF) per month (US$920, £520, €740 approx. exchange rate from 2000). The average rate for a one-room apartment was 410.00 CHF (US$330, £180, €260), a two-room apartment was about 862.22 CHF (US$690, £390, €550), a three-room apartment was about 931.19 CHF (US$740, £420, €600) and a six or more room apartment cost an average of 1572.00 CHF (US$1260, £710, €1010). The average apartment price in Lommis was 102.9% of the national average of 1116 CHF.

In the 2007 federal election the most popular party was the SVP which received 53.57% of the vote. The next three most popular parties were the CVP (15.49%), the FDP (9.8%) and the Green Party (9.66%). In the federal election, a total of 373 votes were cast, and the voter turnout was 52.1%.

The historical population is given in the following table:

Year	Population Lommis	Population Kalthäusern
1850	356	102
1900	341	79
1950	350	63
1990	487	58
Year	Population, Lommis	
2000	962	

== Economy ==
As of 2007, Lommis had an unemployment rate of 0.87%. As of 2005, there were 77 people employed in the primary economic sector and about 35 businesses involved in this sector. 163 people are employed in the secondary sector and there are 17 businesses in this sector. 82 people are employed in the tertiary sector, with 30 businesses in this sector. In 2000 there were 664 workers who lived in the municipality. Of these, 308 or about 46.4% of the residents worked outside Lommis while 169 people commuted into the municipality for work. There were a total of 525 jobs (of at least 6 hours per week) in the municipality. Of the working population, 4.8% used public transportation to get to work, and 58.1% used a private car.

== Religion ==
From the 2000 census, 405 or 42.1% were Roman Catholic, while 388 or 40.3% belonged to the Swiss Reformed Church. Of the rest of the population, there are 2 individuals (or about 0.21% of the population) who belong to the Orthodox Church, and there are 52 individuals (or about 5.41% of the population) who belong to another Christian church. There was 1 individual who was Jewish, and 10 (or about 1.04% of the population) who are Islamic. There are 1 individuals (or about 0.10% of the population) who belong to another church (not listed on the census), 78 (or about 8.11% of the population) belong to no church, are agnostic or atheist, and 25 individuals (or about 2.60% of the population) did not answer the question.

== Education ==
In Lommis about 71.8% of the population (between age 25–64) have completed either non-mandatory upper secondary education or additional higher education (either university or a Fachhochschule).

Lommis is home to the Lommis primary school district. In the 2008/2009 school year there were 126 students. There were 25 children in the kindergarten, and the average class size was 12.5 kindergartners. Of the children in kindergarten, 14 or 56.0% were female, 2 or 8.0% were not Swiss citizens and 2 or 8.0% did not speak German natively. The lower and upper primary levels begin at about age 5-6 and last for 6 years. There were 50 children in who were at the lower primary level and 51 children in the upper primary level. The average class size in the primary school was 20.2 students. At the lower primary level, there were 31 children or 62.0% of the total population who were female, 7 or 14.0% were not Swiss citizens and 7 or 14.0% did not speak German natively. In the upper primary level, 24 or 47.1% were female, 3 or 5.9% were not Swiss citizens and 3 or 5.9% did not speak German natively.
