= Bochmann =

Bochmann is a German surname. Notable people with the surname include:

- Annika Bochmann (born 1991), German sailor
- Georg Bochmann (1913–1973), German SS officer
- Gregor von Bochmann (1850–1930), Baltic-German painter
- Gregor von Bochmann (computer scientist) (born 1941), German-Canadian computer scientist
- Manfred Bochmann (1928–2011), East German politician
- René Bochmann (born 1969), German politician
- Werner Bochmann (1900–1993), German composer

== See also ==
- Bochman
