= S.A. Bachman =

American artist (born 1957)

- Born: Columbus, Ohio, United States
- Known for: Visual art, activism, education
- Movement: Artist-activist collaborative

S.A. Bachman (born 1957) is socially engaged artist, activist, and educator. Her work unites visual culture and direct action to challenge capitalism, colonialism, and carceral logic.She is the cofounder of two artist collaboratives, THINK AGAIN and LOUDER THAN WORDS, both of which recruit creative practice as a catalyst for public address and political resistance. Working at the intersection of art and social justice, Bachman examines how white supremacy, economic inequality, misogyny, and mass media conspire to endanger those most impacted by systemic injustice. Her recent work focuses on violence against women, the plight of immigrants, LGBTQ+ equality, the exploitation of non-human animals, prison abolition, and Palestinian liberation. Her interdisciplinary practice utilizes photomontage, mobile billboards, outdoor projection, moving image, and offset printing.

Bachman's work has been exhibited at the Museu d’Art Contemporani de Barcelona, the Philadelphia Museum of Art, the Institute of Contemporary Art (Boston and Philadelphia), and the Rose Art Museum, with works in the collections of Los Angeles County Museum of Art, the Palacio de Bellas Artes in Mexico City, and the Center for the Study of Political Graphics. A recipient of fellowships and awards from the National Endowment for the Arts, the Massachusetts Cultural Council, and the New England Foundation for the Arts, Bachman's art has been reviewed in Artforum, Ms., and Social Text. Her photographs and interventionist projects have been published in numerous books, including Reframings: NewAmerican Feminist Photographies, Graphic Agitation 2, and Peace Signs: The Anti-War Movement Illustrated.

Her most recent book, Art of Defiance: Protest Graphics and Poetry for Palestine, is released July 14, 2025.

== Collaboratives ==
THINK AGAIN Main article: Think Again THINK AGAIN (1997–2010) is an artist-activist collaborative founded in 1997 by S.A. Bachman and David John Attyah. THINK AGAIN expects something political from art and uses images to challenge indifference. The collaborative views cultural work as essential to affecting social change and engaging people in the political process. Their work — mobile billboards, outdoor projections, guerilla interventions, digital murals, and viral poster campaigns — links the global to the local and combines cultural theory, sociological research, and activism to create a visual language for activating civic dialogue. The projects of THINK AGAIN explore a unique range of issues including queer liberation, economic inequality, state sanctioned violence, undocumented labor, the treatment of immigrants, racism, militarization, gentrification, displacement, and gender parity. AGAIN's early work is documented in the monograph, A Brief History of Outrage.

Many of THINK AGAIN's projects privilege face-to-face interactions. Attyah and Bachman park mobile billboards in front of City Halls and grocery stores, hand out posters at Pride parades and protests, and distribute books and posters to activists mobilizing against injustice. As part of its mission, the collaborative dispenses all of its printed matter free-of-charge through grassroots community organizations, art spaces, unions, academic institutions, and the internet. [1][2]

LOUDER THAN WORDS In 2013, Bachman and Neda Moridpour co-founded the activist art collective LOUDER THAN WORDS, a cross-cultural, intergenerational art collective that targets sexual assault, domestic violence, LGBTQ equality, animal liberation, mass incarceration, and Palestinian liberation. They enlist art in the service of public address and social action while examining the ways misogyny and capitalism endanger women, non-human animals, and the disenfranchised. Their projects engage multiple aesthetic strategies including outdoor projection, mobile billboards, round-table workshops, offset printing, video, and photography to address the insidiousness of sexism, discrimination, inequality, and white privilege. Recent projects target sexual assault, domestic violence, women and migration, LGBTQ equality, and prison reform.[3] LOUDER THAN WORDS strives to ignite civic dialogue, unravel obstacles, and reorder entrenched cultural gridlock.

The 2017 project Women On the Move addresses sexual assault, harassment, and domestic violence. The Louder Than Words collaborative converted a 26-foot truck into a mobile billboard and resource center to address sexual violence. The project emphasizes the particular challenges faced by different demographics as a result of sexual violence.

== Photographic work ==
Bachman's photographs analyze conventional female roles within the familial structure and, by implication, the patriarchal culture at large. Through a confluence of image appropriation, language and monumental scale, she examines the correspondence between fact and fiction and the deceptive demarcation of public and private. Through deft manipulation of popular imagery — from suburban malaise to decontextualized advertising — Bachman turns seemingly innocuous yet insidiously offensive visuals against themselves, exposing sexism, white privilege, social conformity, and the politics of representation. Her photographs disclose consumer appetite and the denial of dysfunction as underlying the mass media's construction of family in the United States. Bachman attacks the vicious cycle in which the media, once having established this false norm, projects it back onto the family realm as a model for behavior, expectation and desire.
