= Stettfurt =

Municipality in northern Switzerland

- Municipality
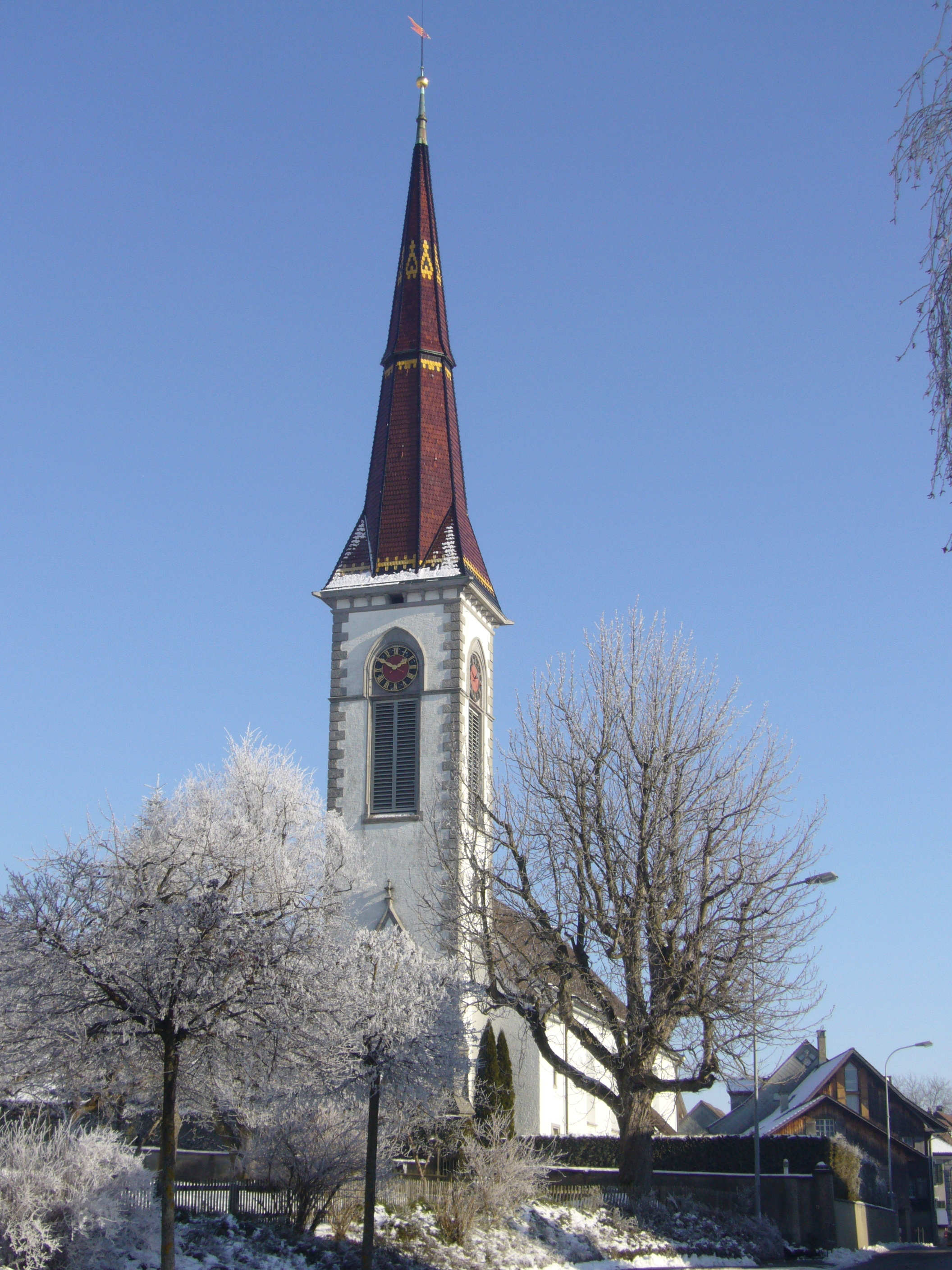

- Coat of arms
- Location of Stettfurt
- Location within Switzerland Location within Canton of Thurgau
- Coordinates: 47°31′N 8°57′E
- Country: Switzerland
- Canton: Thurgau
- District: Frauenfeld

Area
  - Total: 6.36 km^{2} (2.46 sq mi)
- Elevation: 475 m (1,558 ft)

Population (December 2007)
  - Total: 1,098
  - Density: 173/km^{2} (447/sq mi)
- Time zone: UTC+01:00 (CET)
  - Summer (DST): UTC+02:00 (CEST)
- Postal code: 9507
- SFOS number: 4606
- ISO 3166 code: CH-TG
- Surrounded by: Lommis, Matzingen, Thundorf, Wängi
- Website: www.stettfurt.ch

Stettfurt is a municipality in the district of Frauenfeld in the canton of Thurgau in Switzerland.

== History ==
Stettfurt is first mentioned in 827 as Stetivurt. Until 1817, it was part of the municipality of Matzingen. In the 9th century, the Abbey of St. Gall owned property in Stettfurt. In 1228 Diethelm III. von Toggenburg gave Stettfurt to the Commandry of Tobel. The low court of Sonnenberg included Kalthäusern, Ruggenbühl and Stettfurt between the 13th century until 1798.

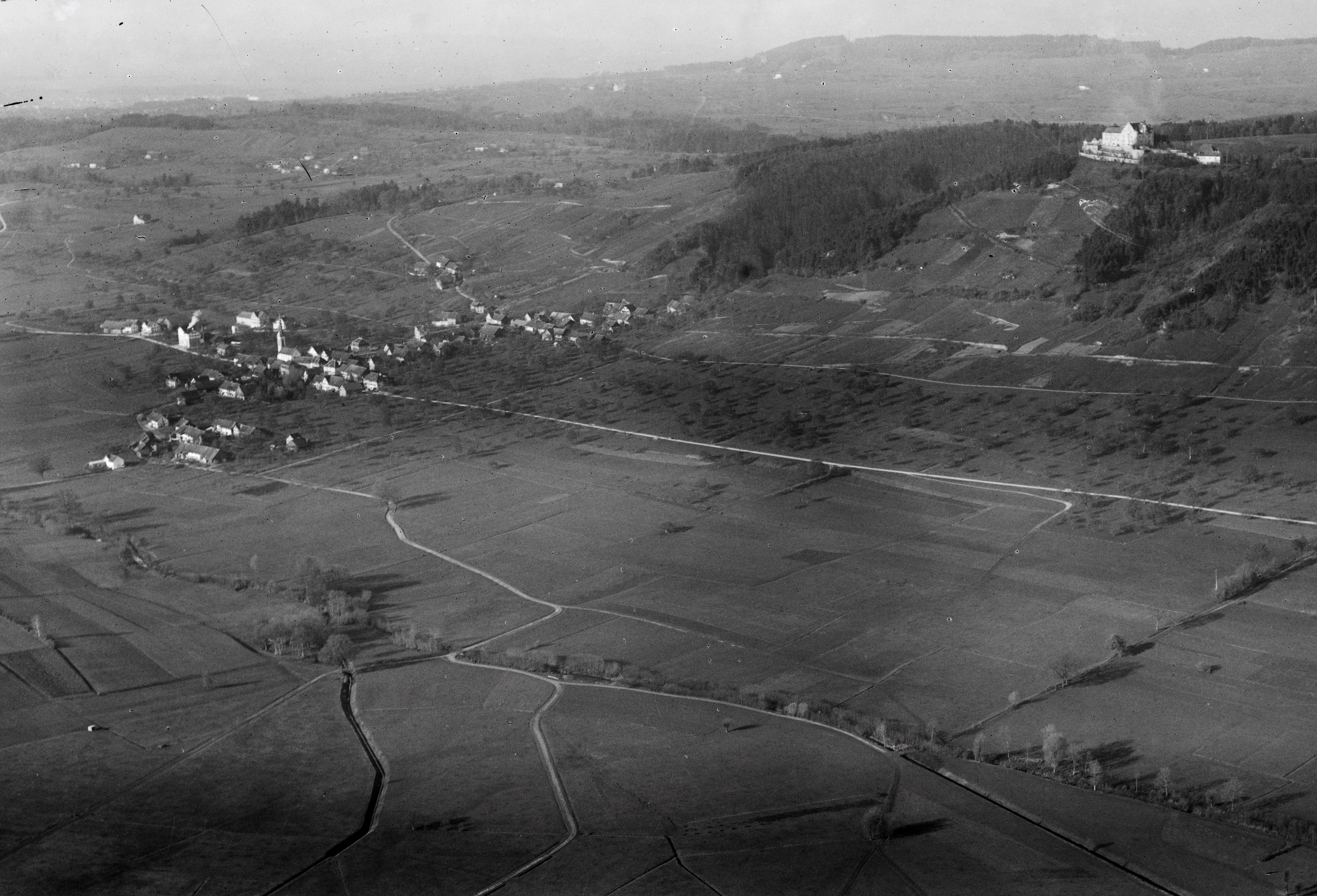
Aerial view from 400 m by Walter Mittelholzer (1923)

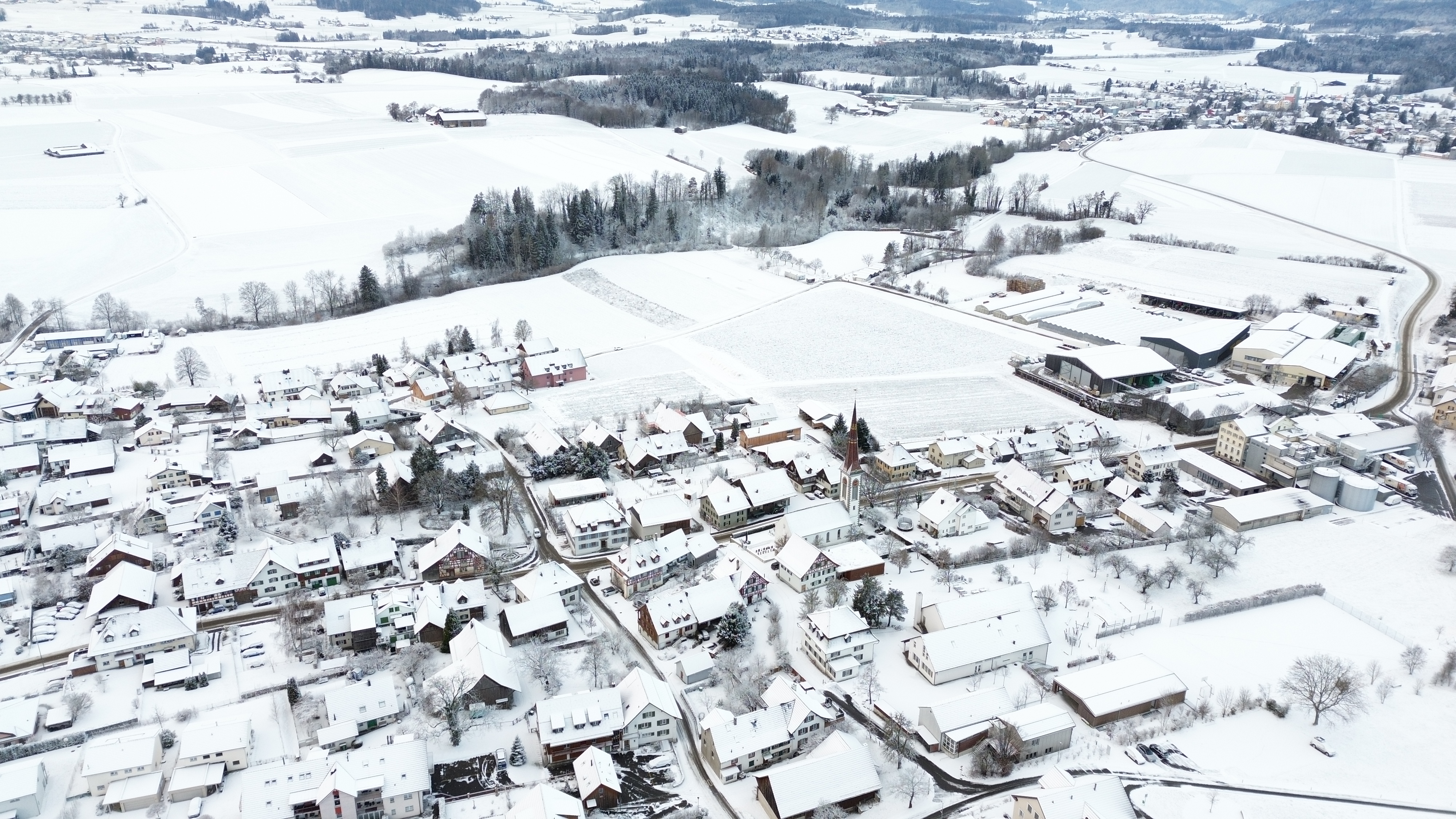
Aerial View From 2026

The village converted completely to the Reformed faith during the Protestant Reformation. It was part of the parish of Wängi until the church was built in 1746 and in 1752 the Stettfurt parish was created.

Until the 19th century, agriculture in the village operated on the Three-field system, along with fruit orchards and (until 1908) vineyards. Starting in 1850 livestock and dairy farming expanded into the village. A cheese factory opened in 1883. The distillery was founded in 1888. A cooperative, the Presshefefabrik Stettfurt, was established in 1902 and converted in 1946 into a corporation. The merger of the yeast factories of Hindelbank and Stettfurt in 1993 created Hefe Schweiz AG, which in 2010 had 32 employees and about 17 million francs in sales.

== Geography ==
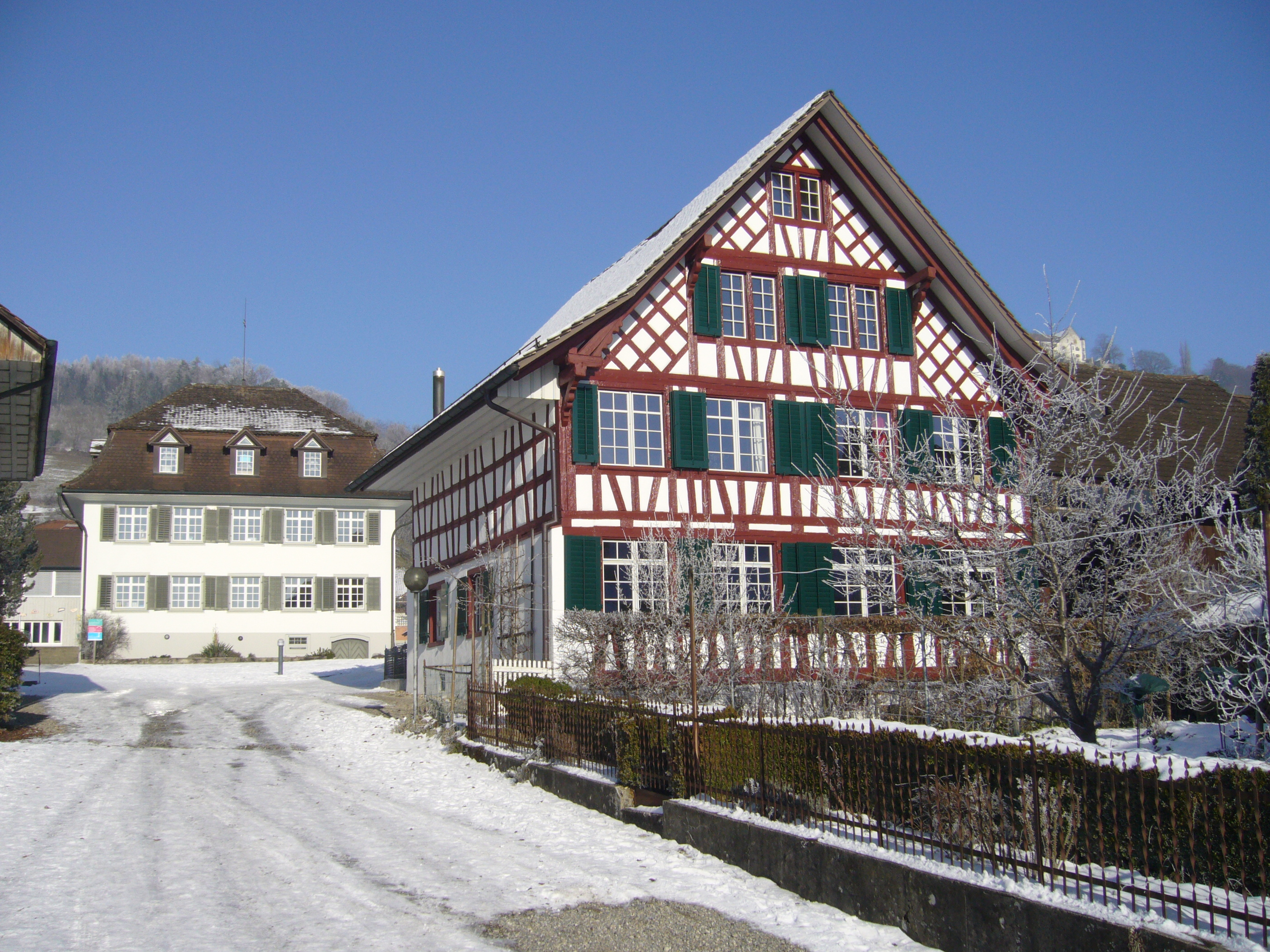
The village of Stettfurt

Stettfurt has an area, as of 2009, of 6.36 square kilometers (2.46 sq mi). Of this area, 4.21 km^{2} (1.63 sq mi) or 66.2% is used for agricultural purposes, while 1.59 km^{2} (0.61 sq mi) or 25.0% is forested. Of the rest of the land, 0.49 km^{2} (0.19 sq mi) or 7.7% is settled (buildings or roads), 0.02 km^{2} (4.9 acres) or 0.3% is either rivers or lakes.

Of the built up area, industrial buildings made up 4.4% of the total area while housing and buildings made up 0.0% and transportation infrastructure made up 0.5%. while parks, green belts and sports fields made up 2.7%. Out of the forested land, 23.4% of the total land area is heavily forested and 1.6% is covered with orchards or small clusters of trees. Of the agricultural land, 63.7% is used for growing crops, while 2.5% is used for orchards or vine crops. All the water in the municipality is flowing water.

The municipality is located in the Frauenfeld district, on the southern foot of Immenberg mountain.

== Demographics ==
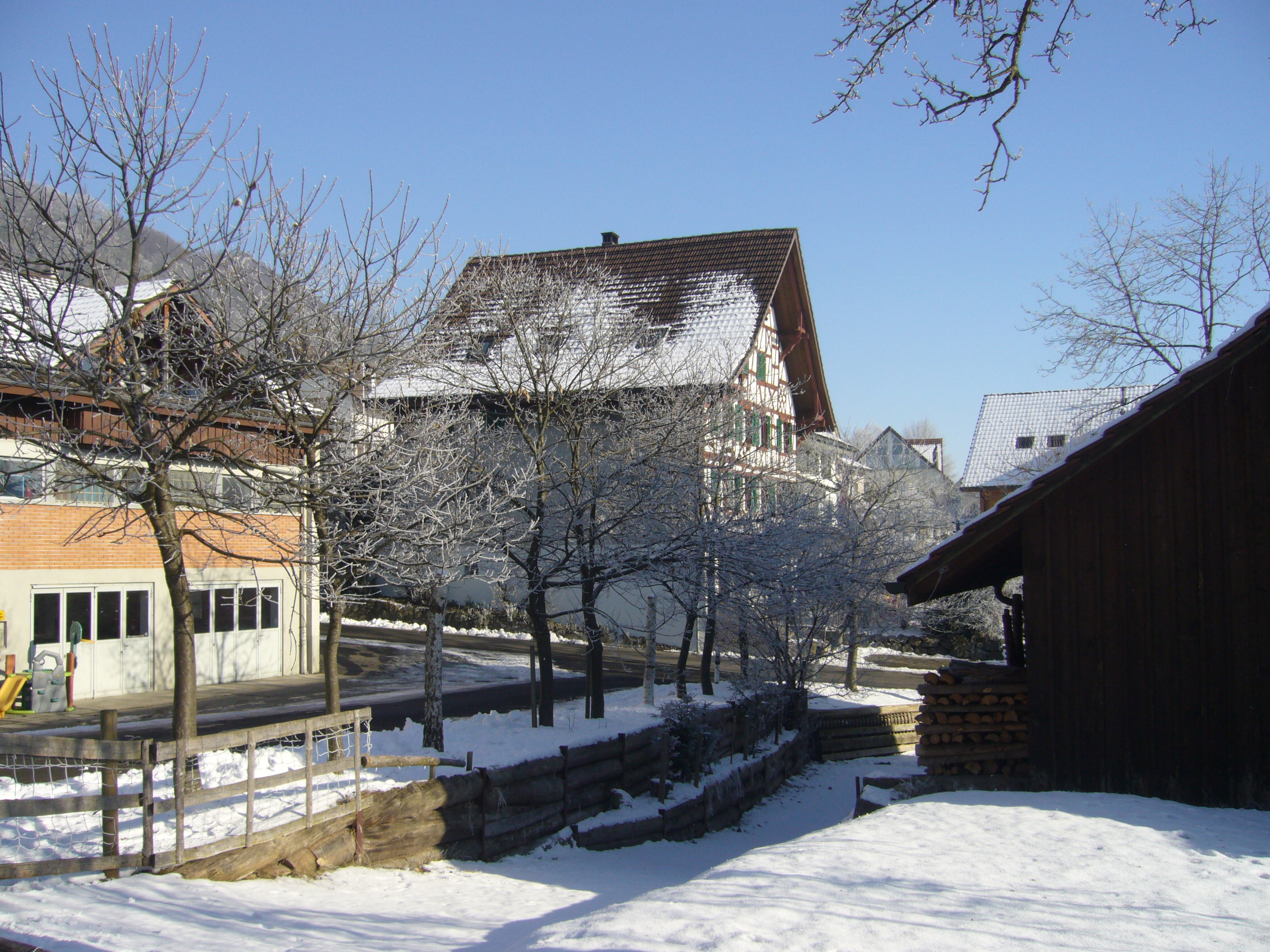
Houses in Stettfurt

Stettfurt has a population (as of December 2020) of 1,216. As of 2008, 5.6% of the population are foreign nationals. Over the last 10 years (1997–2007) the population has changed at a rate of 25.1%. Most of the population (as of 2000) speaks German (97.2%), with Portuguese being second most common ( 0.9%) and Italian being third ( 0.4%).

As of 2008, the gender distribution of the population was 49.6% male and 50.4% female. The population was made up of 527 Swiss men (47.2% of the population), and 27 (2.4%) non-Swiss men. There were 528 Swiss women (47.3%), and 35 (3.1%) non-Swiss women.

In 2008 there were 11 live births to Swiss citizens and 1 birth to non-Swiss citizens, and in same time span there were 3 deaths of Swiss citizens. Ignoring immigration and emigration, the population of Swiss citizens increased by 8 while the foreign population increased by 1. There were 3 Swiss women who emigrated from Switzerland to another country, and 2 non-Swiss women who emigrated from Switzerland to another country. The total Swiss population change in 2008 (from all sources) was an increase of 12 and the non-Swiss population change was a decrease of 7 people. This represents a population growth rate of 0.4%.

The age distribution, as of 2009, in Stettfurt is; 153 children or 13.9% of the population are between 0 and 9 years old and 149 teenagers or 13.6% are between 10 and 19. Of the adult population, 91 people or 8.3% of the population are between 20 and 29 years old. 130 people or 11.8% are between 30 and 39, 226 people or 20.6% are between 40 and 49, and 175 people or 15.9% are between 50 and 59. The senior population distribution is 101 people or 9.2% of the population are between 60 and 69 years old, 38 people or 3.5% are between 70 and 79, there are 32 people or 2.9% who are between 80 and 89, and there are 4 people or 0.4% who are 90 and older.

As of 2000, there were 356 private households in the municipality, and an average of 2.7 persons per household. In 2000 there were 216 single family homes (or 87.1% of the total) out of a total of 248 inhabited buildings. There were 22 two family buildings (8.9%), 6 three family buildings (2.4%) and 4 multi-family buildings (or 1.6%). There were 199 (or 20.5%) persons who were part of a couple without children, and 633 (or 65.2%) who were part of a couple with children. There were 37 (or 3.8%) people who lived in single parent home, while there are 2 persons who were adult children living with one or both parents, 3 persons who lived in a household made up of relatives, 5 who lived in a household made up of unrelated persons, and 9 who are either institutionalized or live in another type of collective housing.

The vacancy rate for the municipality, in 2008, was 0.24%. As of 2007, the construction rate of new housing units was 4.5 new units per 1000 residents. In 2000 there were 368 apartments in the municipality. The most common apartment size was the 5 room apartment of which there were 113. There were 2 single room apartments and 111 apartments with six or more rooms.

In the 2007 federal election the most popular party was the SVP which received 43.62% of the vote. The next three most popular parties were the CVP (19.28%), the FDP (12.34%) and the Green Party (11.35%). In the federal election, a total of 451 votes were cast, and the voter turnout was 57.4%.

The historical population is given in the following table:

year	population
1880	406
1900	425
1950	443
1980	552
1990	710
2000	971

== Heritage sites of national significance ==
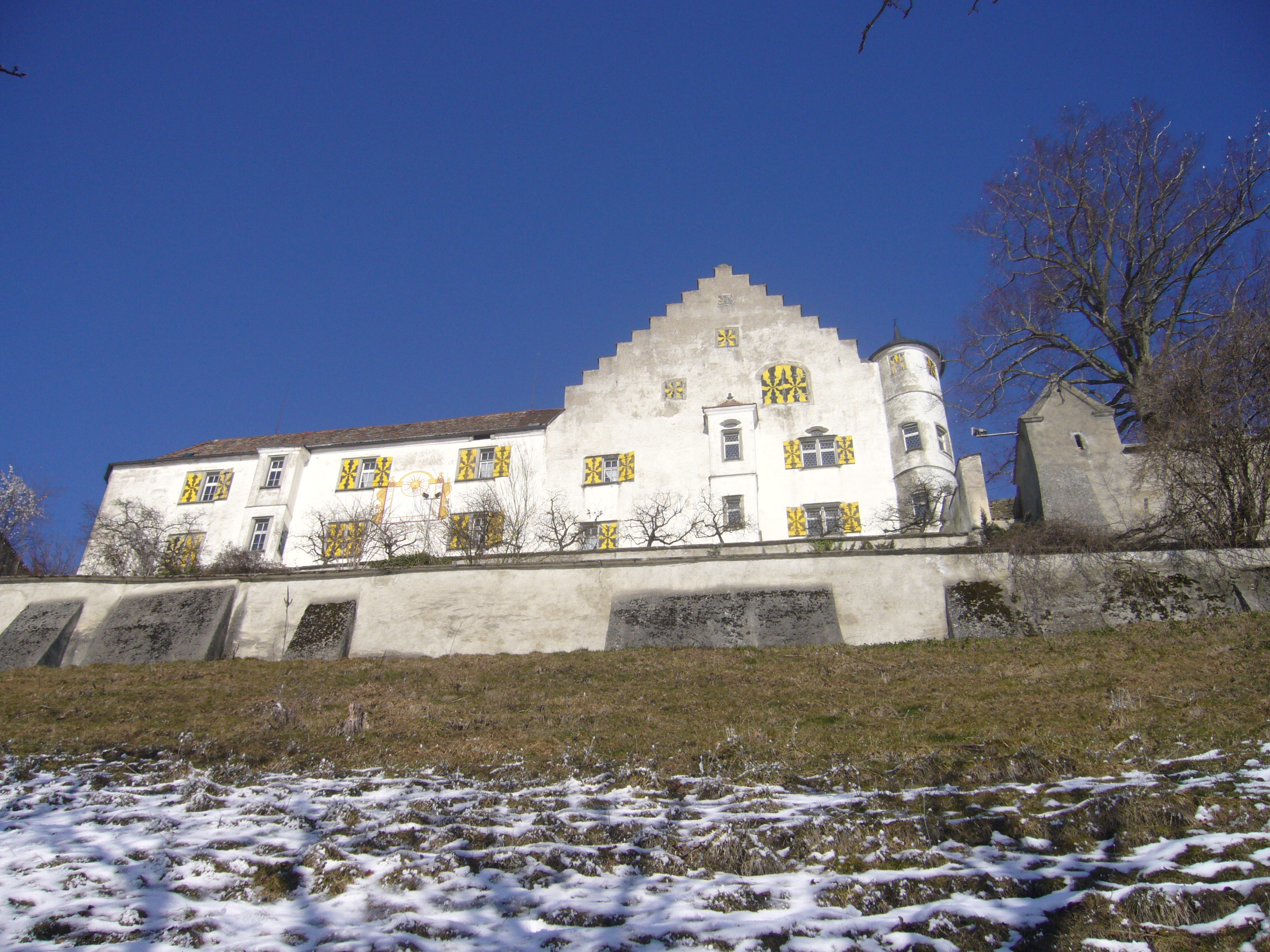
Sonnenberg Castle

Sonnenberg Castle is listed as a Swiss heritage site of national significance. The entire village of Stettfurt is listed as part of the Inventory of Swiss Heritage Sites.

== Economy ==
As of 2007, Stettfurt had an unemployment rate of 0.77%. As of 2005, there were 109 people employed in the primary economic sector and about 16 businesses involved in this sector. 58 people are employed in the secondary sector and there are 13 businesses in this sector. 78 people are employed in the tertiary sector, with 27 businesses in this sector.

In 2000 there were 709 workers who lived in the municipality. Of these, 406 or about 57.3% of the residents worked outside Stettfurt while 83 people commuted into the municipality for work. There were a total of 386 jobs (of at least 6 hours per week) in the municipality. Of the working population, 8.7% used public transportation to get to work, and 58.1% used a private car.

== Religion ==
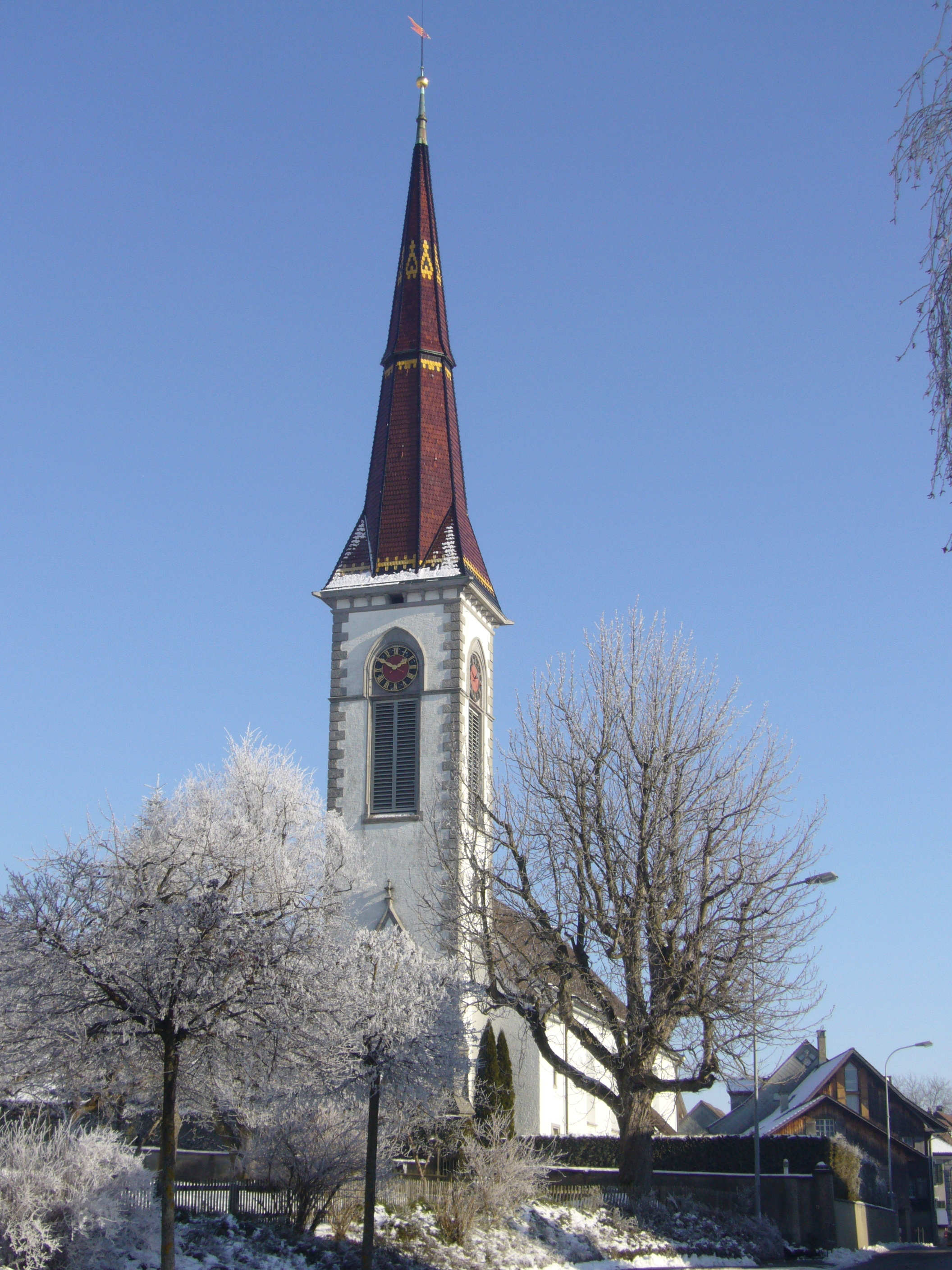
Church in Stettfurt

From the 2000 census, 301 or 31.0% were Roman Catholic, while 521 or 53.7% belonged to the Swiss Reformed Church. Of the rest of the population, and there are 25 individuals (or about 2.57% of the population) who belong to another Christian church. There were 2 (or about 0.21% of the population) who are Islamic. There are 1 individuals (or about 0.10% of the population) who belong to another church (not listed on the census), 92 (or about 9.47% of the population) belong to no church, are agnostic or atheist, and 29 individuals (or about 2.99% of the population) did not answer the question.

== Education ==
In Stettfurt about 85.7% of the population (between age 25 and 64) have completed either non-mandatory upper secondary education or additional higher education (either university or a Fachhochschule).

Stettfurt is home to the Stettfurt primary school district. In the 2008/2009 school year there were 131 students. There were 38 children in the kindergarten, and the average class size was 19 kindergartners. Of the children in kindergarten, 20 or 52.6% are female. The lower and upper primary levels begin at about age 5-6 and last for 6 years. There were 49 children who were at the lower primary level and 44 children in the upper primary level. The average class size in the primary school was 23.25 students. At the lower primary level, there were 25 children or 51.0% of the total population who are female and 1 or 2.0% are not Swiss citizens. In the upper primary level, there were 16 or 36.4% who are female.
