= René Backmann =

French journalist and author (1944–2026)

- Backmann in 2021
- Born: 24 February 1944; Saint-Étienne, German-occupied France
- Died: 29 January 2026 (aged 81)
- Occupations: Journalist and author
- Employer: Le Nouvel Observateur
- Notable work: A Wall in Palestine

René Backmann (24 February 1944 – 29 January 2026) was a French journalist known for international reporting at Le Nouvel Observateur and later for his columns at Mediapart, with work focusing on the Middle East and on questions of rights and humanitarian crises. He was the author of Un mur en Palestine and the English-language A Wall in Palestine, a reported study of the West Bank barrier that drew notice in the French and Anglophone press. His distinctions include the Mumm Foundation Prize for journalism, cited for an investigation into the financing of Islamist movements.

== Early life ==
Backmann was born on 24 February 1944 in Saint-Romain-le-Puy, Auvergne-Rhône-Alpes, France, to a working-class family. He grew up in Saint-Etienne.

== Career ==
Backmann spent more than 40 years as an investigative reporter and foreign correspondent at Le Nouvel Observateur, ultimately serving as editor in chief of the weekly's foreign desk. His reporting gravitated to international affairs and especially the Arab–Israeli conflict, a focus reflected in his 2006 book Un mur en Palestine, published in Paris by Fayard, and in the English edition A Wall in Palestine published by Picador in 2010. In recognition of his investigative work he received the Mumm Prize for journalism.

He wrote regularly for Mediapart and contributed long-form columns and interviews on Israel, Palestine and regional politics. His analysis also appeared in periodicals such as Confluences Méditerranée, where he published essays on civil military relations in Israel and debates about the role of religion in the army. Earlier in his career, he contributed to the Revue d'études palestiniennes, the French series of the Institute for Palestine Studies.

== Death ==
Backmann died on 29 January 2026, at the age of 81.

== Books ==
- A Wall in Palestine
