= Walter Bachman =

Walter Bachman may refer to:

- Walter C. Bachman (1911–1991), American ship designer and marine engineer
- Walter E. Bachman (1879–1958), American college football player and coach

== See also ==
- Walter Bachmann (born 1949), Swiss sailor
