= Bill Bachman =

American musician

Bill Bachman is an American percussionist and music educator. Bachman has worked with several drum corps including The Cadets, Blue Knights, Carolina Crown, and the Magic of Orlando, among others. He studied at Berklee College of Music and the University of North Texas.

Bachman is an author of marching percussion literature and maintains a website called DrumWorkout.com which specializes in developing rudimental percussion technique. He is known for his Logic series which includes books on rudiments, marching bass drums, and marching tenor drums.
