= John Baughman =

American serial killer

John E. Baughman
- Baughman being escorted from his garage by his neighbors in 1984
- Born: John Earl Baughman; October 4, 1941; Illinois, U.S.
- Died: May 31, 2000 (aged 58); St. John's, Antigua and Barbuda
- Cause of death: Suicide by hanging
- Status: Deceased
- Conviction: Murder
- Penalty: Death

Details
- Victims: 1–3
- Span of crimes: 1970–1995
- Country: United States, Antigua and Barbuda
- States: Illinois, Antigua
- Date apprehended: May 28, 1995

John Earl Baughman (October 4, 1941 – May 31, 2000) was an American murderer and suspected serial killer. A former police officer, Baughman was acquitted of murdering a close friend and his first wife, before eventually killing his second wife while on a vacation in Antigua and Barbuda. After being sentenced to death for her murder, he hanged himself in prison in 2000, while still on death row.

== Early life ==
John Baughman was born in Illinois and grew up in Chicago. His father, Bill Baughman, worked on the railroad and was originally from Clinton, Illinois. His mother, Letha Smith Baughman, was a bookkeeper who had been orphaned as a young child and whose first child, a male, died as an infant. Baughman was the only other son of his parents, having two elder sisters.

Baughman volunteered for two tours in Vietnam as a Marine infantryman. He later became a heavyset man and had always worn thick-rimmed glasses, which earned him the nickname "Bottles". He once served as a police officer in Homewood. He married his wife Gertrude, nicknamed "Trudy", on July 17, 1964; together they had three daughters. During those years, Baughman worked as a security guard, and did electrical work for Datagraphics and eventually worked at Honeywell. He was described as a rather controlling man.

== Murders ==
=== Sgt. Dean Pence ===
On July 26, 1970, Sgt. Dean Pence, a police officer in Flossmoor, was found murdered near the Prestwick Country Club in Will County. He had been shot with a .38 caliber revolver. A long-time friend of Baughman, then 28, he was presumably killed by the former for being in a suspected affair with John's wife, Trudy.

Despite becoming the lead suspect, with even an arrest and return to Joliet, the grand jury in Will County refused to indict him, and Baughman was allowed to walk free of charges.

=== Trudy Baughman ===
In 1984, Trudy and John were inspecting some camping equipment in their garage in Matteson. According to Baughman, his wife suddenly tripped over a propane stove, which ignited some gasoline and set her on fire. Panicking, Trudy reportedly accidentally injured herself in the throat by crashing into some utility shelves. However, an examination by the coroner proved the story to be false, as the autopsy revealed that Trudy had first been strangled and then subsequently burned. Trudy had recently told Baughman that she wanted a divorce.

During his 1985 trial for the death of his wife, Baughman was acquitted by the Cook County judge of murder.

In 1988, Baughman's attorney, Fred Aprati, was "convicted in federal court of paying bribes to Cook County sheriff's police". It had been testimony by a county coroner who had not examined Trudy's body — and not the head coroner, who had examined her body — that shed doubt on the prosecution's case.

=== Velerie Baughman ===
Years passed following his first wife's suspicious death, and since long before Trudy's death, Baughman had retired from the police force and now worked as a salesman for the Honeywell company. One night, he attended a singles' dance, where he met a twice-divorced woman named Velerie. She was an energetic customer service representative for 3M, for whom she had worked for 22 years, and had four adult children. They took a liking to each other, and in February 1991, the couple married.

Velerie was aware of John's past, but believed the claims that he was innocent, in stark contrast with one of his children. In 1995, the couple went on vacation to St. John's in Antigua and Barbuda, registering at the Royal Antiguan Hotel. Interestingly, employees later testified that Baughman had requested a room for two for the first three nights, but then only a one-person room for the last.

On May 27, Baughman took his wife to the roof of the 8-story hotel, where he pushed her off to her death.

== Trial, sentence and death ==
Immediately after, Baughman was arrested and held without bail in Her Majesty's Prison. During the investigation, he explained that his wife had accidentally fallen while they tossed love letters to each other. The coroner, however, declared that she had been pushed to her death. At his trial, Baughman was quoted as saying that he loved his wife very much, but that did not dissuade the jury, whose unanimous vote found him guilty of murder.

Sentenced to death, Baughman was escorted out of jail, where Antiguans were cursing at him and cheering for his eventual death, without making a final statement. His lawyer, Gerald Watt, accused the court of bias in favor of the prosecutor, and announced that he was appealing the decision. On May 31, 2000, shortly after his final appeal was rejected, Baughman killed himself in the Antiguan jail by hanging by a bed sheet from his cell window bars.

== See also ==
- List of serial killers in the United States
