= Gregor von Bochmann (computer scientist) =

German-Canadian computer scientist

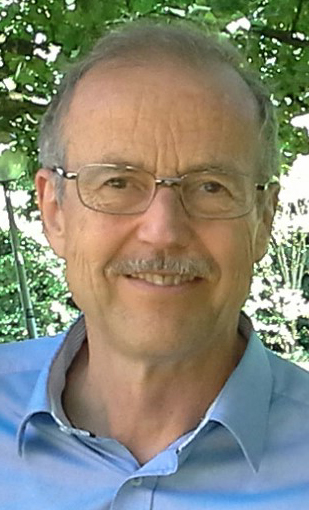
Gregor von Bochmann, 2016

Gregor von Bochmann (born 1941 in Schleswig-Holstein) is a German-Canadian computer scientist and emeritus professor of the Université de Montréal and the University of Ottawa. He is known for his work in the area of protocol engineering and distributed applications.

== Biography ==
Gregor von Bochmann grew up in an artistic family, two of his great-grandfathers being well-known painters (Gregor von Bochmann and Hans Peter Feddersen). From 1952 to 1961, he attended the Johann-Heinrich-Voß-Gymnasium in Eutin. Then he studied physics at the universities of Kiel, Tübingen, Grenoble (France) and München. In between, he studied for one year cello and piano at the Musikhochschule Lübeck. He completed his master's in 1968 with a thesis about his participation in the second muon g-2 experiment at CERN. Then he moved to Canada and completed his PhD in 1971 at McGill University in the field of theoretical high-energy physics. With programming experience in machine, assembler and high-level languages obtained during his work on the master and PhD theses, he used a post-doctoral scholarship from the National Research Council of Canada to get familiar with certain fields of computer science. 1972 he became assistant professor in the computer science department of the Université de Montréal.

His first research topic in computer science was related to neural networks. But soon he moved to the field of compiler construction, and wrote a paper on the description of the semantics of programming languages which was much cited. But in 1975 he moved to the very new field of computer networks and concentrated his efforts on the description, verification and implementation of communication protocols. He wrote a seminal paper on finite state description of protocols and proposed the approach of reachability analysis for the verification of the behavior of distributed systems.

He participated also, in the name of the Canadian government, in the international standardization activities on "Formal Description Techniques for communication protocols and services" that took place in ISO and ITU during the 1980s. He spent a sabbatical year in 1979-80 at Stanford University and in 1986-87 with Siemens in München. From 1989 to 1997, he held the "Industrial Research Chair" on testing communication protocols at the Université de Montréal. He was also a scientific director of the Centre de recherche en informatique de Montréal from 1990 to 1997. During this period, he organized many collaborative research projects with industry and university colleagues.

In 1998 he moved to the University of Ottawa where he was full professor until 2016. During this time, his research covered several areas, such as software engineering for distributed systems, distributed multimedia applications, peer-to-peer systems, control procedures for optical networks, and Internet security.

== Awards and memberships (selection) ==
- 1995: Fellow of the IEEE with the citation "For contributions to the formal specification of protocols for data communications".
- 1995: Honorary doctorat from the University of Grenoble in France
- 1996: Fellow of the ACM
- 1997: Fellow of the Royal Society of Canada
- 2001: Thomas W. Eadie Medal given by the Royal Society of Canada
- 2002: Award for excellence in research from University of Ottawa
- 2008: McNaughton Gold Medal given by IEEE Canada
- 2012: Honorary doctorat from the University of Rennes in France
