= Bøckmann =

Bøckmann is a surname. Notable people with the surname include:

- Carl Wilhelm Bøckmann Barth (1847–1919), Norwegian painter who specialized in marine art
- Jacob Bøckmann Barth (1822–1892), Norwegian forester
- Eduard Bøckmann (1849–1927), Norwegian American ophthalmologist, physician and inventor
- Marcus Olaus Bockman (1849–1942), Norwegian-American Lutheran theologian also recorded as Marcus Olaus Bøckmann
- Nils Christoffer Bøckmann (1880–1973), Norwegian lieutenant-colonel and businessperson
- Peter Wilhelm Kreydahl Bøckmann (1851–1926), Norwegian bishop and theologian
