= Ray Baughman =

American chemist and nanotechnologist (1943–2025)

Ray H. Baughman
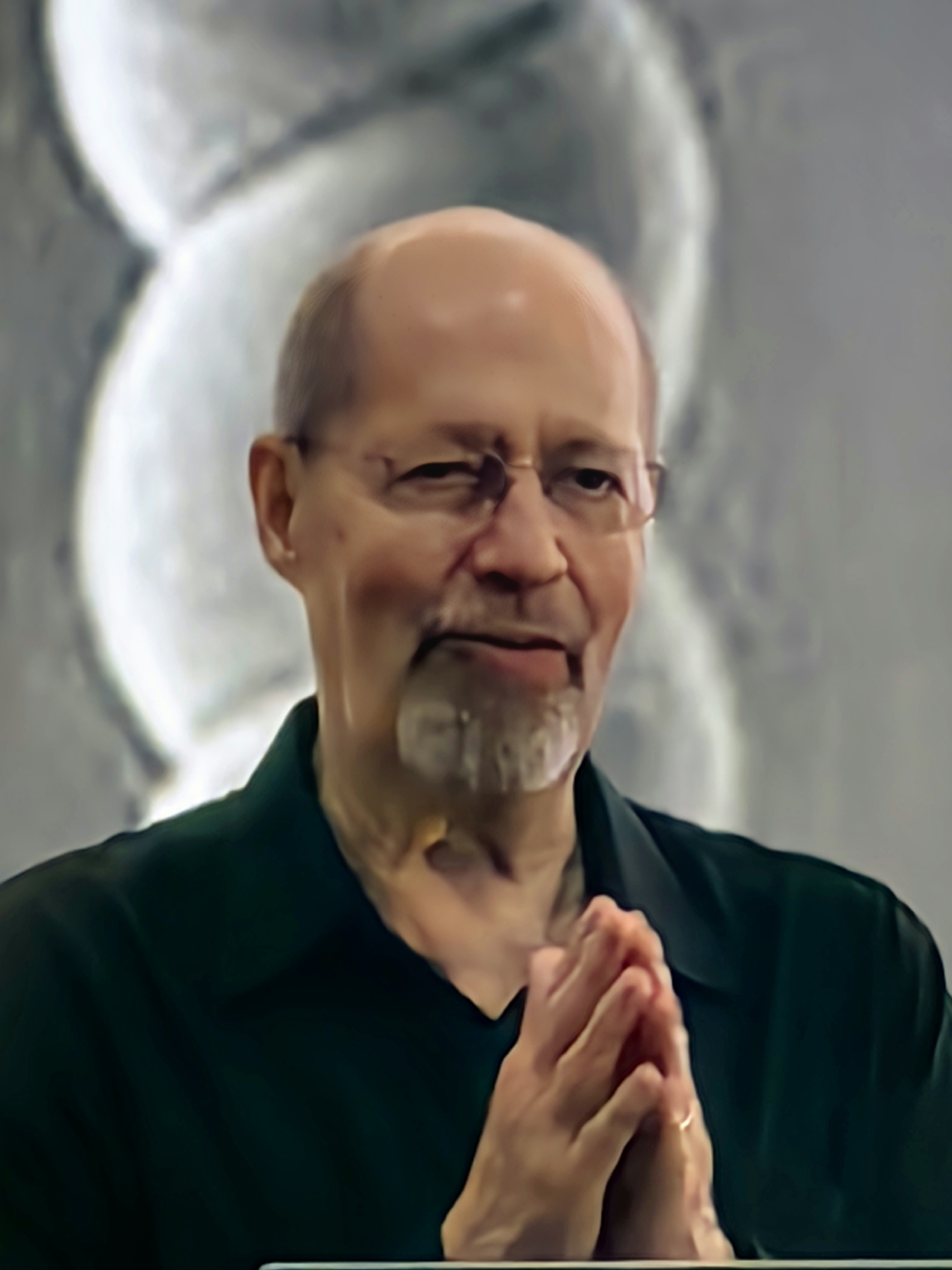
- Baughman in 2024
- Born: January 14, 1943; United States
- Died: April 18, 2025 (aged 82)
- Education: Carnegie Mellon University (B.S.); Harvard University (Ph.D.)
- Known for: Artificial muscles, Carbon nanotube materials
- Awards: Member of the National Academy of Engineering (2008); Fellow of the Royal Society of Chemistry; Fellow of the American Physical Society; Fellow of the National Academy of Inventors; Chemical Pioneer Award (1995); Scientific American 50 (2006); Time Magazine's 50 Best Inventions (2011); Tech Titans Technology Inventors Award (2015)
- Scientific career
- Fields: Chemistry, Nanotechnology, Materials science
- Workplaces: University of Texas at Dallas

Ray H. Baughman (January 14, 1943 – April 18, 2025) was an American chemist and nanotechnologist renowned for his pioneering work in artificial muscles and carbon nanotube-based materials. He held the Robert A. Welch Distinguished Chair in Chemistry and served as the Director of the Alan G. MacDiarmid NanoTech Institute at the University of Texas at Dallas (UT Dallas).

== Early life and education ==
Baughman earned his Bachelor of Science degree in physics from Carnegie Mellon University in 1964. He then pursued a Ph.D. in materials science at Harvard University, completing his doctorate in 1971.

== Career ==
After completing his education, Baughman spent over three decades in industry, primarily with Allied Chemical (later AlliedSignal and Honeywell). There, he held positions ranging from Staff Scientist to Corporate Fellow. In 2001, he transitioned to academia, joining UT Dallas where he led efforts in nanotechnology research and education.

== Research ==
Baughman's research focused on nanoscale materials and their applications in energy, sensing, and actuation. His major contributions include:

- Artificial muscles: He developed materials that mimic muscle behavior, with uses in robotics and biomedicine.
- Carbon nanotube yarns and sheets: His laboratory pioneered methods for spinning nanotubes into high-performance fibers.
- Energy systems: He contributed to technologies for energy harvesting, storage, and conversion using nanostructured materials.

He held over 100 U.S. patents and authored more than 480 peer-reviewed publications.

== Death ==
Baughman died on April 18, 2025, at the age of 82.

== Honors and awards ==
- Elected to the National Academy of Engineering (2008)
- Chemical Pioneer Award from the American Institute of Chemists (1995)
- Named to Scientific American 50 (2006)
- Listed in Time Magazine's 50 Best Inventions (2011)
- Fellow of the Royal Society of Chemistry
- Fellow of the American Physical Society
- Fellow of the National Academy of Inventors
- Tech Titans Technology Inventors Award (2015)

== Educational outreach ==
Baughman founded the NanoExplorers program at UT Dallas, which introduces high-school students to advanced research in nanoscience.
