= Baughman Center =

Two buildings at the University of Florida, Florida, U.S.

Coordinates: 29.642078°N 82.363636°W

- Baughman Meditation Center
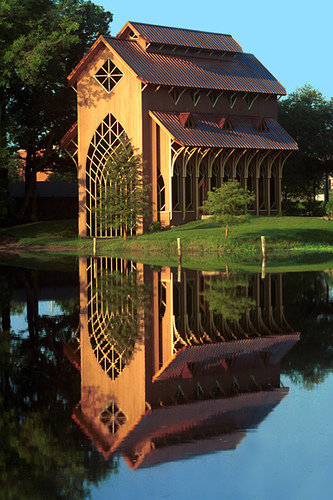
- The pavilion on Lake Alice.

General information
- Location: 982 Museum Road PO Box 112548 Gainesville, FL 32611-2548
- Completed: 2000
- Owner: University of Florida

Technical details
- Floor area: 2,482 SF

Design and construction
- Architect: John Zona
- Main contractor: AD Morgan

The Baughman Center consists of two buildings located along Lake Alice on the University of Florida campus. The main building is a 1,500-square-foot (140 m^{2}) nondenominational chapel or pavilion, while the other one is an 1,000-square-foot (93 m^{2}) administrative building. The chapel has seating for 96 people and is used for silent meditation, private contemplation, weddings, funerals and memorial services as well as a venue for small musical or performing arts events. The center, named after George F. Baughman and his wife, Hazel Baughman, the benefactors of the project and is considered an oasis of calm and beauty on the bustling campus. On April 18, 2012, the American Institute of Architects's Florida Chapter ranked the Baughman Center third on its list of Florida Architecture: 100 Years. 100 Places.

== History ==
The Baughman Center was the brainchild of George F. Baughman, a university alumnus, who was the first president of New College of Florida He was inspired by the picture of a building he found in a National Geographic magazine — perhaps the Wayfarers Chapel in Rancho Palos Verdes, California (1951) designed by Lloyd Wright (son of Frank Lloyd Wright), or possibly one of the northwest Arkansas chapels designed by E. Fay Jones (Thorncrown Chapel in Eureka Springs, 1980, or the Mildred Borum Cooper Memorial Chapel in Bella Vista, 1987). The Baughmans donated $1 million towards the project and after five years of planning, construction started. The building was completed in 2000. George Baughman died on December 24, 2004, and his memorial service was held in the center on December 30.

== Design ==
The exterior walls of the pavilion are covered in windows and made of natural Florida cypress stained to resemble the surrounding plant life. The cypress is grooved vertically to give the appearance of individual tree trunks. The sloping roof of the pavilion is composed of tongue-and-groove yellow pine and copper to mimic the look of medieval cathedrals. The front door is made of maple with inlaid Gothic patterns in cherry and an ornamental architrave of crenelated mahogany. The floor is made of three shades of travertine marble arranged in a geometric pattern based on the building's structure. The pavilion is oriented so that the dominant axis coincides with sunrise and sunset at the summer solstice, following the principle of "Orient"-ation or East-facing that is common in major religious buildings throughout the Western world.

== Gallery ==
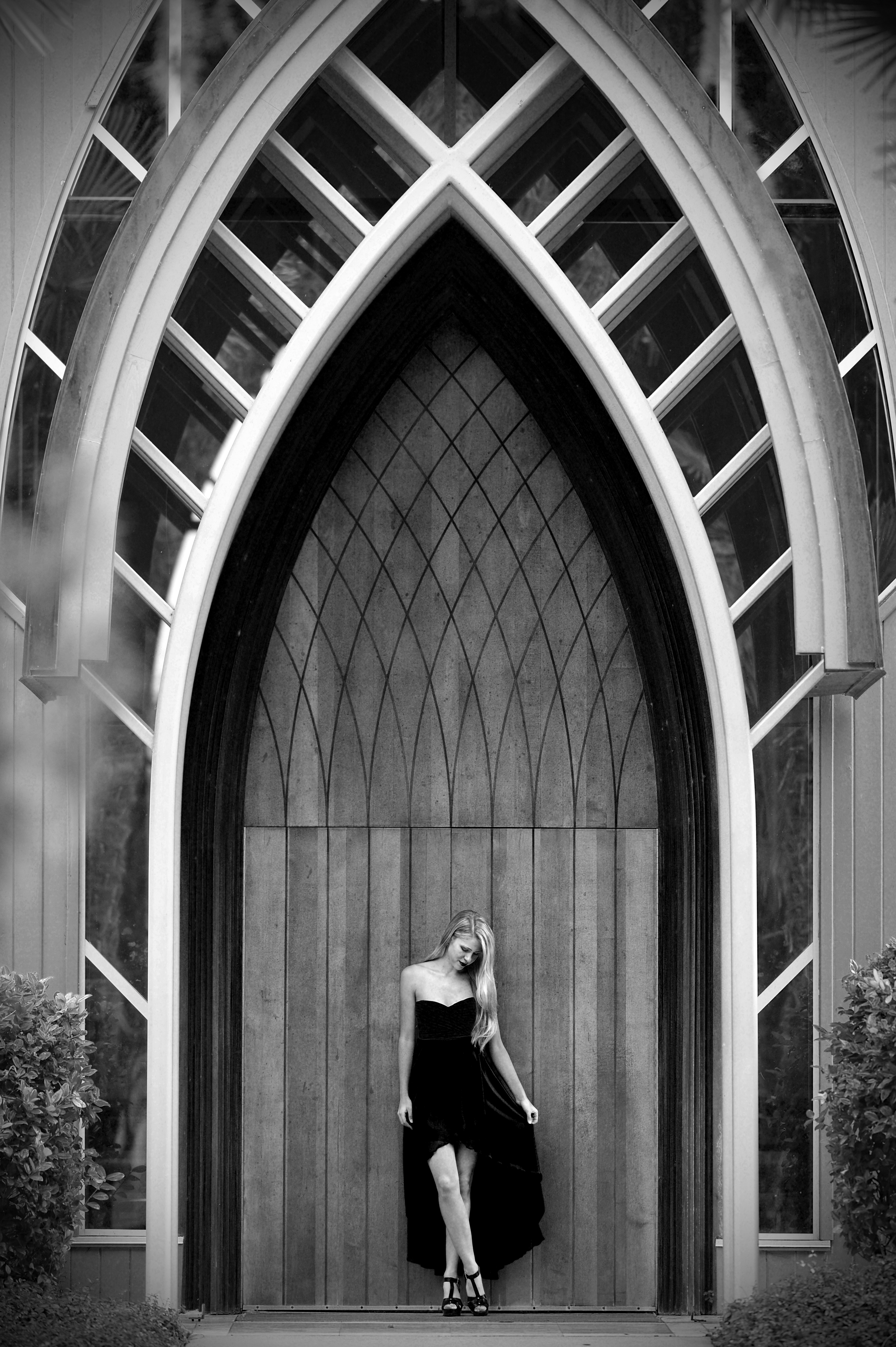
Miss UF candidate posing at the Baughman Center in 2016

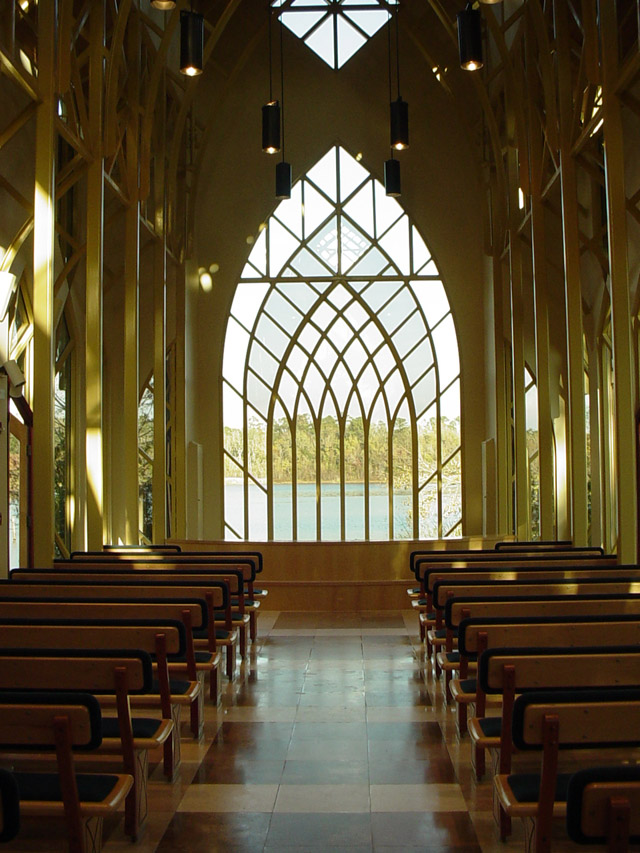
Inside view

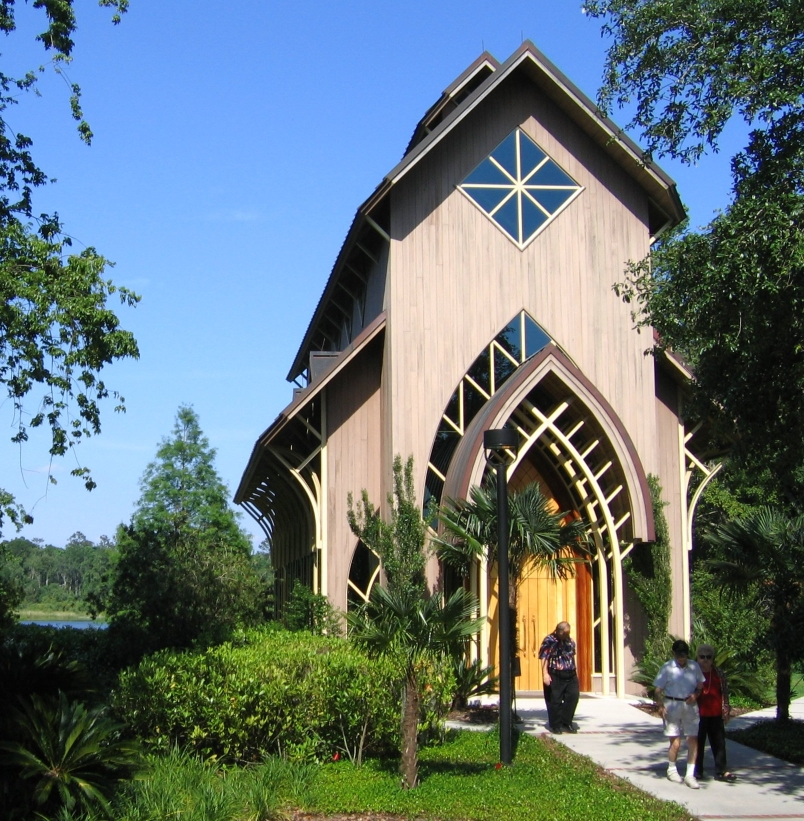
Outside the center

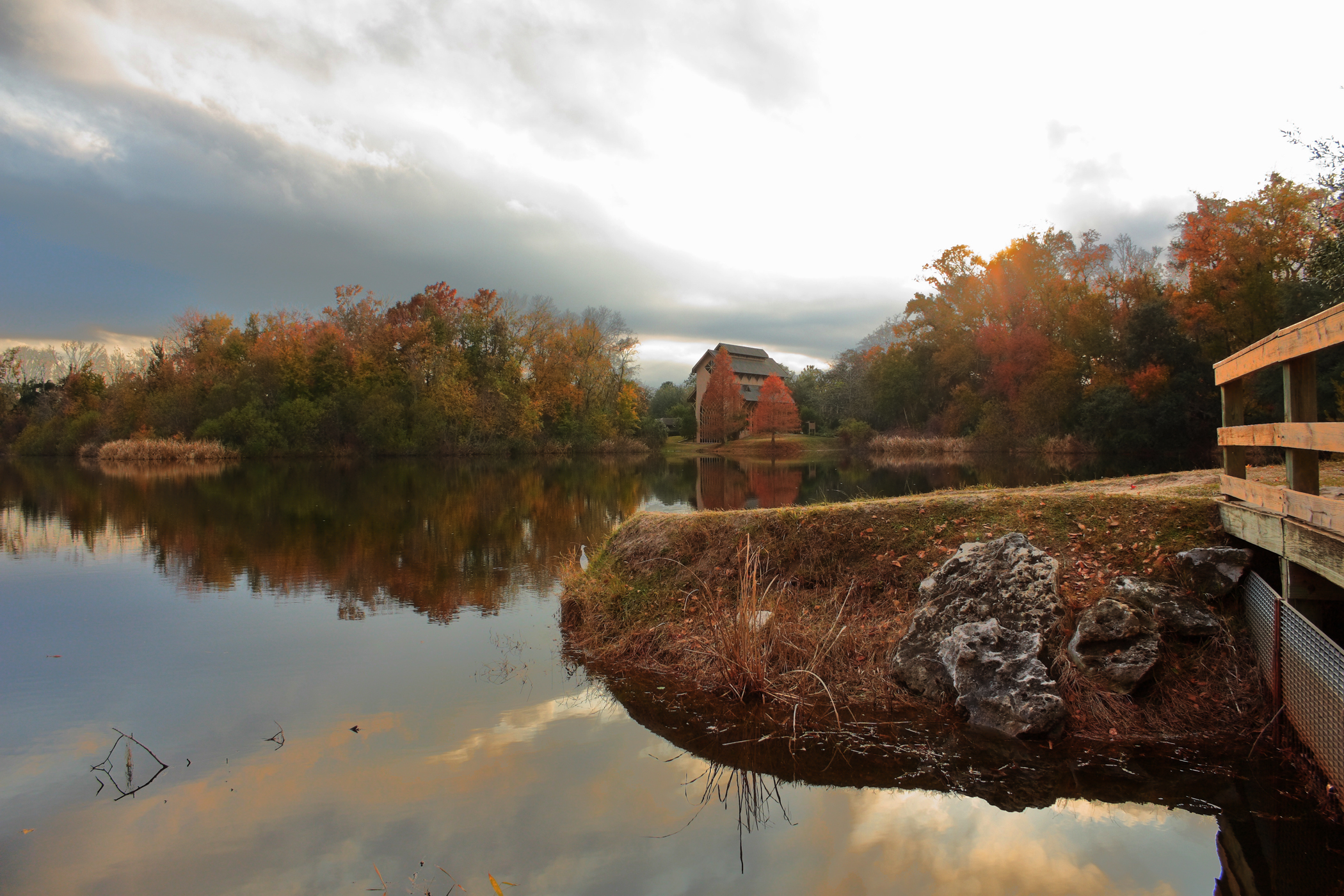
Lake Alice

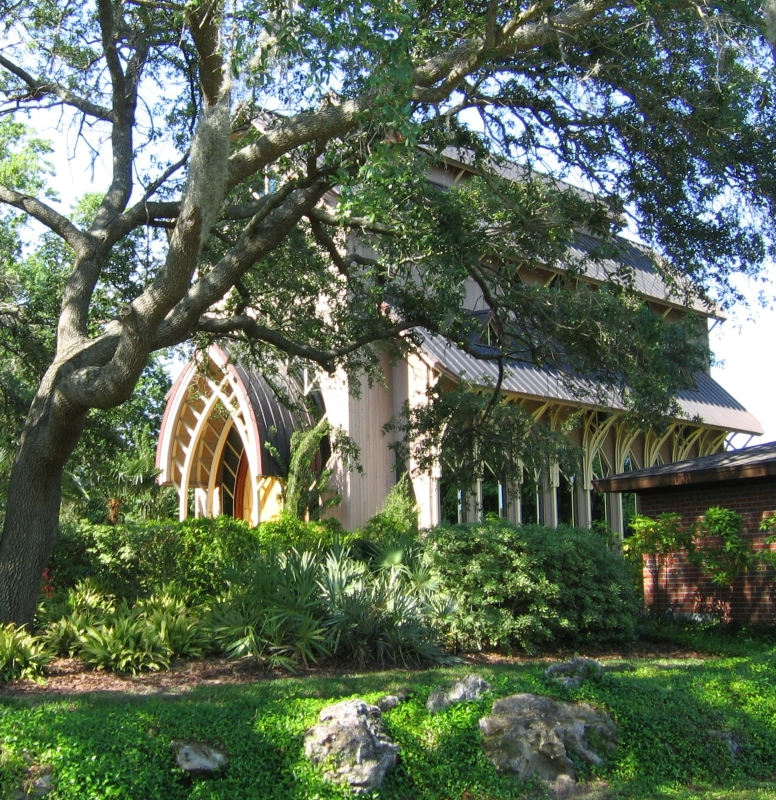
Another view
