= Bačman =

Bačman or Baçman (fl. 1229–36) was a Kipchak leader in the Lower Volga. He belonged to the Olberlik clan. In 1229 he fought the invading Mongols. The Kipchaks revolted against Mongol rule. Möngke Khan captured Kipchak leaders Bačman and Qačir-üküle. He is mentioned in several Tatar and Nogay legends, some nomad clans claiming ancestry from him.

== Sources ==
- Vásáry, István (24 March 2005). Cumans and Tatars: Oriental Military in the Pre-Ottoman Balkans, 1185–1365. Cambridge University Press. pp. 10–. ISBN 978-1-139-44408-8.
- Archivum Eurasiae Medii Aevi. Otto Harrassowitz. 1988.
- "Baçman xan". Tatar Encyclopaedia (in Tatar). Kazan: The Republic of Tatarstan Academy of Sciences. Institution of the Tatar Encyclopaedia. 2002.
