= Mary Baughman =

American physician (1874–1956)

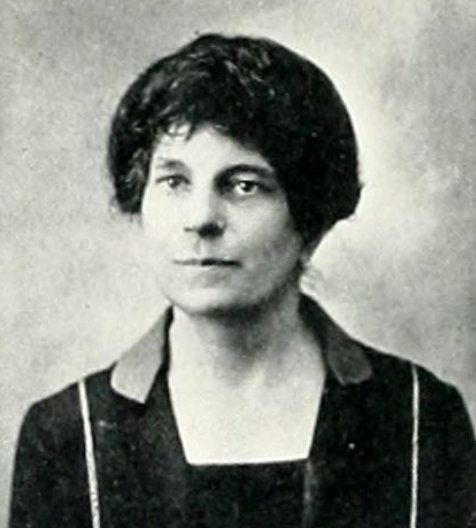
- Mary Baughman, from a 1924 yearbook
- Born: Mary Barney Baughman; September 4, 1874; Richmond, Virginia, U.S.
- Died: March 30, 1956 (aged 81); Richmond, Virginia, U.S.
- Resting place: Hollywood Cemetery
- Occupations: Physician, medical college professor, clubwoman

Mary Barney Baughman (September 4, 1874 – March 30, 1956) was an American physician, medical school professor, and clubwoman based in Richmond, Virginia.

== Early life and education ==
Baughman was born in Richmond, one of the eight children of Emilius Allen Baughman and Mary Nelson Barney Baughman. Her father ran a publishing company and stationery business, Baughman Bros., and was a Confederate States Army veteran of the American Civil War.

Baughman studied art in Paris as a young woman, then biology and gymnastics in Boston, and she worked with Charles Davenport at Cold Springs Harbor Laboratory. In 1918, at age 44, she enrolled in the Medical College of Virginia, in the first group of women students admitted for medical training. She was a founding member and president of the college's chapter of Alpha Epsilon Iota.

== Career ==
Before medical school, Baughman taught art and gymnastics in Richmond schools. In 1923 Baughman joined the Medical College of Virginia faculty, the school's first female instructor. She also had a private general practice in Richmond from 1922 to 1952, and was considered the first doctor in town to provide birth control counseling. She opposed abortion, "not concerned so much with the moral aspect of the practice as with its injury to women". She spoke in support of eugenic approaches to crime prevention at a 1936 conference in Washington, D.C. She spoke to school and community groups about public health topics including birth control, "race betterment", and the early diagnosis of tuberculosis.

Baughman was an active clubwoman in Virginia, president of the Richmond chapter of the Business and Professional Women's Club. During World War II, she helped lead the Richmond Defense Service Unit's information service, organized to provide reliable referrals for servicemen seeking lodgings or other assistance. She was known to drive soldiers to their hosts' homes, or host them herself, if other arrangements failed. "If a soldier has no place to go, it isn't Dr. Mary Baughman's fault", according to a 1942 newspaper report.

== Personal life ==
Baughman enjoyed driving as a pastime. In 1926, she drove alone touring the American West and Pacific Coast, logging over 10,000 miles. She died in 1956, aged 81 years, in Richmond. She was buried in Hollywood Cemetery.
