= Baughman Creek (Oregon) =

Location
- Country: United States
- State: Oregon
- County: Tillamook County

Physical characteristics
- Source: Northern Oregon Coast Range
  - location: low coastal hills east of Oceanside
  - coordinates: 45°27′41″N 123°57′22″W
- Mouth: Pacific Ocean
  - location: Oregon
  - coordinates: 45°27′25″N 123°58′07″W
  - elevation: 0 ft (0 m)

Baughman Creek is a small stream located in Tillamook County, Oregon. The stream originates from two sources east of Oceanside and exits into the Pacific Ocean at Oceanside Beach State Recreation Site.
