= George F. Baughman =

American college president (1915–2004)

- Born: July 15, 1915; Tampa, Florida, US
- Died: December 24, 2004 (aged 89); Gainesville, Florida, US
- Monuments: Baughman Center
- Known for: Founding New College of Florida
- Children: 2

George F. Baughman (1915–2004) was the first president of New College of Florida, a vice president of the University of Florida as well as of New York University and treasurer and a rear admiral in the United States Naval Reserve.

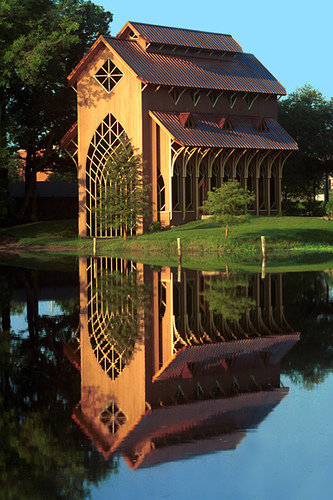
Baughman Center on Lake Alice at the University of Florida

== Early life and education ==
George Fechtig Baughman was born July 15, 1915, in Tampa, Florida at home and was educated at the University of Florida from which he received a BS in 1937 and an LLB in 1939. The LLB was replaced by a JD in the 1960s. While an undergraduate at Florida, Baughman became a member of the Beta Theta Pi fraternity. He worked at a bank in Washington, D.C. He also met his future wife, Hazel Zoerner, who also worked at a bank in Washington, DC, but returned to the University of Florida in 1941 to become associate professor of Business Law and Insurance. While in Washington, he was able to complete his MA at George Washington University.

== World War II naval service ==
During World War II, Baughman was a naval officer and served as officer-in-charge of Navy Lend Lease Supply. He remained in the naval reserve after the war and later retired as a Rear Admiral. During this time he and Hazel had two children, Sharon Ruth, born on May 27, 1944, and some three years later, Mary Gaye.

== Postwar career ==
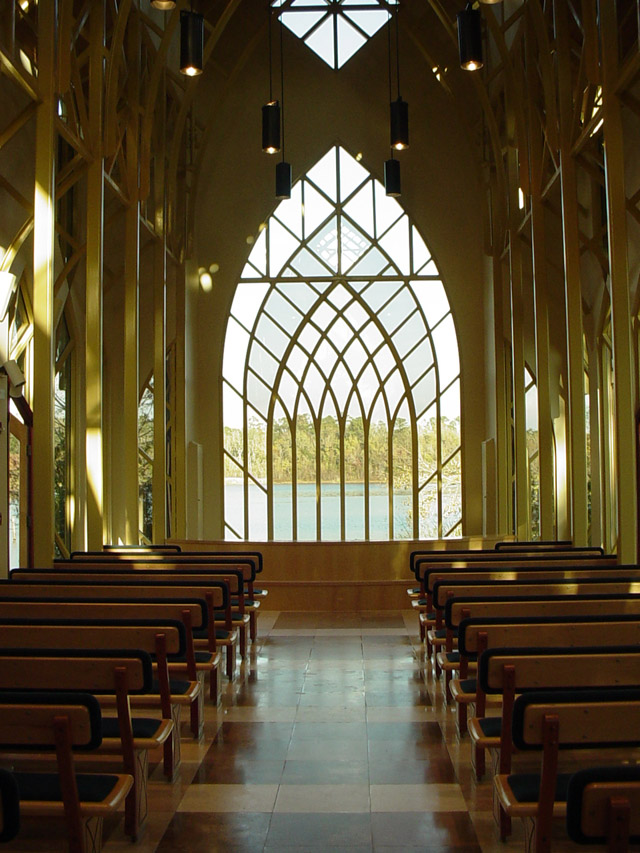
Interior of Baughman Center Pavilion

In 1946, George Baughman returned to the University of Florida where he held the position of vice president of business affairs until 1955, when he left to become business manager of New York University. He had reached the rank of vice president and treasurer of NYU when he left in 1961 to go to Sarasota to lead the Congregational Christian Church's project to create an experimental honors college of national importance.

== Presidency of New College of Florida ==
As the founding president, Baughman worked with its board of trustees to create the college from scratch by raising money to buy land and buildings, create an endowment and assemble a faculty and recruit students for its targeted 1964 opening. The Charles Ringling home and estate on Sarasota Bay was bought for the campus and I. M. Pei was hired to design the additional buildings needed. Mr. Baughman oversaw the transformation of the 115-acre estate into a campus after I.M. Pei won the architectural competition over rivals like Louis I. Kahn and Eero Saarinen Associates.

Mr. Baughman recruited much of the faculty so the first class could enter in 1964. He put into effect the original curriculum, characterized by a high degree of student responsibility for passing muster in faculty evaluations and based somewhat on the Oxford model. At the completion of the first academic year in May, 1965, George Baughman resigned as president, but stayed on as president of the New College Foundation for several years before returning to Gainesville.

== Marriage and family ==
George Baughman was married to Hazel Zoerner for 64 years and they had two daughters: Sharon Ruth and Mary Gaye. He died December 24, 2004, in Gainesville. His memorial service was held on December 30, 2004, at the Baughman Center that he and Hazel had given to the University of Florida.
