= Thundorf, Switzerland =

Thundorf
- Municipality
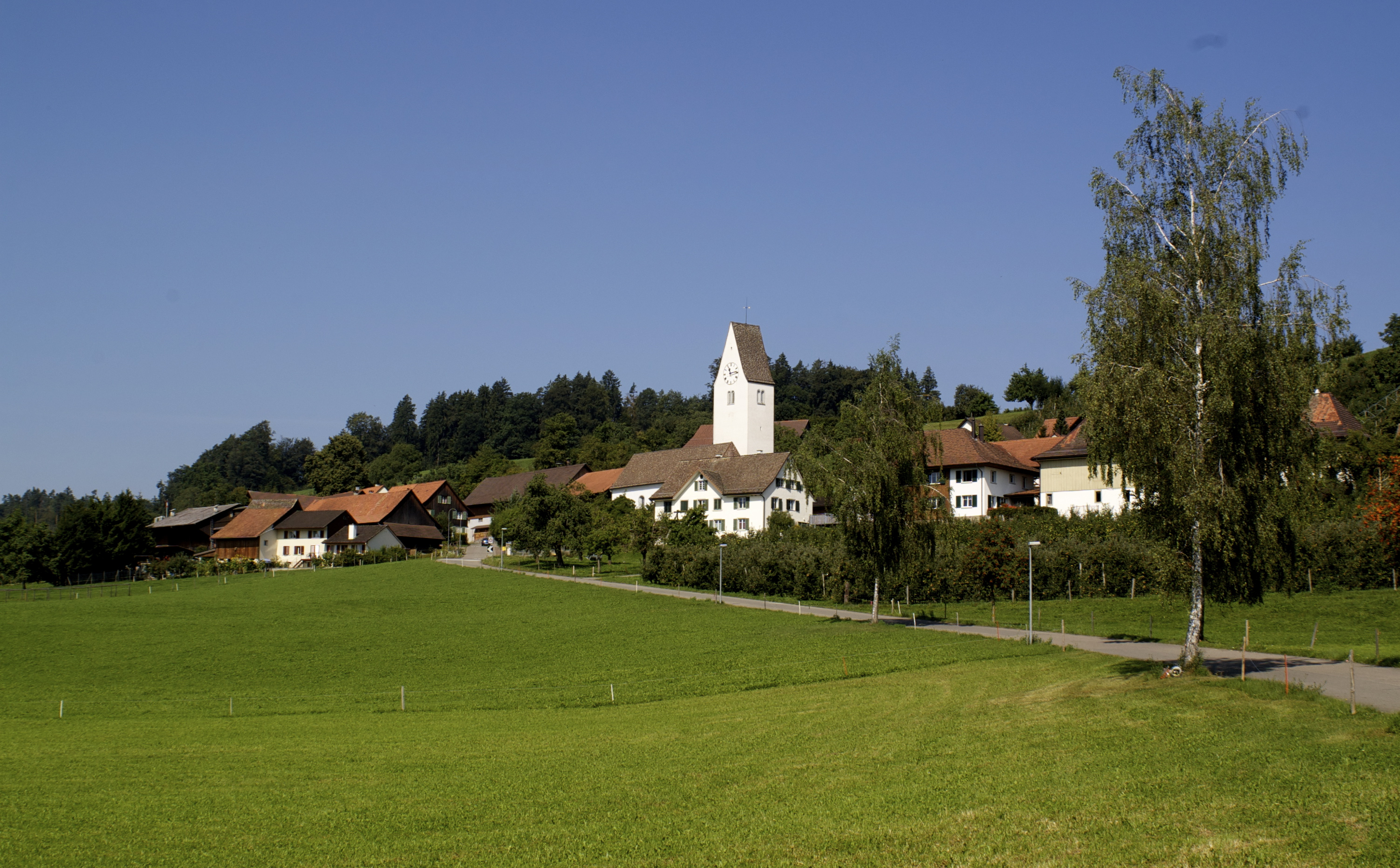

- Coat of arms
- Location of Thundorf
- Location within Switzerland Location within Canton of Thurgau
- Coordinates: 47°33′N 8°58′E
- Country: Switzerland
- Canton: Thurgau
- District: Frauenfeld

Government
  - Mayor: Stefan Blatter

Area
  - Total: 15.6 km^{2} (6.0 sq mi)
- Elevation: 546 m (1,791 ft)

Population (December 2007)
  - Total: 1,273
  - Density: 81.6/km^{2} (211/sq mi)
- Time zone: UTC+01:00 (CET)
  - Summer (DST): UTC+02:00 (CEST)
- Postal code: 8512
- SFOS number: 4611
- ISO 3166 code: CH-TG
- Localities: Thundorf, Kirchberg, Lustdorf, Wetzikon
- Surrounded by: Affeltrangen, Amlikon-Bissegg, Felben-Wellhausen, Frauenfeld, Hüttlingen, Lommis, Matzingen, Stettfurt
- Website: www.thundorf.ch

Thundorf (pronounced [ˈtuːndɔrf], in the local dialect [ˈtuəndɔrfː] or [ˈtuəndərəfː]) is a municipality in the district of Frauenfeld in the canton of Thurgau in Switzerland.

The village of Thundorf lies on a plateau above Frauenfeld. In 1995, the communal territory was enlarged to the east, when Wetzikon and Lustdorf, the latter of which until then was autonomous, were joined to it.

== Coat of arms ==
Blazon: Gules, a fess argent between three mullets of six points argent (2, 1).

== Etymology ==
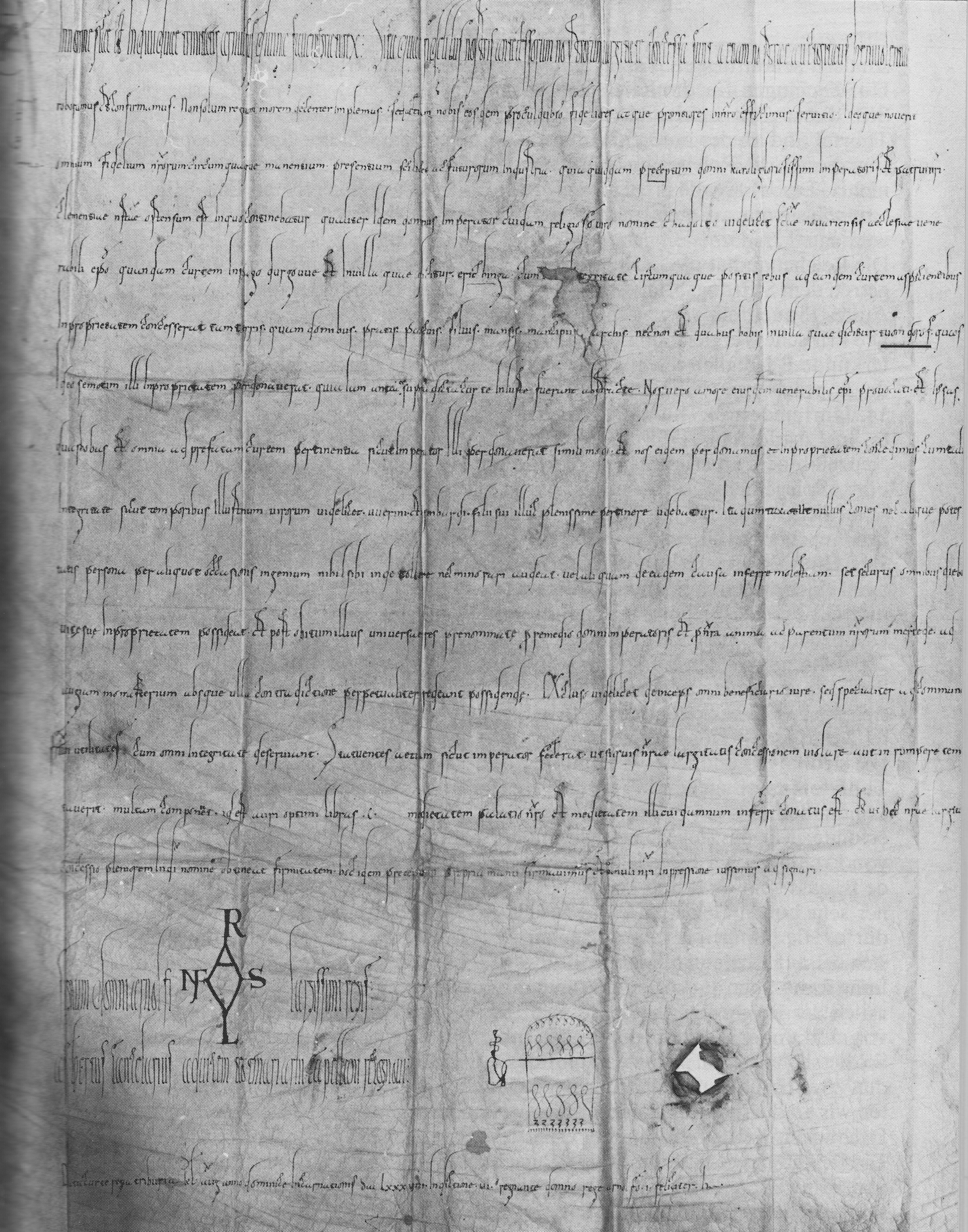
Document confirming the gift of King Arnulfs to Reichenau Abbey, the first mention of Thundorf

The earliest mention of Thundorf dates back to the year 888 (Tuomsdorof/*tuomesdorf). The name of this town is composed by the OHG anthroponym Duomo/*Tuomo and the noun substantive dorf; a hamlet, farm, village, estate, or quarter of a town‘.

== Thundorf Today ==
The village is mainly residential and has a large school with over 500 pupils. Despite having a population of over a thousand, Thundorf only has a single shop on the main street that serves the local population, selling groceries and farming supplies. Transport to the village is provided by a daily bus service that operates between Frauenfeld and Weinfeld. The town is famous locally for its annual "Banae Tanz" festival, which has been celebrated since shortly after the 1798 French Invasion and establishment of the helvetischen Republic of Loskauf and is held annually on September 9.

== Geography ==
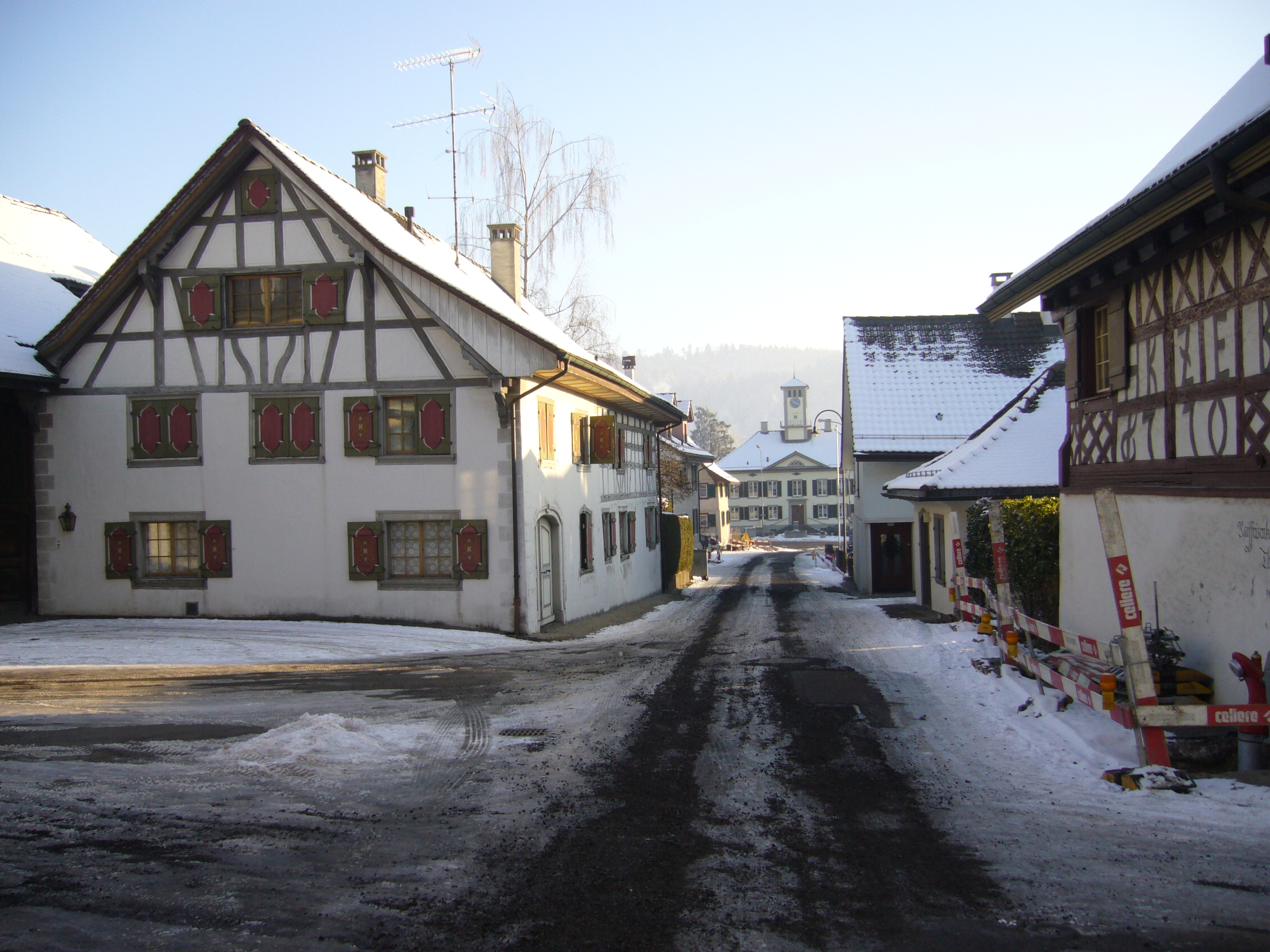
Thundorf

Thundorf has an area, as of 2009, of 15.61 square kilometers (6.03 sq mi). Of this area, 8.91 km^{2} (3.44 sq mi) or 57.1% is used for agricultural purposes, while 5.82 km^{2} (2.25 sq mi) or 37.3% is forested. Of the rest of the land, 0.88 km^{2} (0.34 sq mi) or 5.6% is settled (buildings or roads), 0.02 km^{2} (4.9 acres) or 0.1% is either rivers or lakes and 0.01 km^{2} (2.5 acres) or 0.1% is unproductive land.

Of the built up area, industrial buildings made up 2.4% of the total area while housing and buildings made up 0.1% and transportation infrastructure made up 0.2%. while parks, green belts and sports fields made up 2.8%. Out of the forested land, 35.3% of the total land area is heavily forested and 2.0% is covered with orchards or small clusters of trees. Of the agricultural land, 54.3% is used for growing crops, while 2.8% is used for orchards or vine crops. All the water in the municipality is flowing water.

In 1995 Wetzikon merged into Thundorf.

== Demographics ==
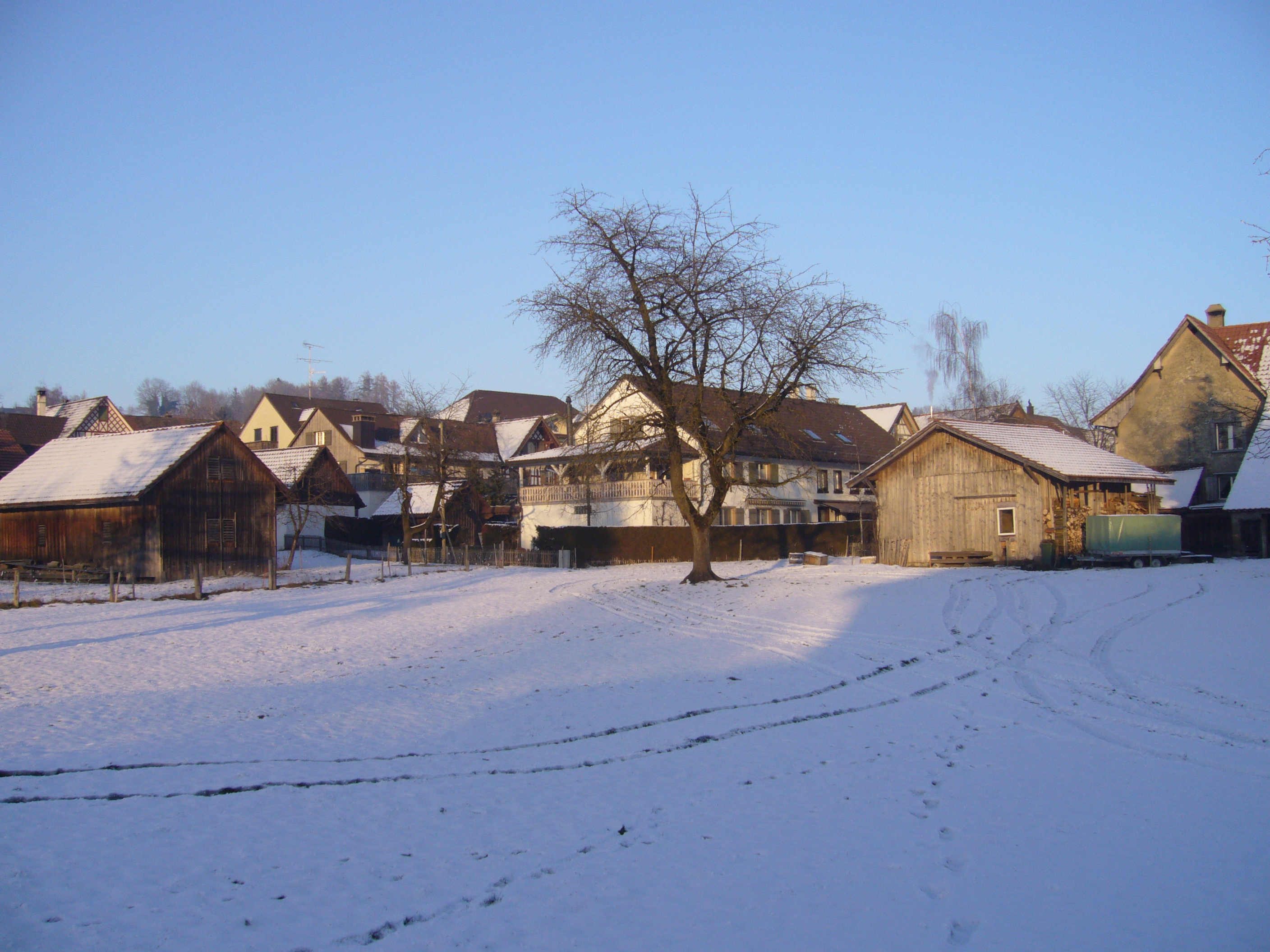
Thundorf village

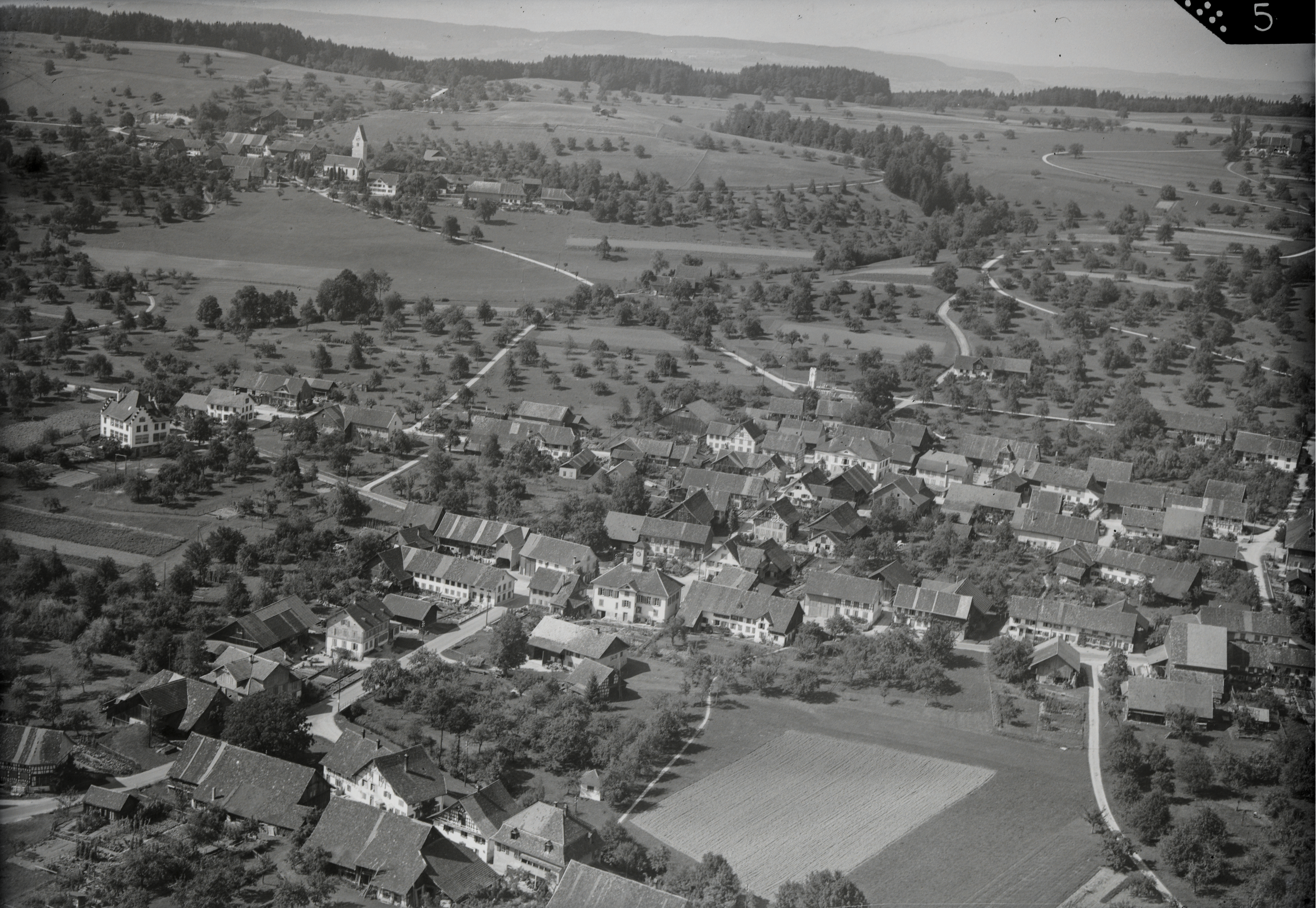
Aerial view (1947)

Thundorf has a population (as of December 2020) of 1,513. As of 2008, 7.1% of the population are foreign nationals. Over the last 10 years (1997–2007), the population has changed at a rate of 9.2%. Most of the population (as of 2000) speaks German (98.2%), with Spanish being second most common ( 0.4%) and Romansh being the third ( 0.3%).

As of 2008, the gender distribution of the population was 51.0% male and 49.0% female. The population was made up of 613 Swiss men (47.2% of the population), and 49 (3.8%) non-Swiss men. There were 593 Swiss women (45.7%), and 43 (3.3%) non-Swiss women.

In 2008, there were 12 live births to Swiss citizens with only 1 birth to non-Swiss citizens. In the same amount of time, there were 9 deaths of Swiss citizens and 1 non-Swiss citizen death. Ignoring immigration and emigration, the population of Swiss citizens increased by 3, while the foreign population remained the same. There was 1 non-Swiss man who emigrated from Switzerland to another country and 1 non-Swiss woman who immigrated from another country to Switzerland. The total Swiss population change in 2008 (from all sources) was an increase of 14, and the non-Swiss population change was an increase of 7 people. This represents a population growth rate of 1.6%.

The age distribution, as of 2009, in Thundorf is; 145 children (or 11.2% of the population) are between 0 and 9 years old, and 189 teenagers (or 14.6%) are between 10 and 19. Of the adult population, 136 people or (10.5% of the population) are between 20 and 29 years old. 154 people (or 11.9%) are between 30 and 39, 223 people (or 17.2%) are between 40 and 49, and 203 people or (15.7%) are between 50 and 59. The senior population distribution is 126 people or 9.7% of the population are between 60 and 69 years old, 69 people or 5.3% are between 70 and 79, there are 47 people or 3.6% who are between 80 and 89, and there are 4 people or 0.3% who are 90 and older.

As of 2000, there were 447 private households in the municipality, and an average of 2.6 persons per household. In 2000 there were 187 single family homes (or 84.2% of the total) out of a total of 222 inhabited buildings. There were 19 two family buildings (8.6%), 5 three family buildings (2.3%) and 11 multi-family buildings (or 5.0%). There were 248 (or 20.8%) persons who were part of a couple without children, and 744 (or 62.5%) who were part of a couple with children. There were 50 (or 4.2%) people who lived in single parent home, while there are 10 persons who were adult children living with one or both parents, 4 persons who lived in a household made up of relatives, 4 who lived in a household made up of unrelated persons, and 11 who are either institutionalized or live in another type of collective housing.

The vacancy rate for the municipality, in 2008, was 1.33%. As of 2007, the construction rate of new housing units was 4.7 new units per 1000 residents. In 2000 there were 466 apartments in the municipality. The most common apartment size was the 6 room apartment of which there were 127. There were 7 single room apartments and 127 apartments with six or more rooms. As of 2000 the average price to rent an average apartment in Thundorf was 1217.92 Swiss francs (CHF) per month (US$970, £550, €780 approx. exchange rate from 2000). The average rate for a one-room apartment was 600.00 CHF (US$480, £270, €380), a two-room apartment was about 728.75 CHF (US$580, £330, €470), a three-room apartment was about 968.48 CHF (US$770, £440, €620) and a six or more room apartment cost an average of 1661.18 CHF (US$1330, £750, €1060). The average apartment price in Thundorf was 109.1% of the national average of 1116 CHF.

In the 2007 federal election the most popular party was the SVP which received 47.08% of the vote. The next three most popular parties were the Green Party (13.55%), the CVP (12.27%) and the SP (9.49%). In the federal election, a total of 468 votes were cast, and the voter turnout was 51.1%.

The historical population is given in the following table:

year	population
1950	835
1960	797
1980	841
1990	930
2000	1,190
2024	1,737

== Sights ==
The entire village of Lustdorf is designated as part of the Inventory of Swiss Heritage Sites.

== Economy ==
As of 2007, Thundorf had an unemployment rate of 1.43%. As of 2005, there were 162 people employed in the primary economic sector and about 59 businesses involved in this sector. 172 people are employed in the secondary sector, and there are 22 businesses in this sector. However, 73 people are employed in the tertiary sector, with 27 businesses in this sector.

In 2000, 870 workers lived in the municipality. Of these, 420 or about 48.3% of the residents worked outside Thundorf while 180 people commuted into the municipality for work. There were a total of 630 jobs (of at least 6 hours per week) in the municipality. Of the working population, 7.5% used public transportation to get to work, and 49.4% used a private car.

== Religion ==
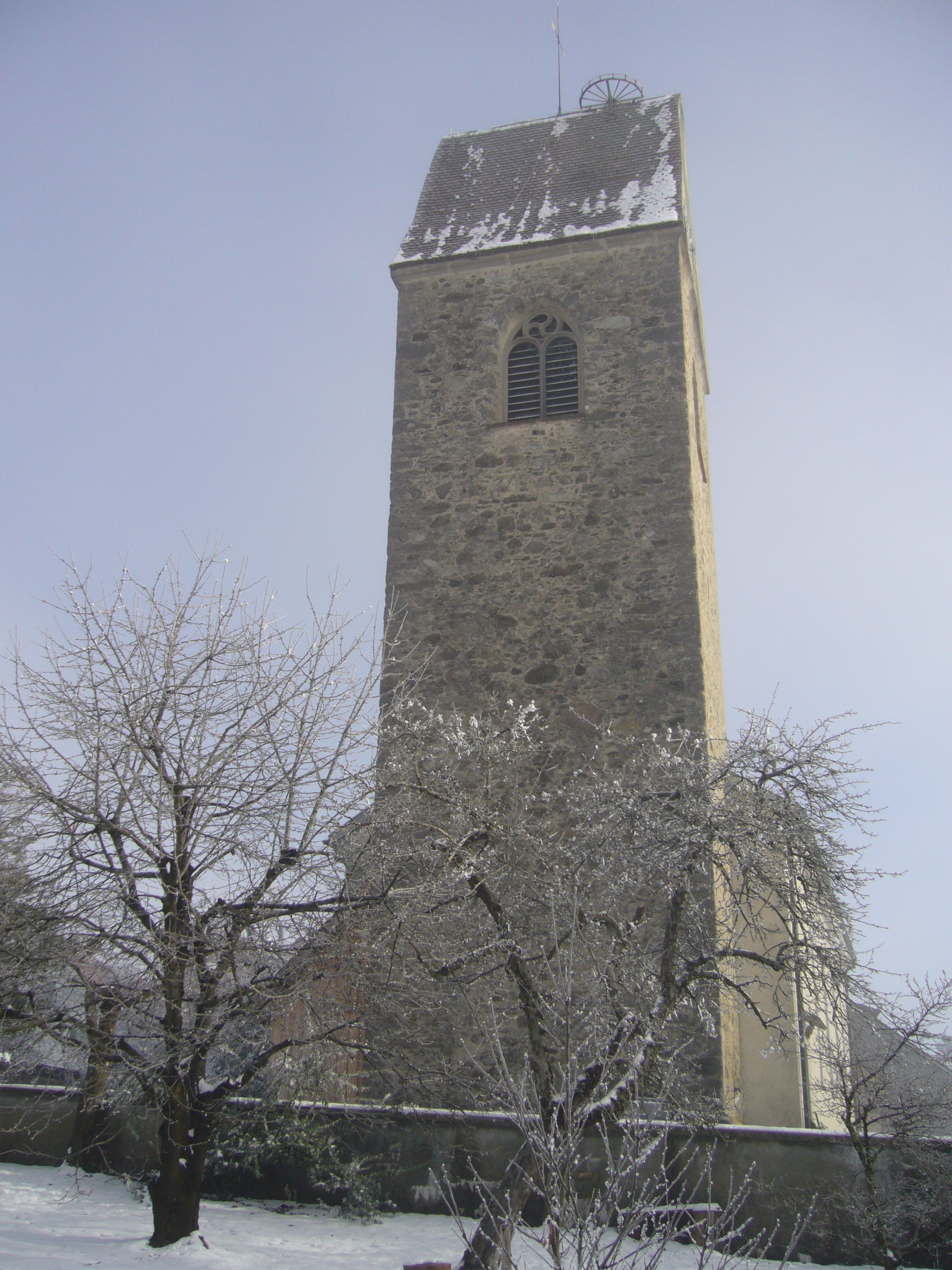
Church in Lustdorf village

From the 2000 census, 250 or 21.0% were Roman Catholic, while 775 or 65.1% belonged to the Swiss Reformed Church. Of the rest of the population, there was 1 Old Catholic who belonged to the Christian Catholic Church of Switzerland there is 1 individual who belongs to the Orthodox Church, and there are 37 individuals (or about 3.11% of the population) who belong to another Christian church. There were there is 1 individual who is Islamic. There are 2 individuals (or about 0.17% of the population) who belong to another church (not listed on the census), 100 (or about 8.40% of the population) belong to no church, are agnostic or atheist, and 23 individuals (or about 1.93% of the population) did not answer the question.

== Weather ==
Thundorf has an average of 130.8 days of rain or snow per year and on average receives 1,015 mm (40.0 in) of precipitation. The wettest month is June during which time Thundorf receives an average of 114 mm (4.5 in) of rain or snow. During this month there is precipitation for an average of 12.1 days. The month with the most days of precipitation is May, with an average of 12.9, but with only 107 mm (4.2 in) of rain or snow. The driest month of the year is March with an average of 62 mm (2.4 in) of precipitation over 12.1 days.

== Education ==
In Thundorf about 80.3% of the population (between age 25-64) have completed either non-mandatory upper secondary education or additional higher education (either university or a Fachhochschule).
