= Municipalities of the canton of Thurgau =

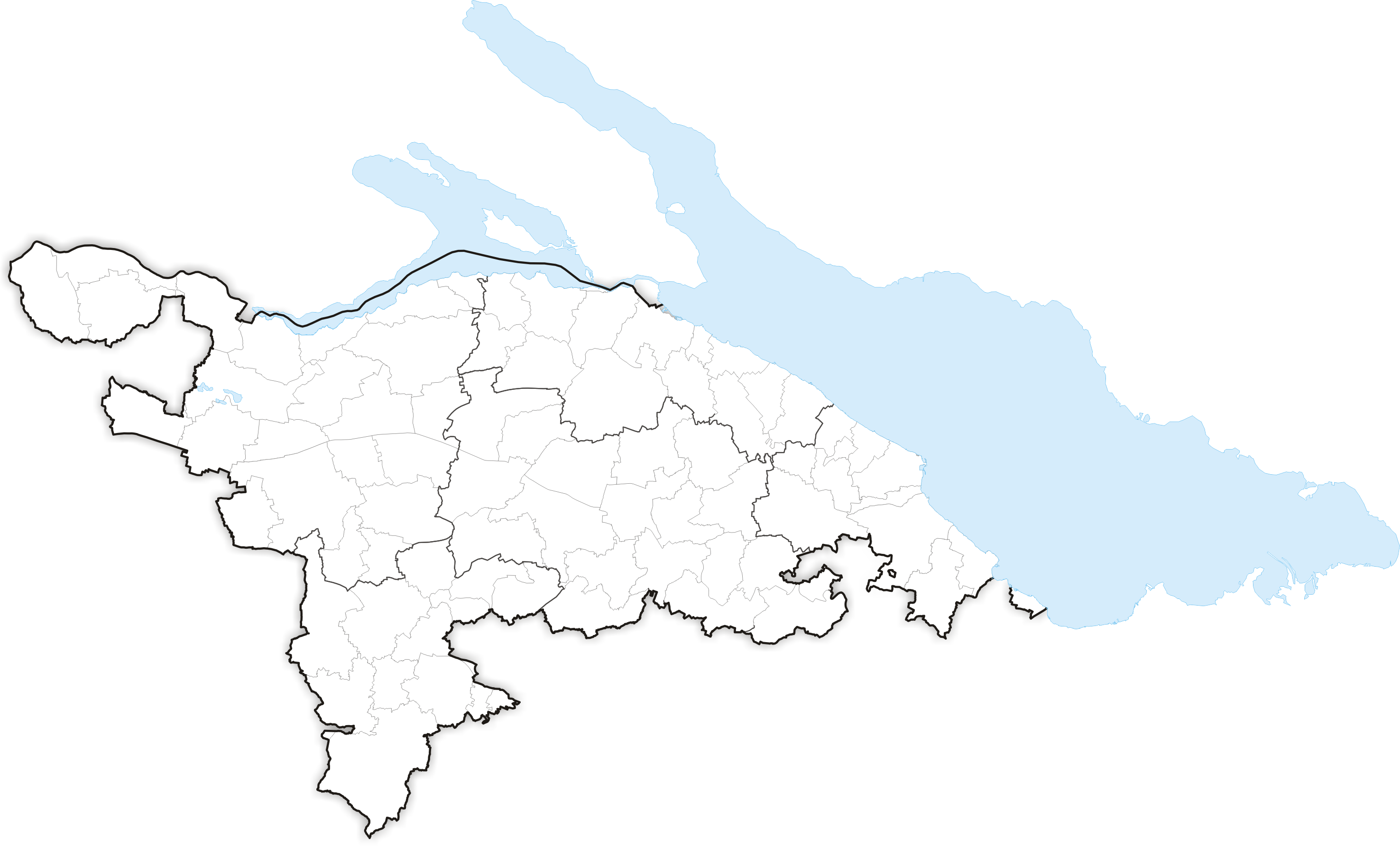
Municipalities in the canton of Thurgau

The following are the 80 municipalities of the canton of Thurgau, as of 2009.

== List ==
- Aadorf
- Affeltrangen
- Altnau
- Amlikon-Bissegg
- Amriswil
- Arbon
- Basadingen-Schlattingen
- Berg (TG)
- Berlingen
- Bettwiesen
- Bichelsee-Balterswil
- Birwinken
- Bischofszell
- Bottighofen
- Braunau
- Bürglen (TG)
- Bussnang
- Diessenhofen
- Dozwil
- Egnach
- Erlen
- Ermatingen
- Eschenz
- Eschlikon
- Felben-Wellhausen
- Fischingen
- Frauenfeld
- Gachnang
- Gottlieben
- Güttingen
- Hauptwil-Gottshaus
- Hefenhofen
- Herdern
- Hohentannen
- Homburg
- Horn
- Hüttlingen
- Hüttwilen
- Kemmental
- Kesswil
- Kradolf-Schönenberg
- Kreuzlingen
- Langrickenbach
- Lengwil
- Lommis
- Mammern
- Märstetten
- Matzingen
- Müllheim
- Münchwilen (TG)
- Münsterlingen
- Neunforn
- Pfyn
- Raperswilen
- Rickenbach (TG)
- Roggwil (TG)
- Romanshorn
- Salenstein
- Salmsach
- Schlatt (TG)
- Schönholzerswilen
- Sirnach
- Sommeri
- Steckborn
- Stettfurt
- Sulgen
- Tägerwilen
- Thundorf
- Tobel-Tägerschen
- Uesslingen-Buch
- Uttwil
- Wagenhausen
- Wäldi
- Wängi
- Warth-Weiningen
- Weinfelden
- Wigoltingen
- Wilen (TG)
- Wuppenau
- Zihlschlacht-Sitterdorf
