= Dozwil =

- Municipality
- Coat of arms
- Location of Dozwil
- Location within Switzerland Location within Canton of Thurgau
- Coordinates: 47°34′N 9°19′E
- Country: Switzerland
- Canton: Thurgau
- District: Arbon

Area
  - Total: 1.32 km^{2} (0.51 sq mi)
- Elevation: 465 m (1,526 ft)

Population (September 2007)
  - Total: 552
  - Density: 418/km^{2} (1,080/sq mi)
- Time zone: UTC+01:00 (CET)
  - Summer (DST): UTC+02:00 (CEST)
- Postal code: 8582
- SFOS number: 4406
- ISO 3166 code: CH-TG
- Surrounded by: Hefenhofen, Kesswil, Uttwil
- Website: dozwil.ch

Dozwil is a municipality in the district of Arbon in the canton of Thurgau in Switzerland.

== History ==
Aerial view (1956)

Dozwil is first mentioned in 1385 as Dotzwile.

== Geography ==
Dozwil has an area, as of 2009, of 1.32 square kilometers (0.51 sq mi). Of this area, 1.06 km^{2} (0.41 sq mi) or 80.3% is used for agricultural purposes, while 0.01 km^{2} (0.0039 sq mi) or 0.8% is forested. Of the rest of the land, 0.24 km^{2} (0.093 sq mi) or 18.2% is settled (buildings or roads).

Industrial buildings made up 14.4% of the total developed area while housing and buildings made up 1.5%, transportation infrastructure made up less than 0.1% and parks, green belts and sports fields made up 1.5%. All of the forested land area is covered with heavy forests. 59.8% of the agricultural areas are used for growing crops, while 20.5% is used for orchards or vine crops.

The municipality is located in the Arbon district, on the eastern Seerücken region. It consists of the haufendorf village (an irregular, unplanned and densely built village, built around a central square) of Dozwil.

== Demographics ==
Dozwil has a population (as of December 2020) of 683. As of 2008, 12.0% of the population are foreign nationals. Over the last 10 years (1997–2007) the population has changed at a rate of 6.5%. Most of the population (as of 2000) speaks German (95.5%), with Portuguese being second most common ( 1.0%) and Polish being third ( 1.0%).

As of 2008, the gender distribution of the population was 49.0% male and 51.0% female. The population was made up of 247 Swiss men (43.7% of the population), and 30 (5.3%) non-Swiss men. There were 250 Swiss women (44.2%), and 38 (6.7%) non-Swiss women.

In 2008 there were 8 live births to Swiss citizens and 2 births to non-Swiss citizens, and in the same time span there were 2 deaths of Swiss citizens. Ignoring immigration and emigration, the population of Swiss citizens increased by 6 while the foreign population increased by 2. In 2010, the Swiss population increased by 7 while the foreign population decreased by 7. One Swiss woman emigrated from Switzerland to another country, three non-Swiss men emigrated from Switzerland to another country and two non-Swiss women who emigrated from Switzerland to another country. The total Swiss population change in 2008 (from all sources) was an increase of 13 and the non-Swiss population change was an increase of 11 people. This represents a population growth rate of 4.4%.

The age distribution, as of 2009, in Dozwil is: 65 children or 10.7% of the population are between 0 and 9 years old and 100 teenagers or 16.4% are between 10 and 19. Of the adult population, 76 people or 12.5% of the population are between 20 and 29 years old, 61 people or 10.0% are between 30 and 39, 99 people or 16.3% are between 40 and 49, and 73 people or 12.0% are between 50 and 59. The senior population distribution is 59 people or 9.7% of the population are between 60 and 69 years old, 42 people or 6.9% are between 70 and 79, 28 people or 4.6% who are between 80 and 89, and 5 people or 0.8% who are 90 and older.

As of 2000 the average number of residents per room was 0.56 which is about equal to the cantonal average of 0.56 per room. In this case, a room is defined as space of a housing unit of at least 4 m^{2} (43 sq ft) as normal bedrooms, dining rooms, living rooms, kitchens and habitable cellars and attics. About 63.4% of the total households were owner occupied, or in other words did not pay rent (though they may have a mortgage or a rent-to-own agreement). As of 2000, there were 178 private households in the municipality, and an average of 2.7 persons per household.

In 2000 there were 89 single family homes (or 81.7% of the total) out of a total of 109 inhabited buildings. There were 12 two family buildings (11.0%), 3 three family buildings (2.8%) and 5 multi-family buildings (or 4.6%). There were 92 (or 18.7%) persons who were part of a couple without children, and 309 (or 62.8%) who were part of a couple with children. There were 19 (or 3.9%) people who lived in single parent homes, while there are 6 adult children living with one or both parents, 2 persons who lived in a household made up of relatives, 6 who lived in a household made up of unrelated persons, and 8 who are either institutionalized or live in another type of collective housing.

The vacancy rate for the municipality, in 2008, was 2.91%. As of 2007, the construction rate of new housing units was 9.2 new units per 1000 residents. In 2000 there were 195 apartments in the municipality. The most common apartment size was the 5-room apartment of which there were 52. There were 7 single room apartments and 48 apartments with six or more rooms.

In the 2007 federal election the most popular party was the SVP which received 51.85% of the vote. The next three most popular parties were the EDU Party (11.6%), the FDP (8.91%) and the CVP (7.98%). In the federal election, a total of 202 votes were cast, and the voter turnout was 55.3%.

The historical population is given in the following table:

year	population
1649	113
1850	299
1900	343
1950	344
1990	433
2000	492

== Economy ==
As of 2007, Dozwil had an unemployment rate of 2.32%. As of 2005, there were 22 people employed in the primary economic sector and about 8 businesses involved in this sector. 84 people are employed in the secondary sector and there are 5 businesses in this sector. 63 people are employed in the tertiary sector, with 13 businesses in this sector.

In 2000 there were 322 workers who lived in the municipality. Of these, 164 or about 50.9% of the residents worked outside Dozwil while 158 people commuted into the municipality for work. There were a total of 316 jobs (of at least 6 hours per week) in the municipality. Of the working population, 6.3% used public transportation to get to work, and 47.7% used a private car.

== Religion ==
According to the 2000 census, 100 or 20.3% were Roman Catholic, while 159 or 32.3% belonged to the Swiss Reformed Church. Of the rest of the population, there is 1 individual who belongs to the Orthodox Church, and there are 167 individuals (or about 33.94% of the population) who belong to another Christian church. One individual is Islamic. There are 2 individuals (or about 0.41% of the population) who belong to another church (not listed on the census), 45 (or about 9.15% of the population) belong to no church, are agnostic or atheist, and 17 individuals (or about 3.46% of the population) did not answer the question.

== Education ==
The Swiss population is generally well educated. In Dozwil, about 76.1% of the population (between age 25–64) have completed either non-mandatory upper secondary education or additional higher education (either university or a Fachhochschule).

Dozwil is home to the Dozwil primary school district. It is also home to the Dozwil-Kesswil-Uttwil secondary school district. In the 2008–2009 school year, there were 36 students in the primary school district. The lower and upper primary levels begin at about age 5-6 and lasts for 6 years. There are 12 children in who are at the lower primary level and 24 children in the upper primary level. The average class size in the primary school is 18 students. At the lower primary level, there are 7 children or 58.3% of the total population who are female, 2 or 16.7% are not Swiss citizens and 2, or 16.7%, do not speak German natively. In the upper primary level, there are 11 or 45.8% who are female, 3 or 12.5% are not Swiss citizens and 3, or 12.5%, do not speak German natively. In the secondary school district there are 111 students.

At the secondary level, students are divided according to performance. The secondary level begins at about age 12 and usually lasts 3 years. The secondary level in Dozwil consists of 111 teenagers, some of whom are in special or remedial classes, of which 51 or 45.9% are female, 11 or 9.9% are not Swiss citizens and 6 or 5.4% do not speak German natively.
