= Sommeri =

- Municipality
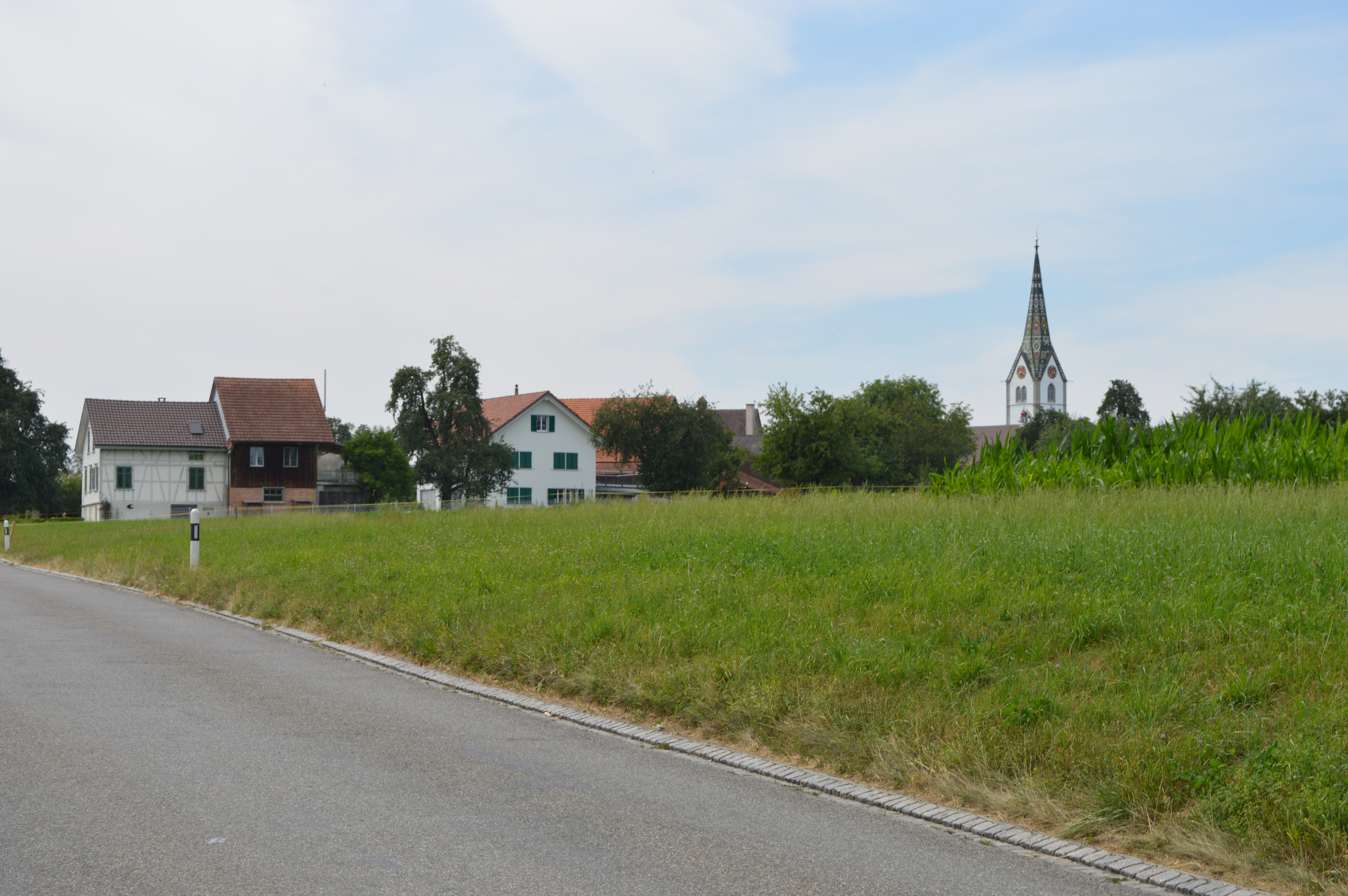

- Coat of arms
- Location of Sommeri
- Location within Switzerland Location within Canton of Thurgau
- Coordinates: 47°34′N 9°17′E
- Country: Switzerland
- Canton: Thurgau
- District: Arbon

Area
  - Total: 4.2 km^{2} (1.6 sq mi)
- Elevation: 465 m (1,526 ft)

Population (December 2007)
  - Total: 497
  - Density: 120/km^{2} (310/sq mi)
- Time zone: UTC+01:00 (CET)
  - Summer (DST): UTC+02:00 (CEST)
- Postal code: 8580
- SFOS number: 4446
- ISO 3166 code: CH-TG
- Surrounded by: Amriswil, Erlen, Güttingen, Hefenhofen, Kesswil, Langrickenbach
- Website: www.sommeri.ch

Sommeri is a municipality in the district of Arbon in the canton of Thurgau in Switzerland.

== History ==
In 1967, Sommeri was created when the municipalities of Niedersommeri and Obersommeri merged. Sommeri is first mentioned in 905 as Sumbrinaro. Between 1474 and 1798, the vogteien of Niedersommeri and Obersommeri formed a court of the Prince-Abbot of St. Gall.

In 1474 the Church of St. Mauritius was dedicated. It was renovated to its current appearance in the first half of the 15th Century. After the Protestant Reformation reached Sommeri in 1528, the church became a shared church for both faiths in 1534.

Originally the major economic activities in Sommeri were predominantly grain production and forestry. In the second half of the 19th Century fruit production, hay production, cattle and dairy farming were added. A cheese factory was opened in 1852. In the last third of the 20th Century some industrial plants moved into the villages, especially embroidery and furniture manufacturing. At the beginning of the 21st Century there were companies in the HVAC industry, precision engineering and manufacturing school furniture in Sommeri.

== Geography ==
Sommeri has an area, as of 2009, of 4.21 square kilometers (1.63 sq mi). Of this area, 2.87 km^{2} (1.11 sq mi) or 68.2% is used for agricultural purposes, while 1.01 km^{2} (0.39 sq mi) or 24.0% is forested. Of the rest of the land, 0.27 km^{2} (0.10 sq mi) or 6.4% is settled (buildings or roads).

Of the built up area, industrial buildings made up 3.6% of the total area while housing and buildings made up 0.2% and transportation infrastructure made up less than 0.1%. while parks, green belts and sports fields made up 2.4%. Out of the forested land, all of the forested land area is covered with heavy forests. Of the agricultural land, 52.3% is used for growing crops, while 15.9% is used for orchards or vine crops.

The municipality is located in the Arbon district, south of Romanshorn. It consists of the village of Sommeri and the hamlets of Buerüüti, Fälwis and Hungerbüel.

== Demographics ==
Sommeri has a population (as of December 2020) of 630. As of 2008, 9.2% of the population are foreign nationals. Over the last 10 years (1997–2007) the population has changed at a rate of 1.6%. Most of the population (as of 2000) speaks German (95.5%), with Italian being second most common ( 0.9%) and Albanian being third ( 0.8%).

As of 2008, the gender distribution of the population was 50.3% male and 49.7% female. The population was made up of 225 Swiss men (44.0% of the population), and 32 (6.3%) non-Swiss men. There were 239 Swiss women (46.8%), and 15 (2.9%) non-Swiss women.

In 2008 there were 4 live births to Swiss citizens and 1 birth to non-Swiss citizens, and in same time span there was 1 death of Swiss citizens and 1 non-Swiss citizen death. Ignoring immigration and emigration, the population of Swiss citizens increased by 3 while the foreign population remained the same. There was 1 Swiss man, 5 non-Swiss men who emigrated from Switzerland to another country and 3 non-Swiss women who emigrated from Switzerland to another country. The total Swiss population change in 2008 (from all sources) was an increase of 5 and the non-Swiss population change was an increase of 9 people. This represents a population growth rate of 2.8%.

The age distribution, as of 2009, in Sommeri is; 54 children or 10.4% of the population are between 0 and 9 years old and 65 teenagers or 12.5% are between 10 and 19. Of the adult population, 73 people or 14.1% of the population are between 20 and 29 years old. 51 people or 9.8% are between 30 and 39, 80 people or 15.4% are between 40 and 49, and 89 people or 17.2% are between 50 and 59. The senior population distribution is 39 people or 7.5% of the population are between 60 and 69 years old, 43 people or 8.3% are between 70 and 79, there are 22 people or 4.2% who are between 80 and 89, and there are 2 people or 0.4% who are 90 and older.

As of 2000, there were 181 private households in the municipality, and an average of 2.6 persons per household. In 2000 there were 72 single family homes (or 83.7% of the total) out of a total of 86 inhabited buildings. There were 9 two family buildings (10.5%), 3 three family buildings (3.5%) and 2 multi-family buildings (or 2.3%). There were 83 (or 15.6%) persons who were part of a couple without children, and 308 (or 58.0%) who were part of a couple with children. There were 16 (or 3.0%) people who lived in single parent home, while there are 8 persons who were adult children living with one or both parents, 6 persons who lived in a household made up of relatives, 8 who lived in a household made up of unrelated persons, and 53 who are either institutionalized or live in another type of collective housing.

The vacancy rate for the municipality, in 2008, was 1.89%. As of 2007, the construction rate of new housing units was 8 new units per 1000 residents. In 2000 there were 194 apartments in the municipality. The most common apartment size was the 6 room apartment of which there were 57. There were - single room apartments and 57 apartments with six or more rooms.

In the 2007 federal election the most popular party was the SVP which received 48.12% of the vote. The next three most popular parties were the Green Party (21.28%), the CVP (13.59%) and the SP (4.96%). In the federal election, a total of 203 votes were cast, and the voter turnout was 54.7%.

The historical population is given in the following table:

| year | population |
|---|---|
| 1831 | 455 |
| 1850 | 429 |
| 1900 | 418 |
| 1960 | 588 |
| 1990 | 502 |
| 2000 | 495 |

== Sights ==
The entire village of Sommeri is designated as part of the Inventory of Swiss Heritage Sites.

== Economy ==
As of 2007, Sommeri had an unemployment rate of 0.94%. As of 2005, there were 52 people employed in the primary economic sector and about 23 businesses involved in this sector. 73 people are employed in the secondary sector and there are 9 businesses in this sector. 190 people are employed in the tertiary sector, with 16 businesses in this sector.

In 2000 there were 402 workers who lived in the municipality. Of these, 160 or about 39.8% of the residents worked outside Sommeri while 211 people commuted into the municipality for work. There were a total of 453 jobs (of at least 6 hours per week) in the municipality. Of the working population, 3.6% used public transportation to get to work, and 39.4% used a private car.

== Religion ==
From the 2000 census, 282 or 53.1% were Roman Catholic, while 168 or 31.6% belonged to the Swiss Reformed Church. Of the rest of the population, there is 1 individual who belongs to the Orthodox Church, and there are 19 individuals (or about 3.58% of the population) who belong to another Christian church. There were 14 (or about 2.64% of the population) who are Islamic. There are 5 individuals (or about 0.94% of the population) who belong to another church (not listed on the census), 30 (or about 5.65% of the population) belong to no church, are agnostic or atheist, and 12 individuals (or about 2.26% of the population) did not answer the question.

== Education ==
In Sommeri about 68.3% of the population (between age 25–64) have completed either non-mandatory upper secondary education or additional higher education (either university or a Fachhochschule).
