= Hohgrat =

Mountain in Switzerland

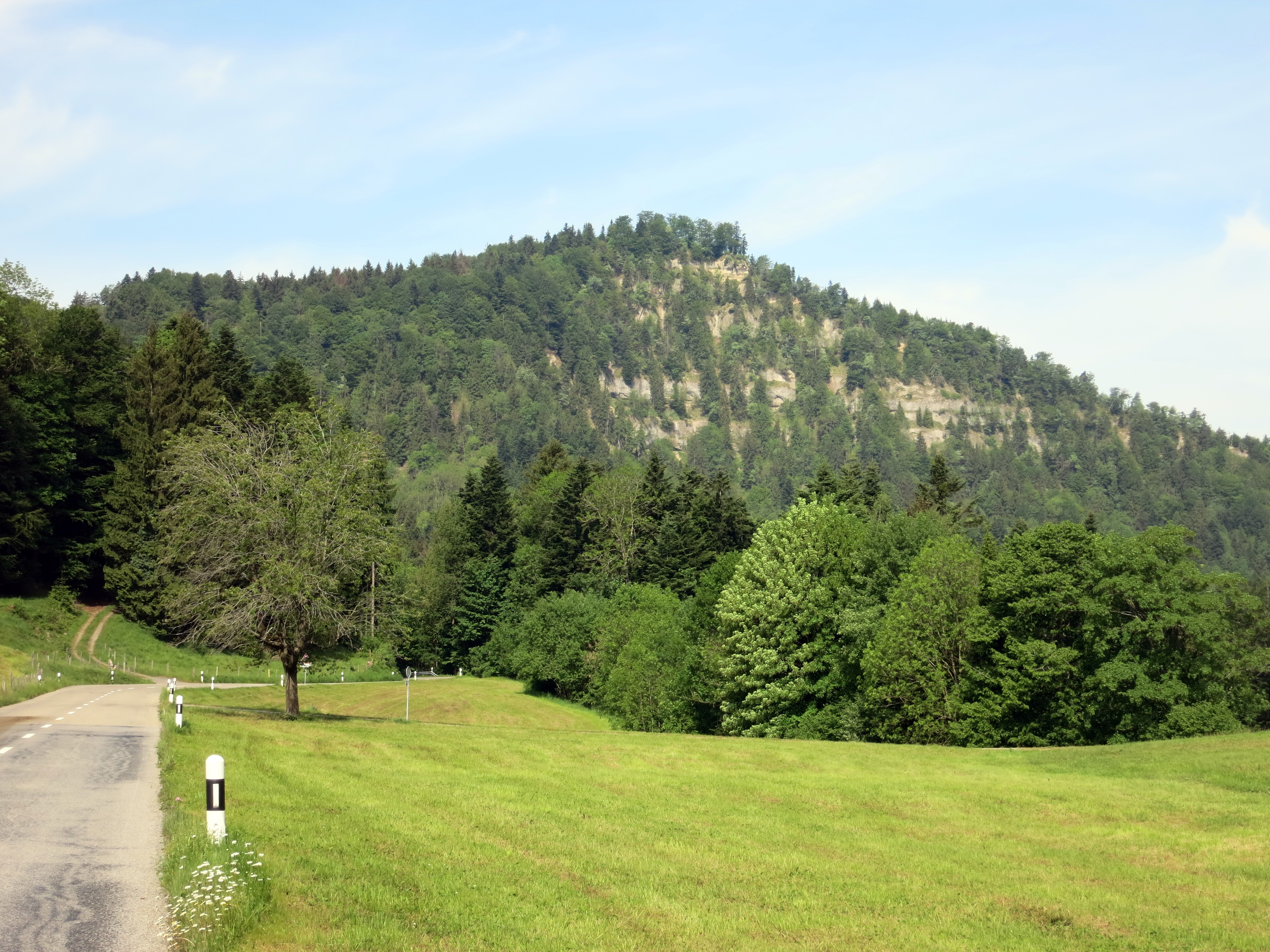

Highest point
- Elevation: 996 m (3,268 ft)
- Prominence: 106 m (348 ft)
- Parent peak: Hörnli
- Listing: Canton high point
- Coordinates: 47°23′07.5″N 08°57′58″E

Geography
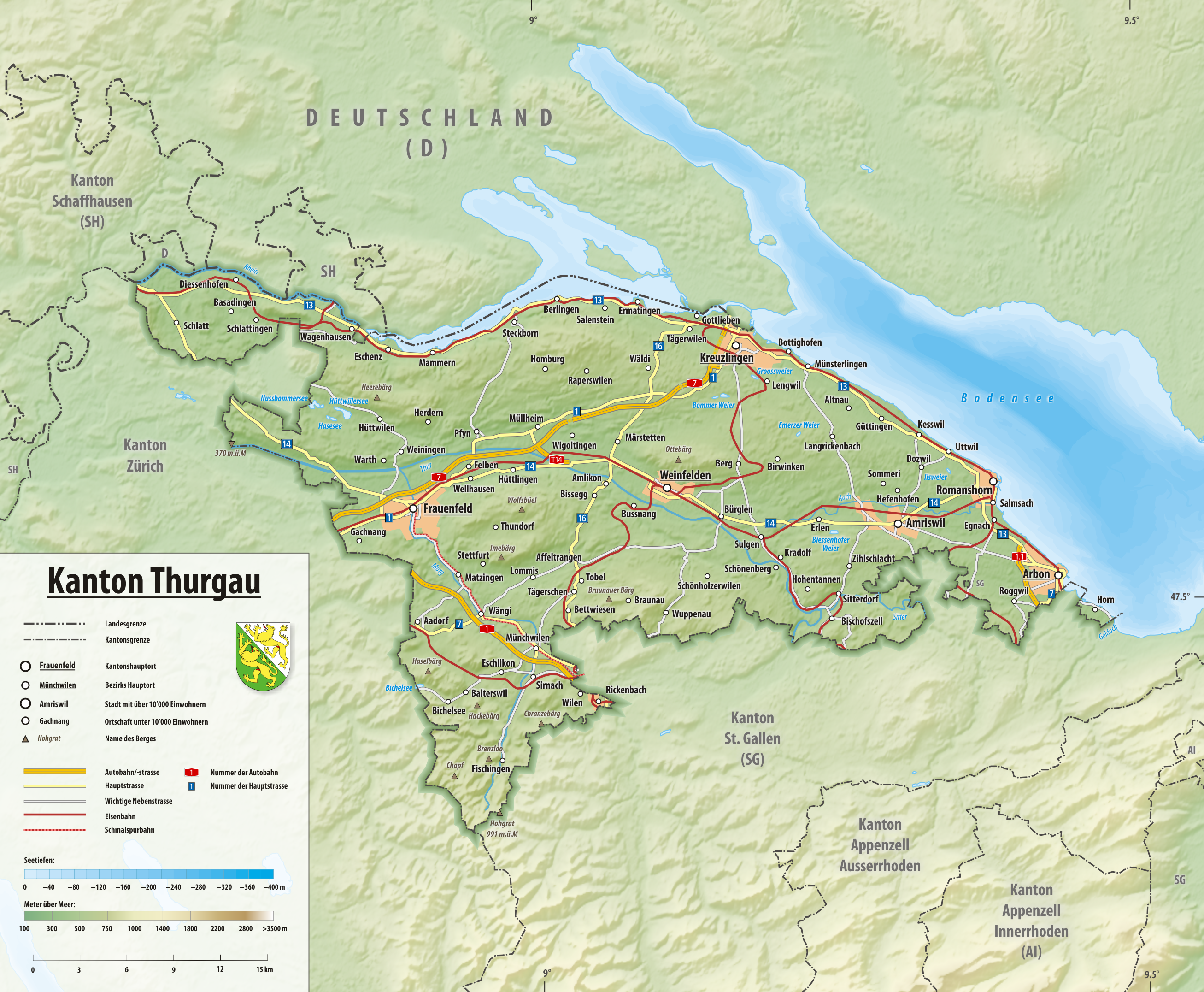
- Location within Switzerland Location within Canton of St. Gallen Location within Canton of Thurgau
- Location: Thurgau/St. Gallen
- Country: Switzerland
- Parent range: Appenzell Alps

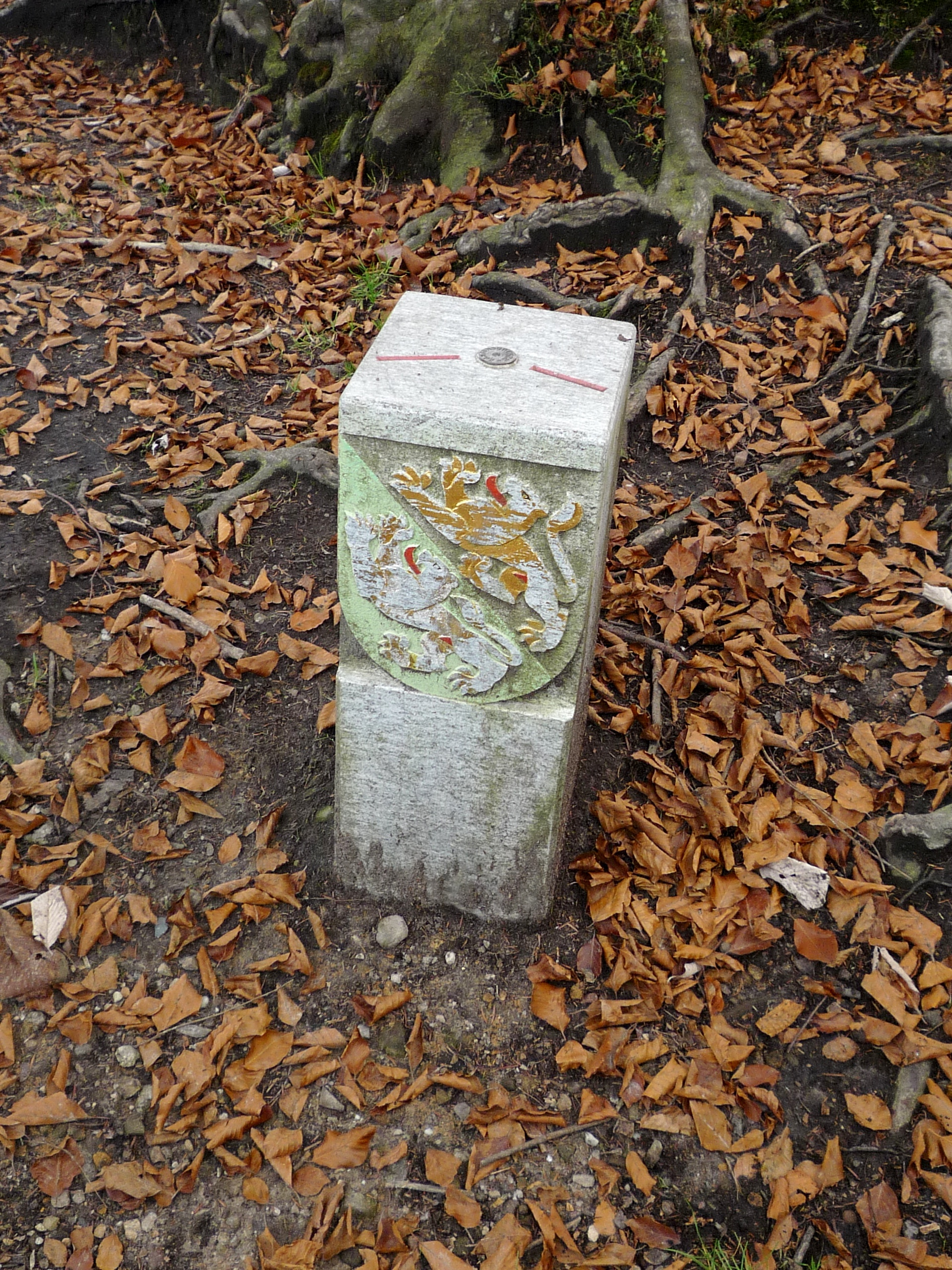
On the summit

The Hohgrat, also known as Grat, is a mountain located on the border between the Swiss cantons of Thurgau (municipality of Fischingen) and St. Gallen (municipality of Mosnang, Toggenburg). Reaching a height of 996 metres (3,268 ft) above sea level, it is the highest point of the canton of Thurgau.

The mountain is densely forested, except the eastern (St. Gallen) side, which includes some limestone cliffs.

== See also ==
- List of mountains of the canton of St. Gallen
