= Kesswil =

- Municipality
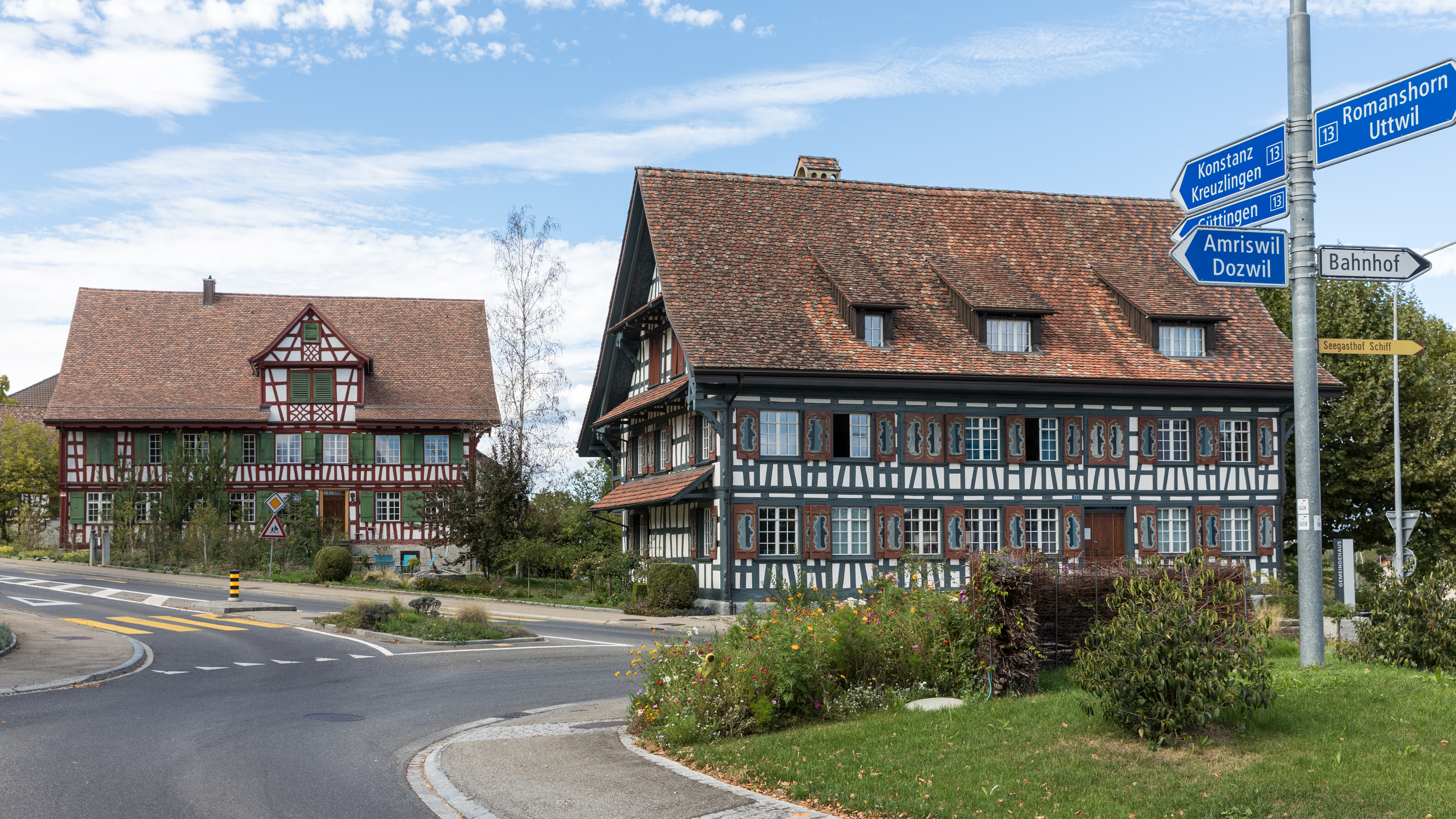

- Coat of arms
- Location of Kesswil
- Location within Switzerland Location within Canton of Thurgau
- Coordinates: 47°35′N 9°19′E
- Country: Switzerland
- Canton: Thurgau
- District: Arbon

Area
  - Total: 4.47 km^{2} (1.73 sq mi)
- Elevation: 412 m (1,352 ft)

Population (December 2007)
  - Total: 951
  - Density: 213/km^{2} (551/sq mi)
- Time zone: UTC+01:00 (CET)
  - Summer (DST): UTC+02:00 (CEST)
- Postal code: 8593
- SFOS number: 4426
- ISO 3166 code: CH-TG
- Surrounded by: Dozwil, Güttingen, Hagnau am Bodensee (DE-BY), Hefenhofen, Immenstaad am Bodensee (DE-BY), Sommeri, Uttwil
- Website: www.kesswil.ch

Kesswil is a municipality in the district of Arbon in the canton of Thurgau in Switzerland.

The village was the birthplace of the influential psychiatrist Carl Jung, who was born on July 26, 1875.

== History ==
Kesswil is first mentioned in 817 as Chezzinwillare. In the 9th century, the Abbey of St. Gall owned land in Kesswil. In the 13th century, Münsterlingen Abbey acquired rights over the town. From the Late Middle Ages until 1798, Kesswil was under the courts of the Abbot of St. Gall.

In 1429 the monastery of Münsterlingen allowed the construction of a chapel. In 1529 the parish (which included Dozwil, and after 1588 also included Uttwil) converted to the Protestant Reformation.

Aerial view (1957)

In the 19th century, most of the local economy was based mostly around agriculture, viticulture and fisheries, though some weaving, trade and small businesses were also located in the village. With the transition to cattle and dairy farming, the number of fruit-growing orchards increased. The Seetalbahn opened in 1870, but brought the village little industry or trade. By 1900, there were some small embroidery businesses in the village. K. premises. At the beginning of the 21st century, the walnut factory Matzingen AG (prior to 2003, the building was the Pressta AG Tubes Factory) employed 85 employees in 2005. Many of the other local jobs were in farming (fruit, berries) and a nursery (Roth Pflanzen AG).

== Geography ==
Kesswil has an area, as of 2009, of 4.47 square kilometers (1.73 sq mi). Of this area, 2.49 km^{2} (0.96 sq mi) or 55.7% is used for agricultural purposes, while 1.32 km^{2} (0.51 sq mi) or 29.5% is forested. Of the rest of the land, 0.61 km^{2} (0.24 sq mi) or 13.6% is settled (buildings or roads).

Of the built up area, industrial buildings made up 7.4% of the total area while housing and buildings made up 0.2% and transportation infrastructure made up 0.2%. While parks, green belts and sports fields made up 5.4%. Out of the forested land, 28.0% of the total land area is heavily forested and 1.6% is covered with orchards or small clusters of trees. Of the agricultural land, 33.3% is used for growing crops, while 22.4% is used for orchards or vine crops.

The municipality is located in the Arbon district, between Romanshorn and Kreuzlingen on Lake Constance.

== Demographics ==
Kesswil has a population (as of December 2020) of 998 As of 2008, 16.9% of the population are foreign nationals. Over the last 10 years (1997–2007) the population has changed at a rate of 10.9%. Most of the population (as of 2000) speaks German (93.5%), with Italian being second most common (1.9%) and Portuguese being third (1.4%).

As of 2008, the gender distribution of the population was 49.8% male and 50.2% female. The population was made up of 409 Swiss men (41.6% of the population), and 81 (8.2%) non-Swiss men. There were 408 Swiss women (41.5%), and 85 (8.6%) non-Swiss women.

In 2008 there were 5 live births to Swiss citizens and 3 births to non-Swiss citizens, and in same time span there were 4 deaths of Swiss citizens and 1 non-Swiss citizen death. Ignoring immigration and emigration, the population of Swiss citizens increased by 1 while the foreign population increased by 2. There were 2 Swiss men who emigrated from Switzerland to another country, 1 Swiss woman who emigrated from Switzerland to another country, 12 non-Swiss men who emigrated from Switzerland to another country and 5 non-Swiss women who emigrated from Switzerland to another country. The total Swiss population change in 2008 (from all sources) was an increase of 15 and the non-Swiss population change was an increase of 12 people. This represents a population growth rate of 2.8%. a The age distribution, as of 2009, in Kesswil is; 113 children or 11.5% of the population are between 0 and 9 years old and 104 teenagers or 10.6% are between 10 and 19. Of the adult population, 115 people or 11.7% of the population are between 20 and 29 years old. 105 people or 10.7% are between 30 and 39, 161 people or 16.4% are between 40 and 49, and 141 people or 14.4% are between 50 and 59. The senior population distribution is 116 people or 11.8% of the population are between 60 and 69 years old, 86 people or 8.8% are between 70 and 79, there are 35 people or 3.6% who are between 80 and 89, and there are 5 people or 0.5% who are 90 and older.

As of 2000, there were 345 private households in the municipality, and an average of 2.4 persons per household. In 2000 there were 179 single family homes (or 80.6% of the total) out of a total of 222 inhabited buildings. There were 20 two family buildings (9.0%), 9 three family buildings (4.1%) and 14 multi-family buildings (or 6.3%). There were 241 (or 28.4%) persons who were part of a couple without children, and 460 (or 54.1%) who were part of a couple with children. There were 25 (or 2.9%) people who lived in single parent home, while there are 2 persons who were adult children living with one or both parents, 2 persons who lived in a household made up of relatives, 7 who lived in a household made up of unrelated persons, and 7 who are either institutionalized or live in another type of collective housing.

The vacancy rate for the municipality, in 2008, was 1.33%. As of 2007, the construction rate of new housing units was 4.2 new units per 1000 residents. In 2000 there were 413 apartments in the municipality. The most common apartment size was the 4 room apartment of which there were 103. There were 23 single room apartments and 96 apartments with six or more rooms. As of 2000 the average price to rent an average apartment in Kesswil was 1095.48 Swiss francs (CHF) per month (US$880, £490, €700 approx. exchange rate from 2000). The average rate for a one-room apartment was 481.67 CHF (US$390, £220, €310), a two-room apartment was about 514.17 CHF (US$410, £230, €330), a three-room apartment was about 906.19 CHF (US$720, £410, €580) and a six or more room apartment cost an average of 2185.00 CHF (US$1750, £980, €1400). The average apartment price in Kesswil was 98.2% of the national average of 1116 CHF.

In the 2007 federal election the most popular party was the SVP which received 40.13% of the vote. The next three most popular parties were the FDP (14.7%), the CVP (13.62%) and the Green Party (12.74%). In the federal election, a total of 405 votes were cast, and the voter turnout was 63.5%.

The historical population is given in the following table:

year	population
1649	388
1850	522
1888	572
1900	529
1950	494
1960	488
2000	850

== Sights ==
The entire village of Kesswil is designated as part of the Inventory of Swiss Heritage Sites.

== Economy ==
As of 2007, Kesswil had an unemployment rate of 1.1%. As of 2005, there were 124 people employed in the primary economic sector and about 18 businesses involved in this sector. 154 people are employed in the secondary sector and there are 12 businesses in this sector. 105 people are employed in the tertiary sector, with 25 businesses in this sector.

In 2000 there were 574 workers who lived in the municipality. Of these, 262 or about 45.6% of the residents worked outside Kesswil while 231 people commuted into the municipality for work. There were a total of 543 jobs (of at least 6 hours per week) in the municipality. Of the working population, 13% used public transportation to get to work, and 46.3% used a private car.

== Religion ==
From the 2000 census, 244 or 28.7% were Roman Catholic, while 430 or 50.6% belonged to the Swiss Reformed Church. Of the rest of the population, and there are 47 individuals (or about 5.53% of the population) who belong to another Christian church. There were 19 (or about 2.24% of the population) who are Muslim. There are 3 individuals (or about 0.35% of the population) who belong to another church (not listed on the census), 87 (or about 10.24% of the population) belong to no church, are agnostic or atheist, and 20 individuals (or about 2.35% of the population) did not answer the question.

== Transport ==
Kesswil sits on the Lake Line between Schaffhausen and Rorschach and is served by the St. Gallen S-Bahn at Kesswil railway station.

== Education ==
In Kesswil about 77.9% of the population (between age 25 and 64) have completed either non-mandatory upper secondary education or additional higher education (either university or a Fachhochschule).

Kesswil is part of the Dozwil-Kesswil-Uttwil secondary school district. It is also home to the Kesswil primary school district.

In the primary school district there are 86 students. There are 20 children in the kindergarten, and the average class size is 20 kindergartners. Of the children in kindergarten, 9 or 45.0% are female, 2 or 10.0% are not Swiss citizens. The lower and upper primary levels begin at about age 5-6 and lasts for 6 years. There are 37 children in who are at the lower primary level and 29 children in the upper primary level. The average class size in the primary school is 22 students. At the lower primary level, there are 22 children or 59.5% of the total population who are female, 3 or 8.1% are not Swiss citizens and 2 or 5.4% do not speak German natively. In the upper primary level, there are 16 or 55.2% who are female, 3 or 10.3% are not Swiss citizens and 2 or 6.9% do not speak German natively.

In the 2008/2009 school year there are 111 students in the secondary school district. At the secondary level, students are divided according to performance. The secondary level begins at about age 12 and usually lasts 3 years. Finally, there are 111 teenagers who are in special or remedial classes, of which 51 or 45.9% are female, 11 or 9.9% are not Swiss citizens and 6 or 5.4% do not speak German natively.
