= Arbon District =

Coordinates: 47°31′N 9°26′E

Arbon District Bezirk Arbon
- District
- Country: Switzerland
- Canton: Thurgau
- Capital: Arbon

Area
  - Total: 88.8 km^{2} (34.3 sq mi)

Population (2020)
  - Total: 58,414
  - Density: 658/km^{2} (1,700/sq mi)
- Time zone: UTC+1 (CET)
  - Summer (DST): UTC+2 (CEST)
- Municipalities: 12

Arbon District is one of the five districts of the canton of Thurgau in Switzerland. It has a population of 58,414 (as of 31 December 2020). Its capital is the town of Arbon.

The district contains the following municipalities:

Coat of arms	Municipality	Population (31 December 2020)	Area km^{2}
	Amriswil	14,211	19.1
	Arbon	14,950	5.9
	Dozwil	683	1.4
	Egnach	4,789	18.5
	Hefenhofen	1,277	6.1
	Horn	2,888	1.7
	Kesswil	998	4.4
	Roggwil (TG)	3,257	11.9
	Romanshorn	11,327	8.7
	Salmsach	1,481	2.6
	Sommeri	630	4.2
	Uttwil	1,923	4.3
	Total (12)	58,414	88.8
