= Hefenhofen =

- Municipality
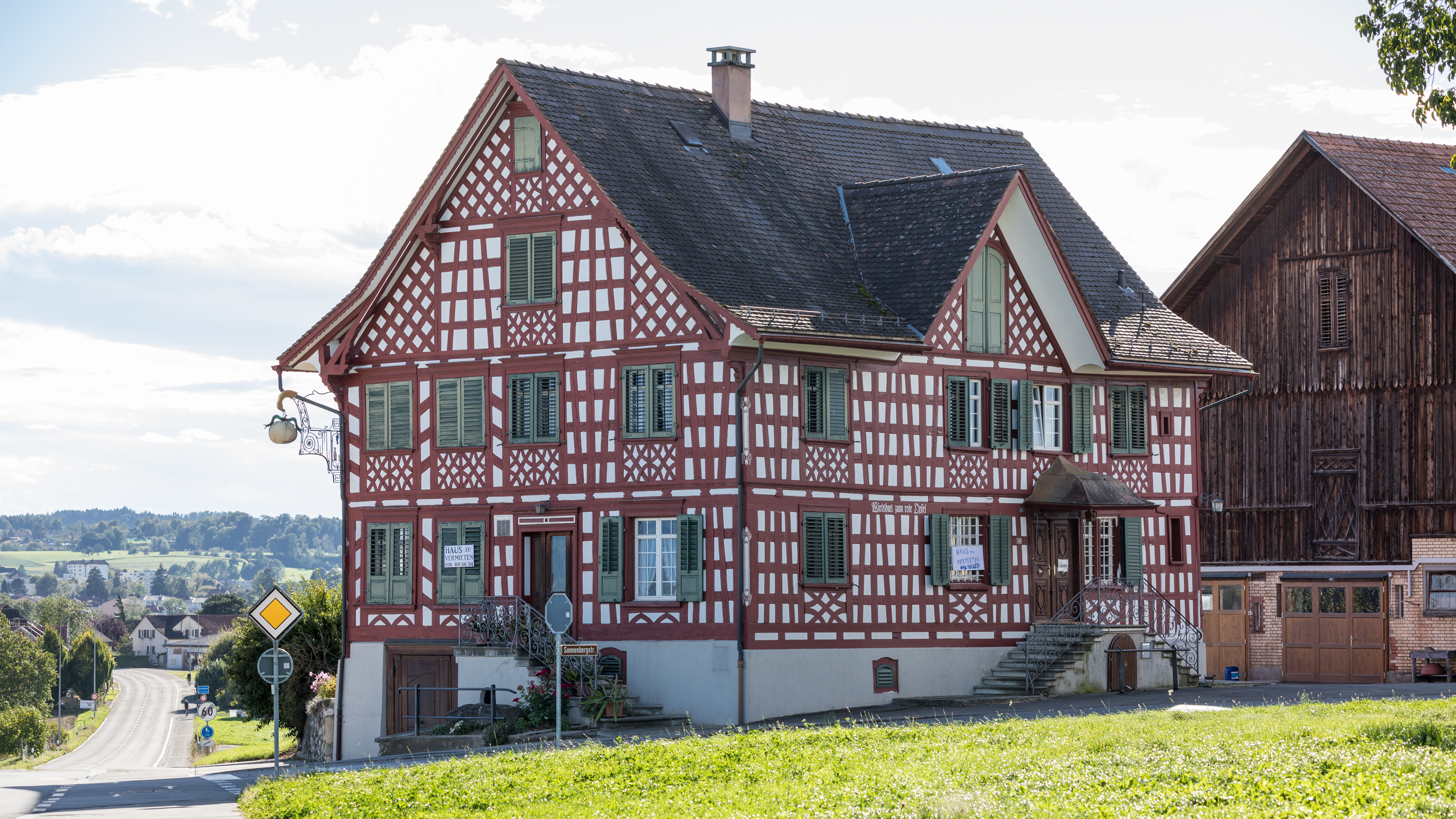

- Coat of arms
- Location of Hefenhofen
- Location within Switzerland Location within Canton of Thurgau
- Coordinates: 47°33′N 9°18′E
- Country: Switzerland
- Canton: Thurgau
- District: Arbon

Area
  - Total: 6.1 km^{2} (2.4 sq mi)
- Elevation: 451 m (1,480 ft)

Population (December 2007)
  - Total: 1,195
  - Density: 200/km^{2} (510/sq mi)
- Time zone: UTC+01:00 (CET)
  - Summer (DST): UTC+02:00 (CEST)
- Postal code: 8580
- SFOS number: 4416
- ISO 3166 code: CH-TG
- Surrounded by: Amriswil, Dozwil, Kesswil, Romanshorn, Salmsach, Sommeri, Uttwil
- Website: www.hefenhofen.ch

Hefenhofen is a municipality in the district of Arbon in the canton of Thurgau in Switzerland.

== History ==
Hefenhofen is first mentioned in 817 as Hebinhova. Hefenhofen was a fief of the Abbey of Saint Gall and until the 17th century it was part of the Bailiwick of Hagenwil. In 1600, the low court of Hefenhofen was formed, which included Auenhofen, Hatswil, Moos and Tonhub. In 1644 the Lords of Bernhausen divided their lands, which included Hefenhofen. From 1644 until 1798 a number of different individuals owned the village.

Since the Protestant Reformation Hefenhofen had belonged to the Reformed parish of Sommeri. In 1870, the political and geographic municipalities were merged into the combined municipality of Hefenhofen.

In the 19th century the major economic activities included fruit production and weaving. Towards the end of the 19th century, this transitioned to cattle and dairy farming. In 1900 Hefenhofen included several farms and silk embroidery industry. The only heavy industry in Hefenhofen until 1950, was the Stutz construction business founded in 1877 (in 2003 it had approximately 260 employees) and the Hatswil mill. Opened in 1975, the municipal solid waste incinerator of the Oberthurgau region, closed their doors in 1996.

== Geography ==
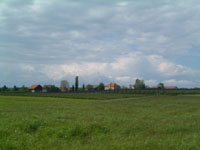
Hefenhofen seen from the Sonnenberg

Hefenhofen has an area, as of 2009, of 6.05 square kilometers (2.34 sq mi). Of this area, 4.15 km^{2} (1.60 sq mi) or 68.6% is used for agricultural purposes, while 1.23 km^{2} (0.47 sq mi) or 20.3% is forested. Of the rest of the land, 0.76 km^{2} (0.29 sq mi) or 12.6% is settled (buildings or roads).

Of the built up area, industrial buildings made up 6.1% of the total area while housing and buildings made up 1.2% and transportation infrastructure made up 1.2%. while parks, green belts and sports fields made up 4.1%. Out of the forested land, 17.9% of the total land area is heavily forested and 2.5% is covered with orchards or small clusters of trees. Of the agricultural land, 50.9% is used for growing crops, while 17.7% is used for orchards or vine crops.

The municipality is located in the Arbon district, north of Amriswil. It consists of the village of Hefenhofen and the hamlets of Auenhofen, Hatswil, Kressibuch and other hamlets. Between 1816-1936 Niederaach belonged to Hefenhofen.

== Demographics ==
Hefenhofen has a population (as of December 2020) of 1,277. As of 2008, 9.1% of the population are foreign nationals. Over the last 10 years (1997–2007) the population has changed at a rate of 3.6%. Most of the population (as of 2000) speaks German (96.6%), with Italian being second most common (0.9%) and French being third (0.5%).

As of 2008, the gender distribution of the population was 50.9% male and 49.1% female. The population was made up of 542 Swiss men (45.7% of the population), and 61 (5.1%) non-Swiss men. There were 535 Swiss women (45.1%), and 47 (4.0%) non-Swiss women. In 2008 there were 7 live births to Swiss citizens and 2 births to non-Swiss citizens, and in same time span there were 12 deaths of Swiss citizens. Ignoring immigration and emigration, the population of Swiss citizens decreased by 5 while the foreign population increased by 2. There were 9 non-Swiss men who emigrated from Switzerland to another country and 1 non-Swiss woman who emigrated from Switzerland to another country. The total Swiss population change in 2008 (from all sources) was a decrease of 20 and the non-Swiss population change was an increase of 10 people. This represents a population growth rate of -0.8%.

The age distribution, as of 2009, in Hefenhofen is; 117 children or 10.1% of the population are between 0 and 9 years old and 202 teenagers or 17.5% are between 10 and 19. Of the adult population, 119 people or 10.3% of the population are between 20 and 29 years old. 121 people or 10.5% are between 30 and 39, 225 people or 19.5% are between 40 and 49, and 180 people or 15.6% are between 50 and 59. The senior population distribution is 81 people or 7.0% of the population are between 60 and 69 years old, 69 people or 6.0% are between 70 and 79, there are 34 people or 2.9% who are between 80 and 89, and there are 6 people or 0.5% who are 90 and older.

As of 2000, there were 413 private households in the municipality, and an average of 2.6 persons per household. In 2000 there were 190 single family homes (or 81.2% of the total) out of a total of 234 inhabited buildings. There were 22 two family buildings (9.4%), 10 three family buildings (4.3%) and 12 multi-family buildings (or 5.1%). There were 220 (or 19.9%) persons who were part of a couple without children, and 671 (or 60.6%) who were part of a couple with children. There were 54 (or 4.9%) people who lived in single parent home, while there are 8 persons who were adult children living with one or both parents, 4 persons who lived in a household made up of relatives, 12 who lived in a household made up of unrelated persons, and 22 who are either institutionalized or live in another type of collective housing.

The vacancy rate for the municipality, in 2008, was 0%. As of 2007, the construction rate of new housing units was 3.3 new units per 1000 residents. In 2000 there were 455 apartments in the municipality. The most common apartment size was the 6 room apartment of which there were 118. There were 9 single room apartments and 118 apartments with six or more rooms. As of 2000 the average price to rent an average apartment in Hefenhofen was 1097.16 Swiss francs (CHF) per month (US$880, £490, €700 approx. exchange rate from 2000). The average rate for a one-room apartment was 436.67 CHF (US$350, £200, €280), a two-room apartment was about 670.94 CHF (US$540, £300, €430), a three-room apartment was about 944.48 CHF (US$760, £430, €600) and a six or more room apartment cost an average of 1373.75 CHF (US$1100, £620, €880). The average apartment price in Hefenhofen was 98.3% of the national average of 1116 CHF.

In the 2007 federal election the most popular party was the SVP which received 43.55% of the vote. The next three most popular parties were the Green Party (14.08%), the SP (11.43%) and the CVP (10.83%). In the federal election, a total of 323 votes were cast, and the voter turnout was 39.0%.

The historical population is given in the following table:

year	population
1850	795
1900	873
1930	1,060
1950	913
1980	711
2000	1,108

== Economy ==
As of 2007, Hefenhofen had an unemployment rate of 1.66%. As of 2005, there were 98 people employed in the primary economic sector and about 29 businesses involved in this sector. 151 people are employed in the secondary sector and there are 20 businesses in this sector. 124 people are employed in the tertiary sector, with 32 businesses in this sector.

In 2000 there were 796 workers who lived in the municipality. Of these, 418 or about 52.5% of the residents worked outside Hefenhofen while 317 people commuted into the municipality for work. There were a total of 695 jobs (of at least 6 hours per week) in the municipality. Of the working population, 5.8% used public transportation to get to work, and 52.7% used a private car.

== Religion ==
From the 2000 census, 382 or 34.5% were Roman Catholic, while 507 or 45.8% belonged to the Swiss Reformed Church. Of the rest of the population, there were 5 Old Catholics (or about 0.45% of the population) who belonged to the Christian Catholic Church of Switzerland there is 1 individual who belongs to the Orthodox Church, and there are 64 individuals (or about 5.78% of the population) who belong to another Christian church. There were 18 (or about 1.62% of the population) who are Islamic. There are 2 individuals (or about 0.18% of the population) who belong to another church (not listed on the census), 97 (or about 8.75% of the population) belong to no church, are agnostic or atheist, and 32 individuals (or about 2.89% of the population) did not answer the question.

== Education ==
The entire Swiss population is generally well educated. In Hefenhofen about 74.8% of the population (between age 25-64) have completed either non-mandatory upper secondary education or additional higher education (either university or a Fachhochschule).
