= Thurgau =

Canton of Switzerland

- Canton
- Canton of Thurgau; Kanton Thurgau (German)
- Flag Coat of arms

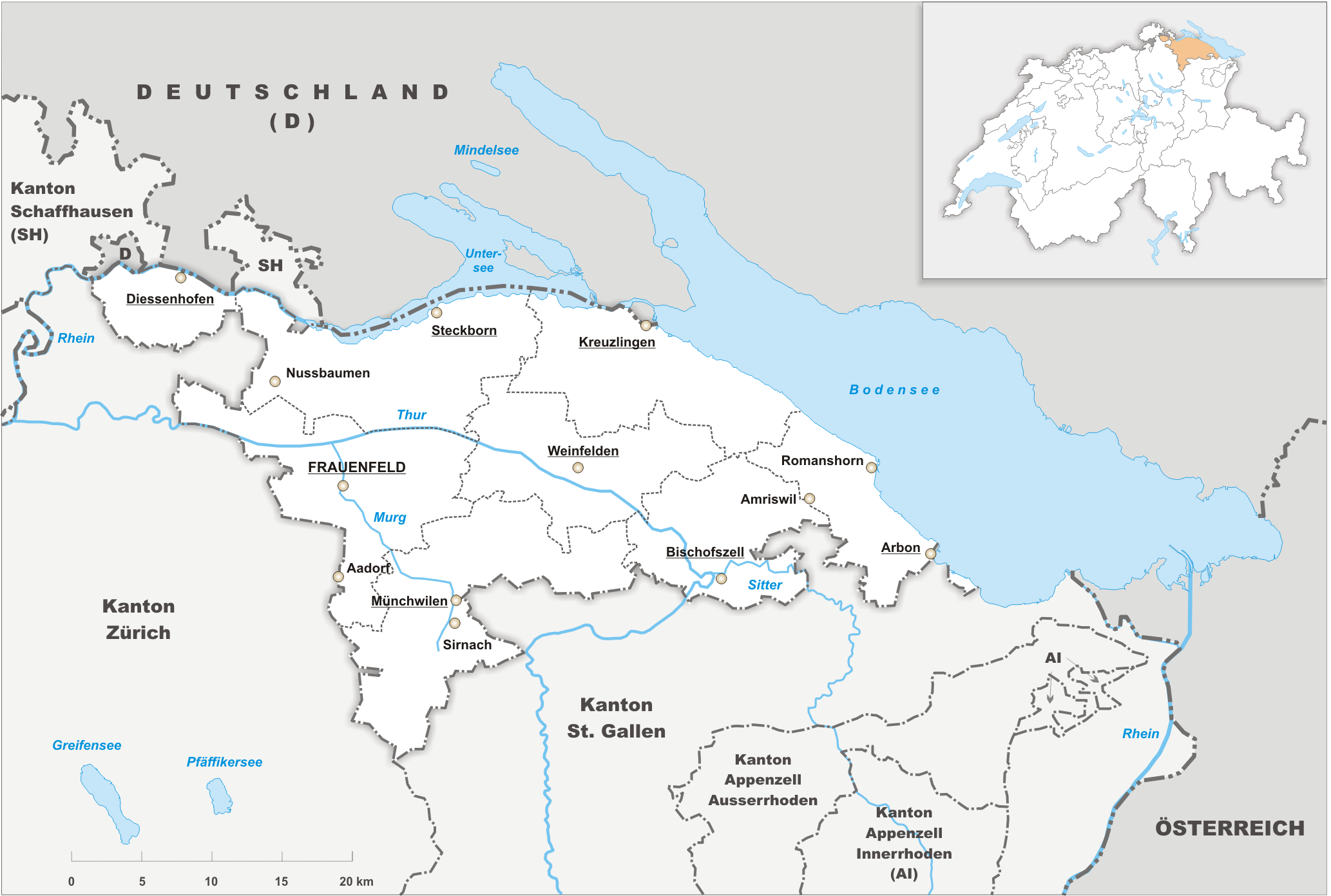
- Location in Switzerland Map of Thurgau
- Coordinates: 47°35′N 9°4′E
- Country: Switzerland
- Capital: Frauenfeld
- Subdivisions: 80 municipalities, 5 districts

Government
  - President: Walter Schönholzer
  - Executive: Regierungsrat (5)
  - Legislative: Grosser Rat (130)

Area
  - Total: 991.77 km^{2} (382.92 sq mi)

Population (December 2020)
  - Total: 282,909
  - Density: 285.26/km^{2} (738.81/sq mi)

GDP
  - Total: CHF 17.208 billion (2020)
  - Per capita: CHF 61,190 (2020)
- ISO 3166 code: CH-TG
- Highest point: 991 m (3,251 ft): Hohgrat
- Lowest point: 370 m (1,214 ft): Thur at the cantonal border in Neunforn
- Joined: 1803
- Languages: German
- Website: www.tg.ch

Thurgau (/ˈtʊərɡaʊ/ TOOR-gow, Swiss Standard German: [ˈtuːrɡaʊ]; French: Thurgovie; Italian: Turgovia; Romansh: Turgovia), anglicized as Thurgovia, and formally as the Canton of Thurgau, is one of the 26 cantons forming the Swiss Confederation. It is composed of five districts. Its capital is Frauenfeld.

Thurgau is part of Eastern Switzerland. It is named after the river Thur, and the name Thurgovia was historically used for a larger area, including part of this river's basin upstream of the modern canton. The area of what is now Thurgau was acquired as subject territories by the cantons of the Old Swiss Confederacy from the mid 15th century. Thurgau was first declared a canton in its own right at the formation of the Helvetic Republic in 1798.

The population, as of December 2020, is 282,909. In 2007, there were a total of 47,390 resident foreigners, constituting 19.9% of the population.

== History ==
In prehistoric times (Neolithic), the lands of the canton were inhabited by people of the Pfyn culture, named after Pfyn, along Lake Constance. During Roman times the canton was part of the province Raetia until 450, when the Alemanni settled on the lands. Roman settlements in Thurgau include Ad Fines (Pfyn), Arbor Felix and Tasgetium.

In the sixth century, Thurgovia became a Gau of Francia as part of Alamannia, passing to the Duchy of Swabia in the early 10th century. At this time, Thurgovia included not just what is now the canton of Thurgau, but also much of the territory of the modern canton of St. Gallen, the Appenzell and the eastern parts of the canton of Zurich.

The most important cities of Thurgovia in the early medieval period were Konstanz, as the seat of the bishop, and St. Gallen for the Abbey of Saint Gall.

The dukes of the House of Zähringen and the counts of the Kyburg family took over much of the land in the High Middle Ages. The town of Zurich was part of the Thurgau until it became reichsunmittelbar in 1218. When the Kyburg dynasty became extinct in 1264, the House of Habsburg took over that land.

The Old Swiss Confederacy, allied with ten freed bailiwicks of the former Toggenburg, seized the lands of the Thurgau from the Habsburgs in 1460, and it became a subject territory of seven Swiss cantons (Zurich, Lucerne, Uri, Schwyz, Unterwalden, Zug and Glarus).

During the Protestant Reformation in Switzerland, both the Catholic and emerging Reformed parties sought to swing the subject territories, such as the Thurgau, to their side. In 1524, in an incident that resonated across Switzerland, local peasants occupied the cloister of Ittingen in Thurgau, driving out monks, destroying documents, and devastating the wine-cellar. Between 1526 and 1531, most of the Thurgau's population adopted the new Reformed faith spreading from Zurich; Zurich's defeat in the 1531 Second War of Kappel ended Reformed predominance. Instead, the First Peace of Kappel protected both Catholic and Reformed worship, though the provisions of the treaty generally favored the Catholics, who also made up a majority among the seven ruling cantons. Religious tensions over the Thurgau were an important background to the First War of Villmergen (1656), during which Zurich briefly occupied the Thurgau.

In 1798, the land became a canton for the first time as part of the Helvetic Republic. In 1803, as part of the Act of Mediation, the canton of Thurgau became a member of the Swiss confederation. The cantonal coat of arms was designed in 1803, based on the coat of arms of the Kyburg family, which ruled the Thurgau in the 13th century, changing the background to green-and-white, at the time considered "revolutionary" colours (cf. tricolour); as the placement of a yellow (or) charge on white (argent) is a violation of heraldic principles, there have been suggestions to modify the design, including a 1938 suggestion to use a solid green field divided by a diagonal white line, but they were unsuccessful.

On March 26, 1806, Thurgau became the first state in the world to introduce compulsory smallpox vaccinations, by order of the cantonal councillor Jakob Christoph Scherb.

The current cantonal constitution of Thurgau dates from 1987.

== Geography ==
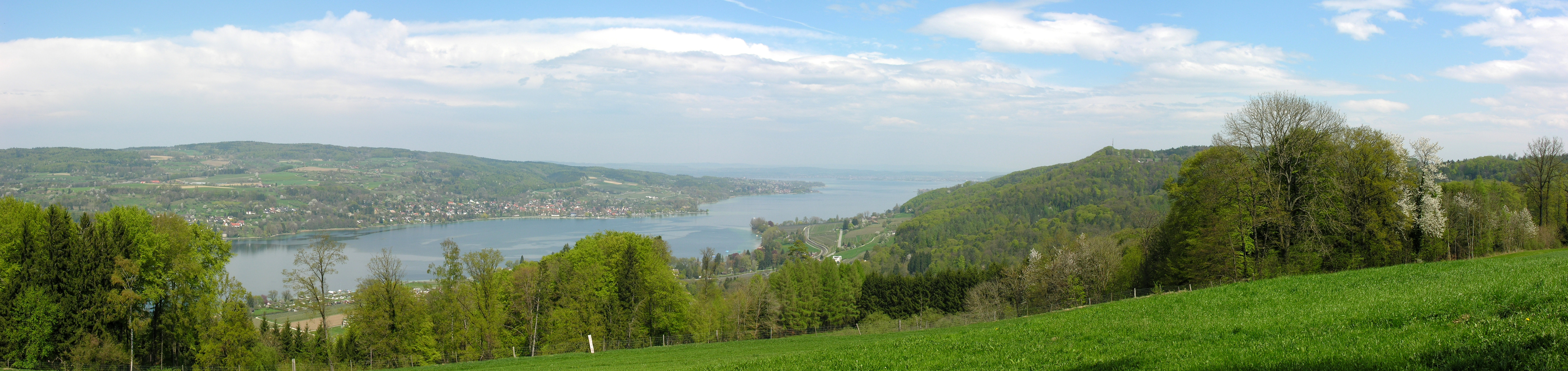
View of Untersee (Lake Constance) near Eschenz with the German shore beyond. Lake Constance and the river Rhine mark the northern border of the canton

To the north the canton is bound by Lake Constance (Bodensee) across which lies Germany (Baden-Württemberg and Bavaria) and Austria (Vorarlberg). The High Rhine (Hochrhein) and the western part of the Seerhein create the border in the northwest. To the south lies the canton of St. Gallen; to the west lies the canton of Zurich and to the northwest, across the High Rhine, the canton of Schaffhausen. Horn is an exclave of the canton of Thurgau.

The main river is the Thur, with other important rivers being the Murg, Aach, and Sitter. There are several small lakes, such as Bichelsee, Bommer Weiher, Hasensee, Hüttwilersee, and Nussbaumersee. Werd, the largest of the Werd islands at the outflow of Lake Constance, is located in the canton of Thurgau. Another island, Entlibühl, ceased to exist.

The canton is located in the Swiss Plateau. Having an area of 991 km^{2} (383 sq mi), it is commonly divided into three hill masses. One of these, the Seerücken, stretches along the shores of Lake Constance in the north. Another one, which includes the Immenberg, is further inland between the rivers Thur and Murg. The third one forms the southern border of the canton and merges with the Hohgrat, the canton's highest mountain, and Hörnli in the Prealps (or Appenzell Alps).

== Demographics ==
The population of the canton (as of 31 December 2020) is 282,909. The canton is mostly German speaking. The population (as of 2000) is split between Protestants (45%) and Roman Catholics (36%).

=== Historical population ===
The historical population is given in the following table:

Historic Population Data
Year	Total Population	Swiss	Non-Swiss	Population share of total country
1850	88 908	87 006	1 902	3.7%
1880	99 231	92 120	7 111	3.5%
1900	113 221	98 183	15 038	3.4%
1950	149 738	139 990	9 748	3.2%
1970	182 835	148 792	34 043	2.9%
2000	228 875	183 942	44 933	3.1%
2020	282,909			3.3%

== Political subdivisions ==
=== Districts ===
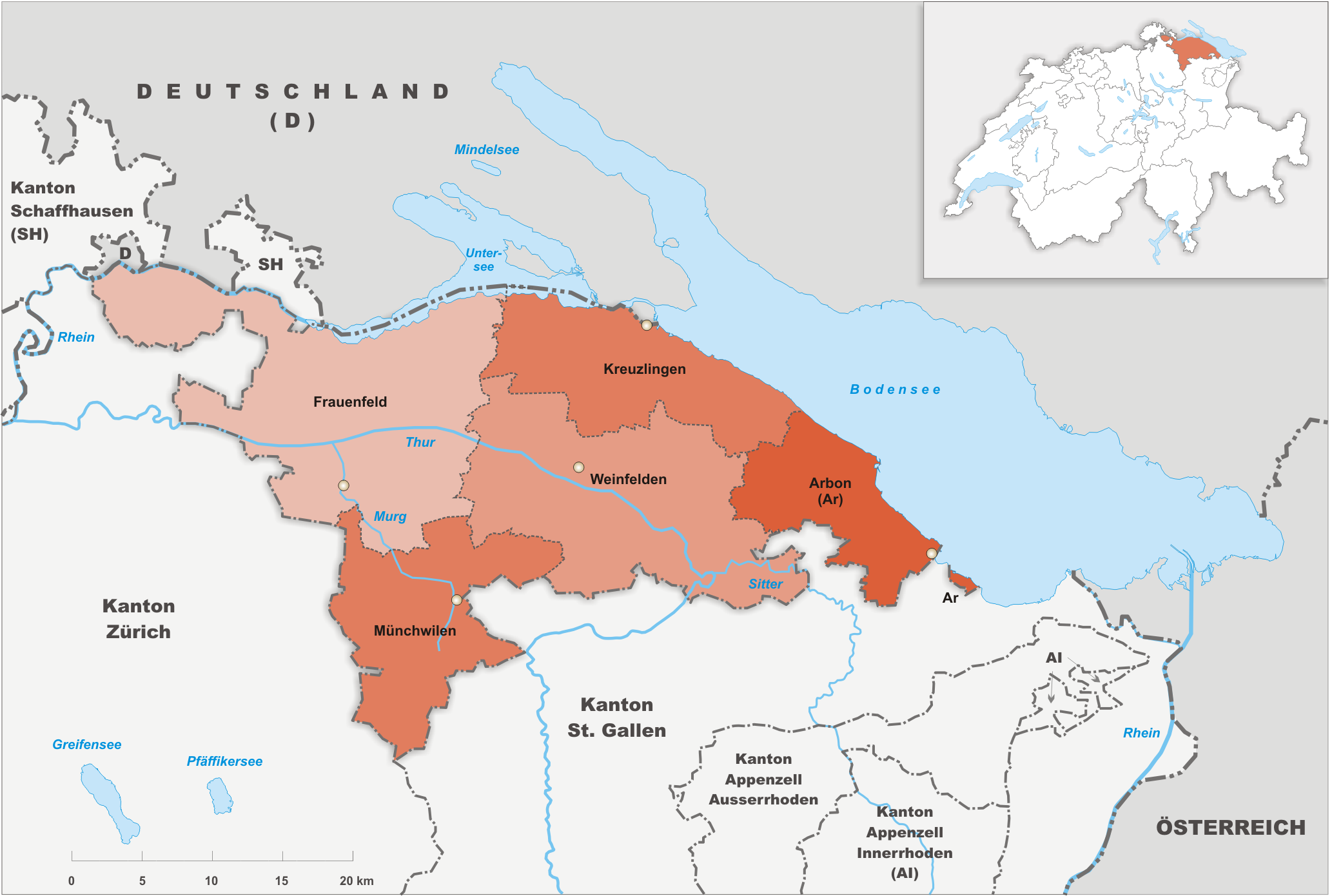
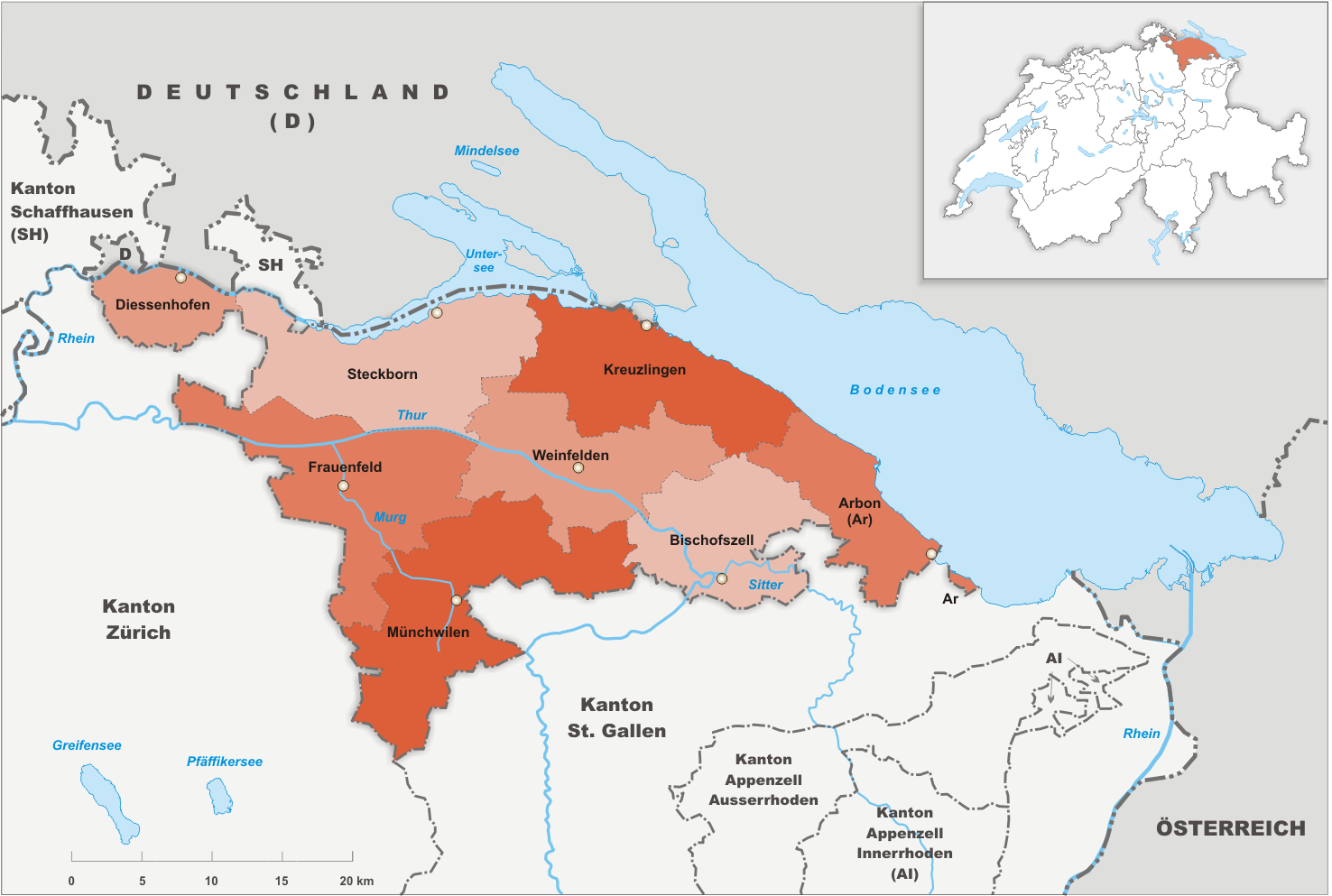
The five districts, since 2011 (left), and the eight former districts, prior to 2011 (right)

Since January 2011, Thurgau has been divided into five districts which are named after their capitals. Before this date, there were eight districts - (Steckborn District, Bischofszell District and Diessenhofen District formed their own districts with their surrounding municipalities).

- Frauenfeld District with capital Frauenfeld
- Kreuzlingen District with capital Kreuzlingen
- Weinfelden District with capital Weinfelden
- Münchwilen District with capital Münchwilen
- Arbon District with capital Arbon

=== Municipalities ===
As of 2009, there are 80 municipalities in the canton. The ten largest municipalities by population are:

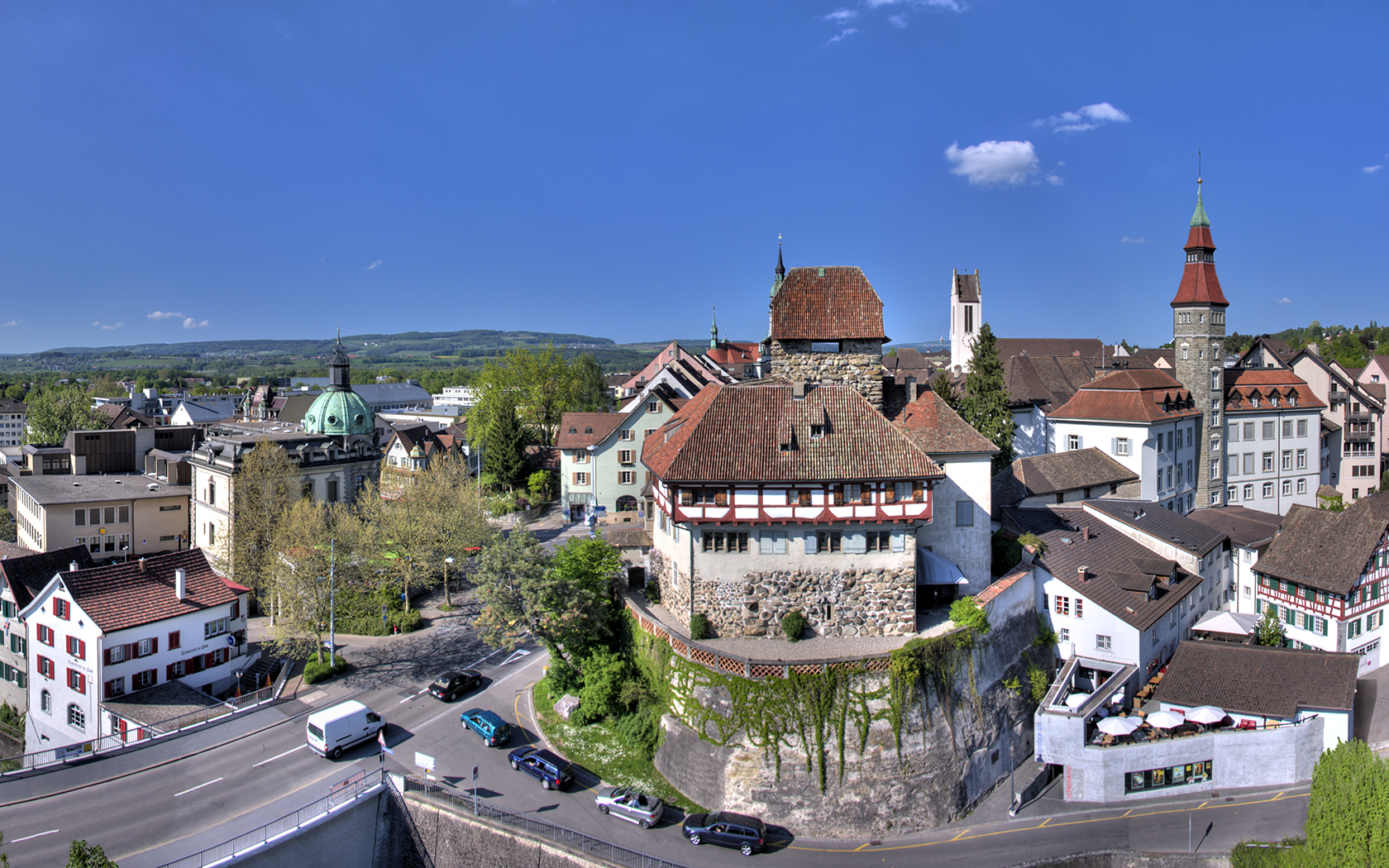
1. Frauenfeld - population 25,974

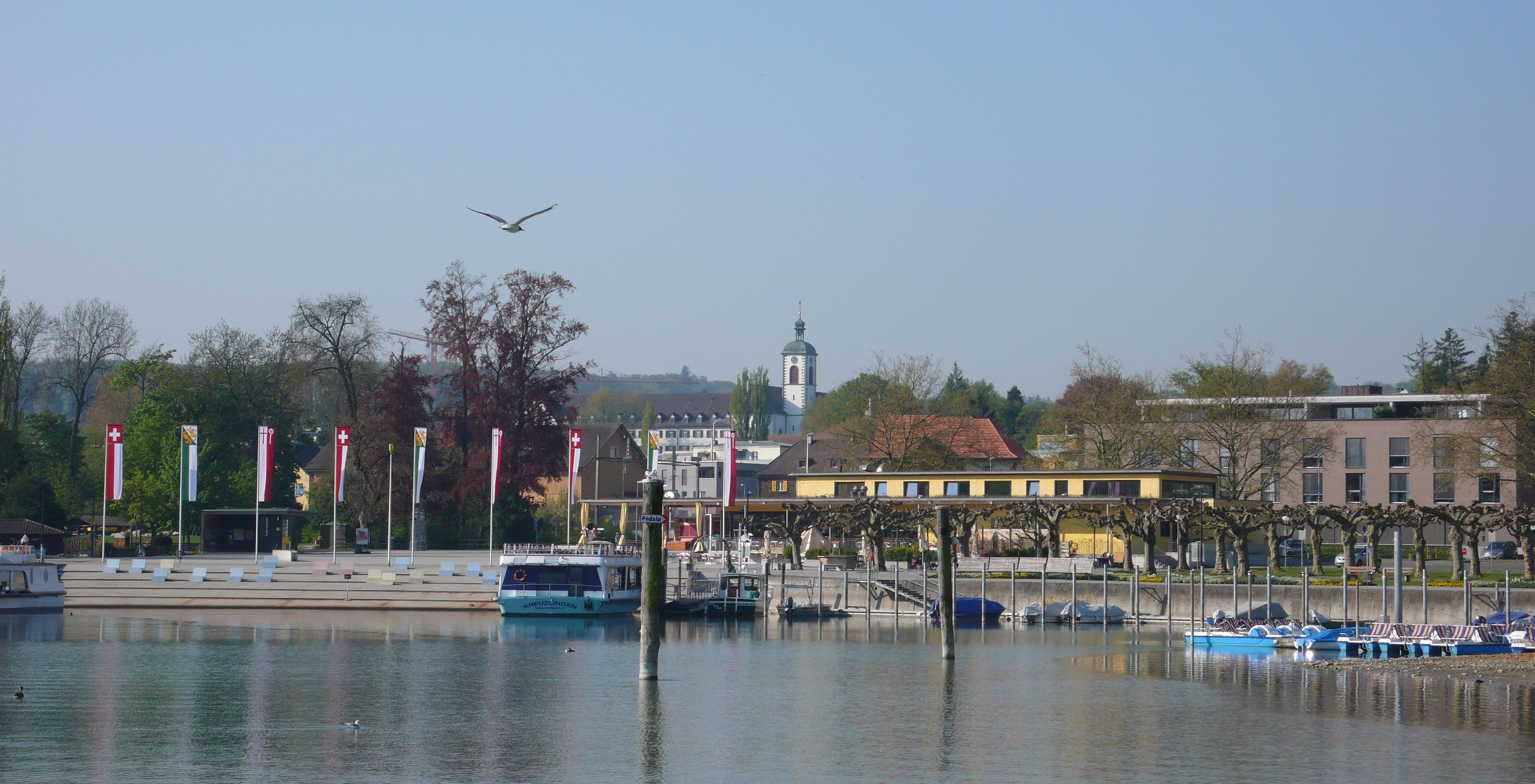
2. Kreuzlingen - population 22,390

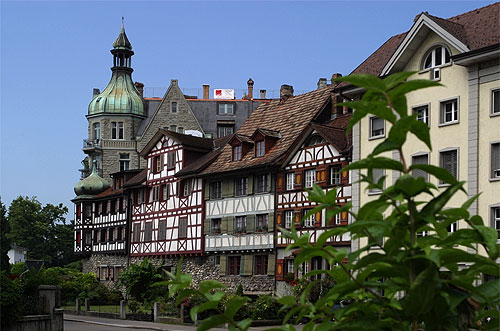
3. Arbon - population 14,950

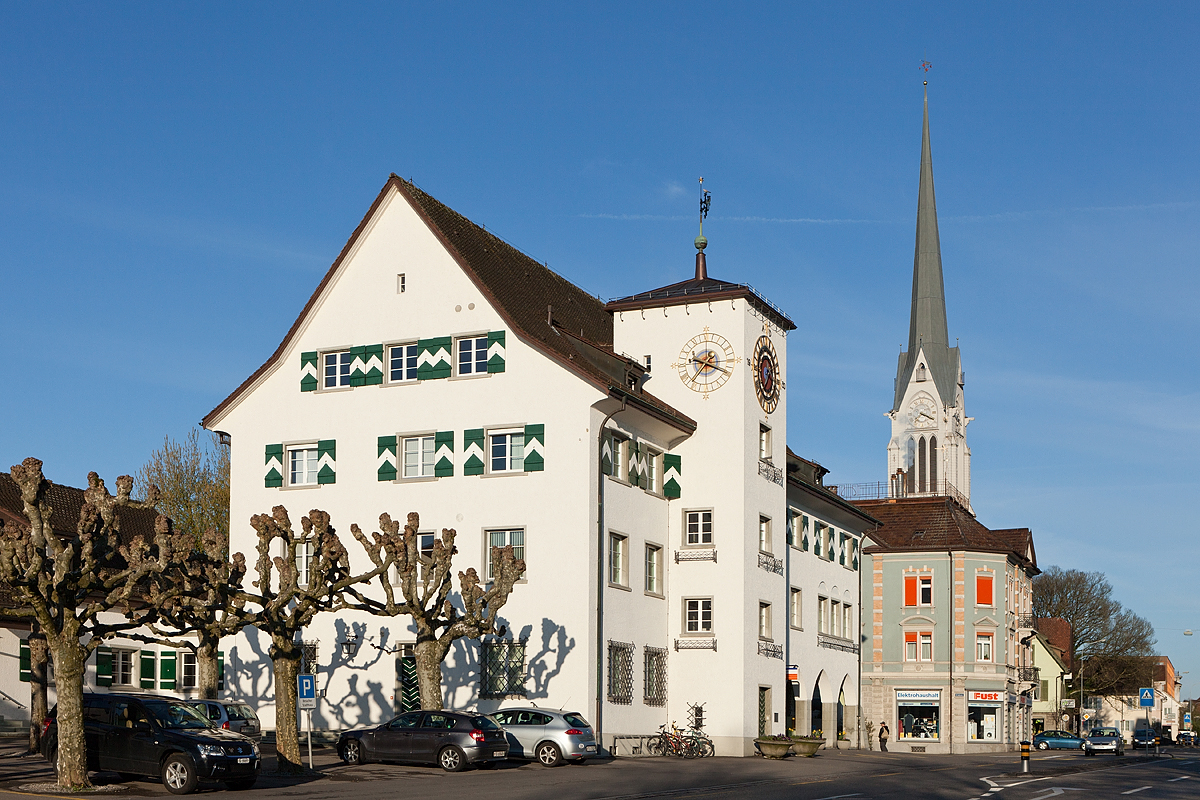
4. Amriswil - population 14,211

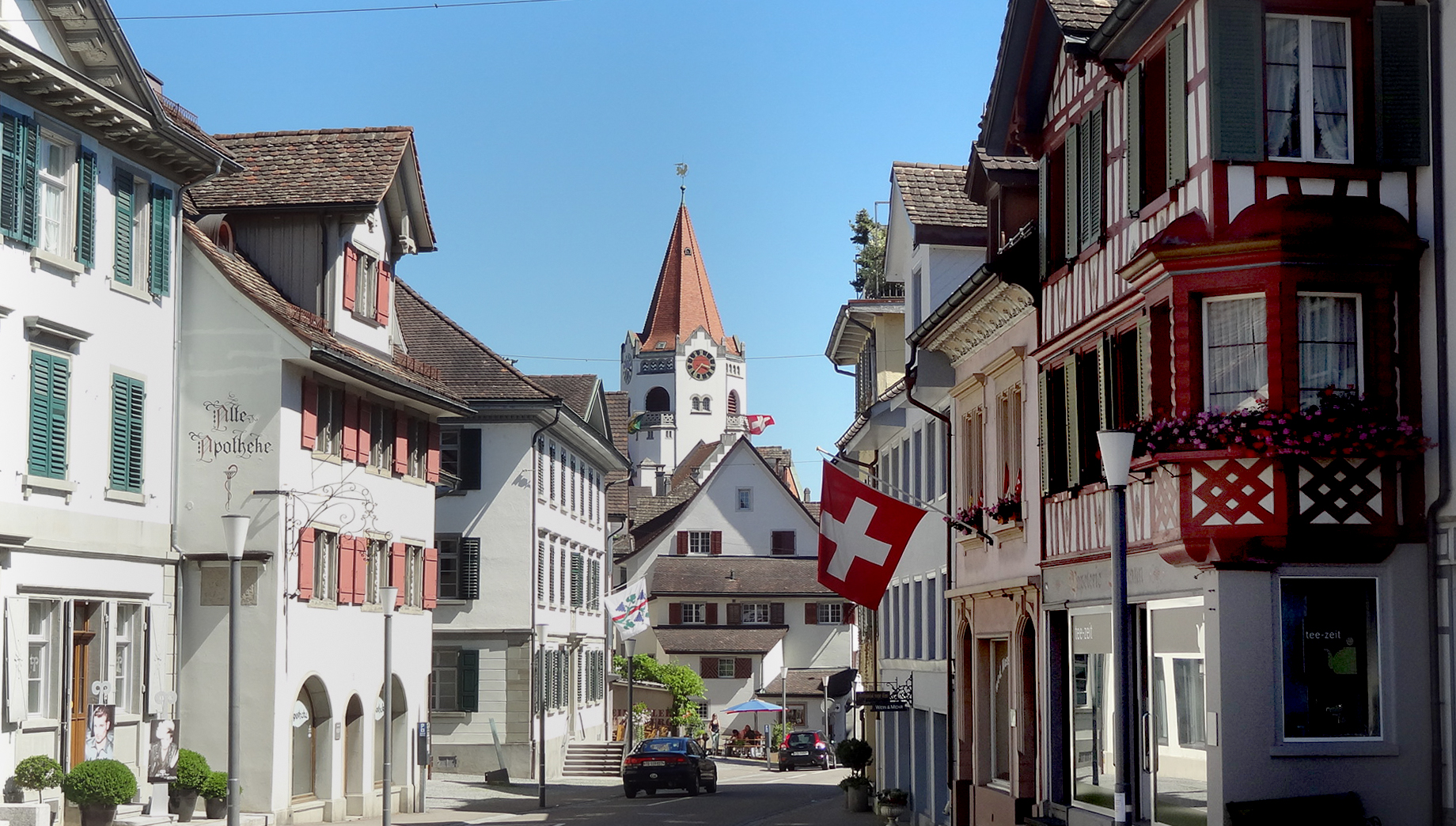
5. Weinfelden - population 11,629

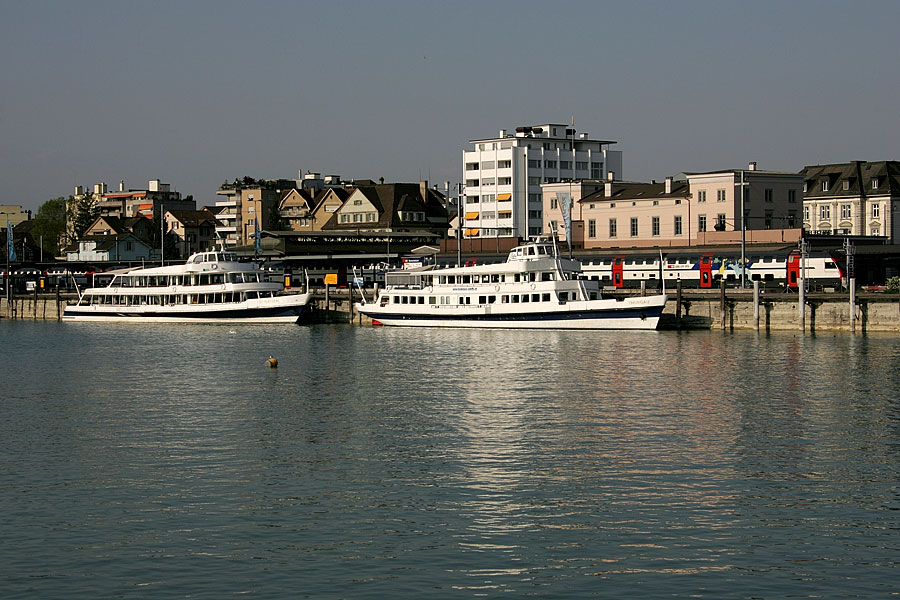
6. Romanshorn - population 11,327

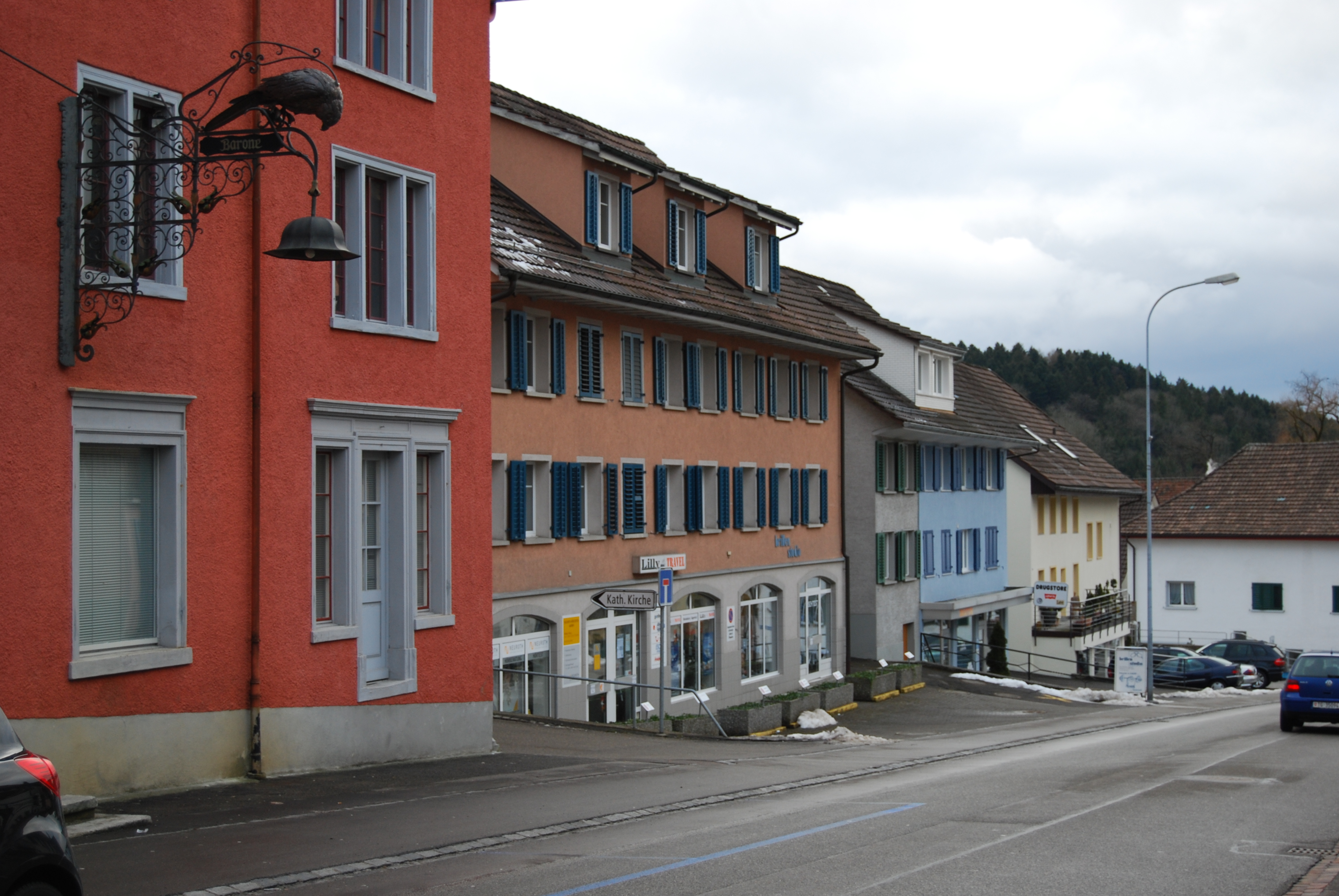
7. Aadorf - population 9,216

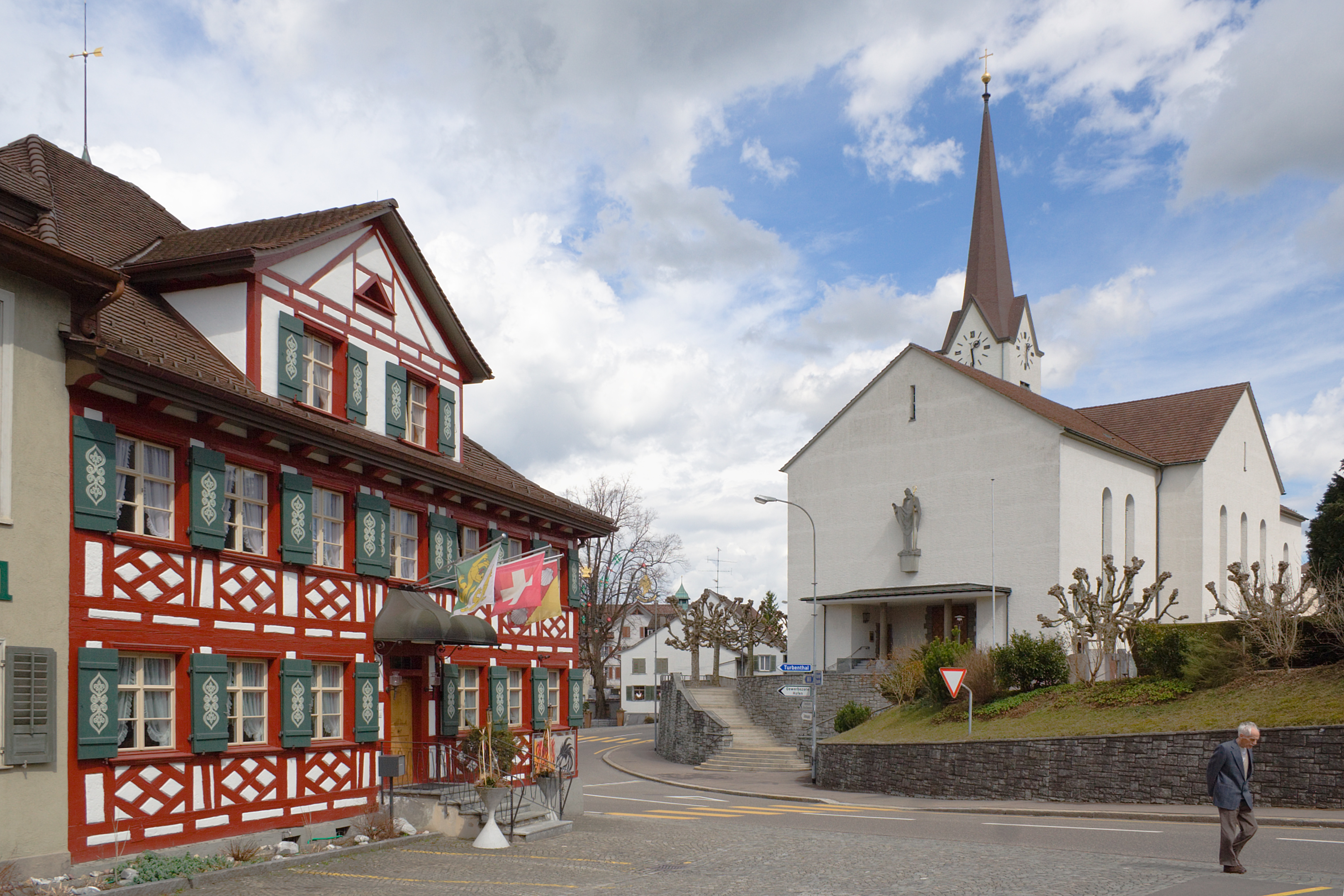
8. Sirnach - population 7,901

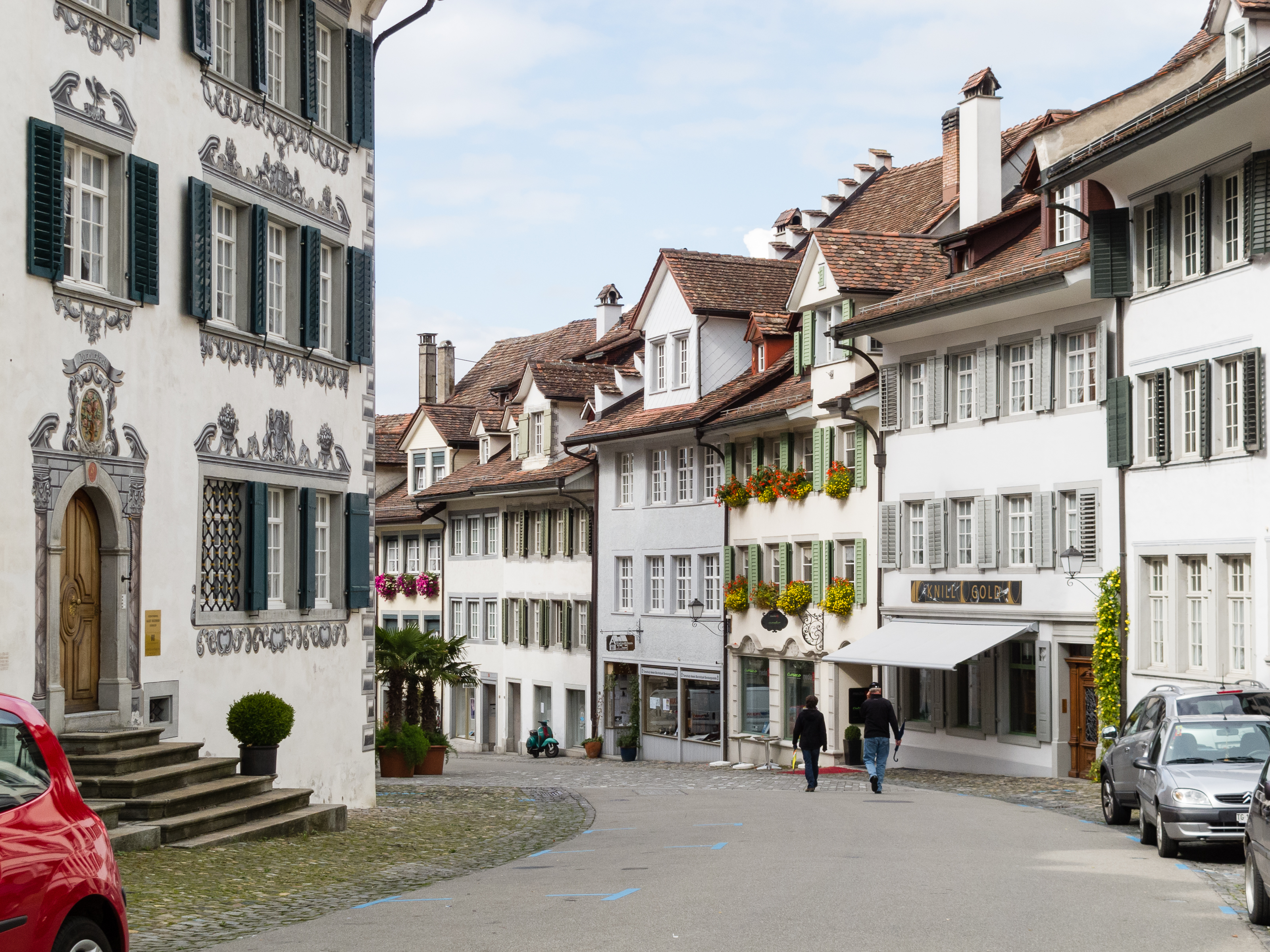
9. Bischofszell - population 5,907

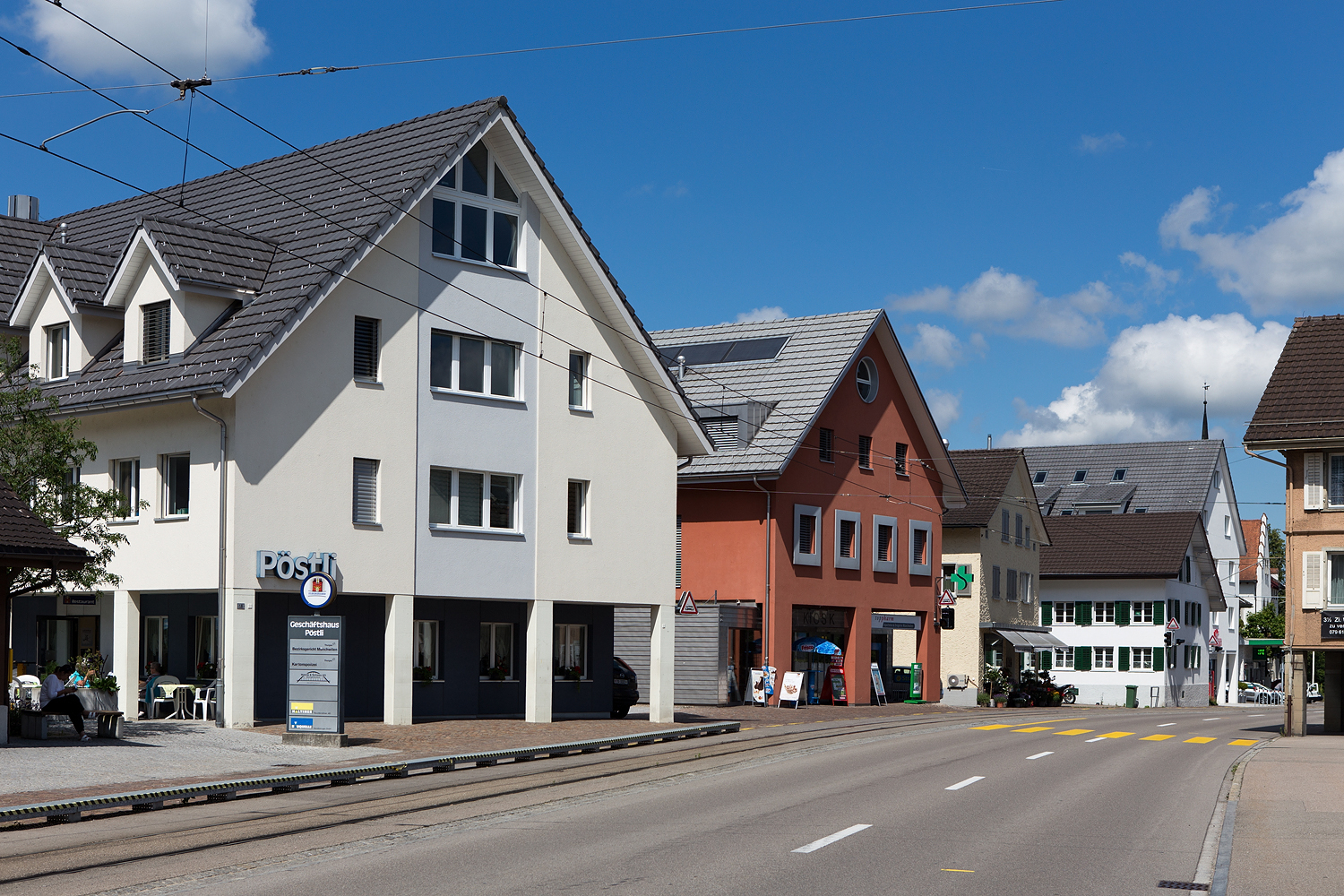
10. Münchwilen - population 5,830

== Politics ==
=== Federal election results ===
Percentage of the total vote per party in the canton in the National Council Elections 1971–2019
Party	Ideology	1971	1975	1979	1983	1987	1991	1995	1999	2003	2007	2011	2015	2019
FDP.The Liberals^{a}	Classical liberalism	16.9	14.4	16.9	18.3	18.5	16.5	15.3	14.7	11.9	12.1	11.2	13.0	11.5
CVP/PDC/PPD/PCD	Christian democracy	23.4	22.3	24.6	21.6	20.4	16.5	13.0	15.7	16.5	15.2	14.4	13.1	12.7
SP/PS	Social democracy	20.7	21.6	22.4	19.5	13.4	15.1	18.1	16.1	14.1	11.7	12.1	12.7	12.6
SVP/UDC	Swiss nationalism	26.0	25.1	26.4	22.8	21.7	23.7	27.0	33.2	41.0	42.3	38.7	39.9	36.7
Ring of Independents	Social liberalism	* ^{b}	6.6	5.3	3.9	2.6	3.3	*	*	*	*	*	*	*
EVP/PEV	Christian democracy	*	*	*	5.3	*	3.2	2.7	2.8	2.7	2.8	2.9	2.3	2.7
GLP/PVL	Green liberalism	*	*	*	*	*	*	*	*	*	*	5.2	6.2	8.1
BDP/PBD	Conservatism	*	*	*	*	*	*	*	*	*	*	5.0	3.8	2.3
POCH	Progressivism	*	*	*	*	0.2	*	*	*	*	*	*	*	*
GPS/PES	Green politics	*	*	*	5.9	10.8	9.0	9.3	6.2	7.9	10.2	7.0	5.4	10.6
SD/DS	National conservatism	4.2	2.5	1.9	2.7	*	3.5	4.8	2.5	2.9	1.9	*	*	*
Rep.	Right-wing populism	8.8	7.6	2.0	*	*	*	*	*	*	*	*	*	*
EDU/UDF	Christian right	*	*	*	*	*	*	*	1.9	1.9	2.6	3.5	3.4	2.8
FPS/PSL	Right-wing populism	*	*	*	*	6.4	8.7	8.0	2.7	0.3	*	*	*	*
Other		*	*	0.4	*	6.0	0.5	1.9	4.3	0.7	1.1	*	0.2	
Voter participation %		62.0	56.6	48.3	52.7	48.5	47.1	44.1	44.6	42.9	46.9	46.7	46.6	42.4

^a FDP before 2009, FDP.The Liberals after 2009
^b "*" indicates that the party was not on the ballot in this canton.

== Economy ==
The canton of Thurgau is known for its agricultural produce. Particularly, apples, pears. The many orchards in the canton are mainly used for the production of cider. Wine is produced in the Thur valley.

There is also industry in the canton of Thurgau (e.g. Stadler Rail in Bussnang). The main industries are printing, textiles and handicrafts. Small and middle-sized businesses are important for the cantonal economy. Many of these are concentrated around the capital.

== Transport ==
Regional rail in Thurgau and neighbouring areas is provided by St. Gallen S-Bahn and Zurich S-Bahn (in part also Bodensee S-Bahn). Nodal railway stations such as Frauenfeld, Kreuzlingen, Romanshorn and Weinfelden are additionally served by long-distance InterCity and/or InterRegio trains. PostAuto and other bus operators serve towns and villages within the canton. Rail and bus services operate within the Ostwind tariff network.

The Schweizerische Schifffahrtsgesellschaft Untersee und Rhein (URh) operates boat cruises on the High Rhine and Untersee (Lake Constance). A car ferry across Lake Constance links Romanshorn with Friedrichshafen in Germany. Until 1976, train ferries connected Romanshorn with several other ports. Passenger boats along the Swiss shore of Lake Constance and the Alter Rhein ("Old Rhine") are operated by Schweizerische Bodensee-Schifffahrt.

The nearest airports are St. Gallen–Altenrhein Airport and Zurich Airport.

The canton is traversed by the A1 and A7 motorways, and the Hauptstrasse 13.
