= Ragatz =

Coordinates: 47°0′12.23″N 9°30′7.74″E

Ragatz, also known as "Old Baths Pfäfers" or "Old Baths of Pfäfersin" in the 19th century and earlier, was a famous watering-place in the Swiss village of Bad Ragaz, situated on the left bank of the Rhine, and by rail 22 km north of Coire or 98 km S.E. of Zürich. It stood at a height of 509 m, at the entrance to the magnificent gorge of the Tamina, about 5 km up which by carriage road were the extraordinarily placed Baths of Pfafers (674 m). Since 1840 the hot mineral waters of Pfäfers were conducted in pipes to Ragatz, which is in a more pleasant position. Consequently, Ragatz much increased in importance since that date. In the churchyard is the grave of the philosopher Friedrich Schelling (d. here in 1854).

About 3 km by road above Ragatz are the 17th-century buildings of the great Benedictine monastery, Pfäfers Abbey, to which all this region belonged until 1798; midway between them and Ragatz are the ruins of the 14th-century castle of Wartenstein.

The monastery and baths were, after 1969, converted into museums and are open to the public.

Johanna Spyri's classic book Heidi is briefly set in Ragatz.
