= Sarganserland =

Coordinates: 47°25′35″N 9°22′34″E

Sarganserland Wahlkreis Sarganserland
- Constituency
- Country: Switzerland
- Canton: St. Gallen
- Capital: Sargans

Area
  - Total: 517.92 km^{2} (199.97 sq mi)

Population (December 2020)
  - Total: 41,490
  - Density: 80.11/km^{2} (207.5/sq mi)
- Time zone: UTC+1 (CET)
  - Summer (DST): UTC+2 (CEST)
- Municipalities: 8

The Sarganserland is a constituency (Wahlkreis) of the canton of St. Gallen, Switzerland, with a population of 36,892 (as of 2008).

The constituency corresponds to the historical county of Sargans (13th to 15th century) and the later Landvogtei Sargans in the Old Swiss Confederacy (15th to 18th century). Part of the Canton of Linth in the Helvetic Republic, the Sarganserland together with Pfäfers was joined to the canton of St. Gallen at its formation in 1803. Geographically, it includes the land between the Rhine at Sargans (the tripoint of St. Gallen, Grisons and Liechtenstein) and upper Lake Walen, including the Seeztal. The territory of Pfäfers lies along the Tamina, in the Rhine basin, and was not historically part of Sargans county but was independently owned by Pfäfers Abbey, and had been joined to the canton of Linth in 1798.

== Demographics ==
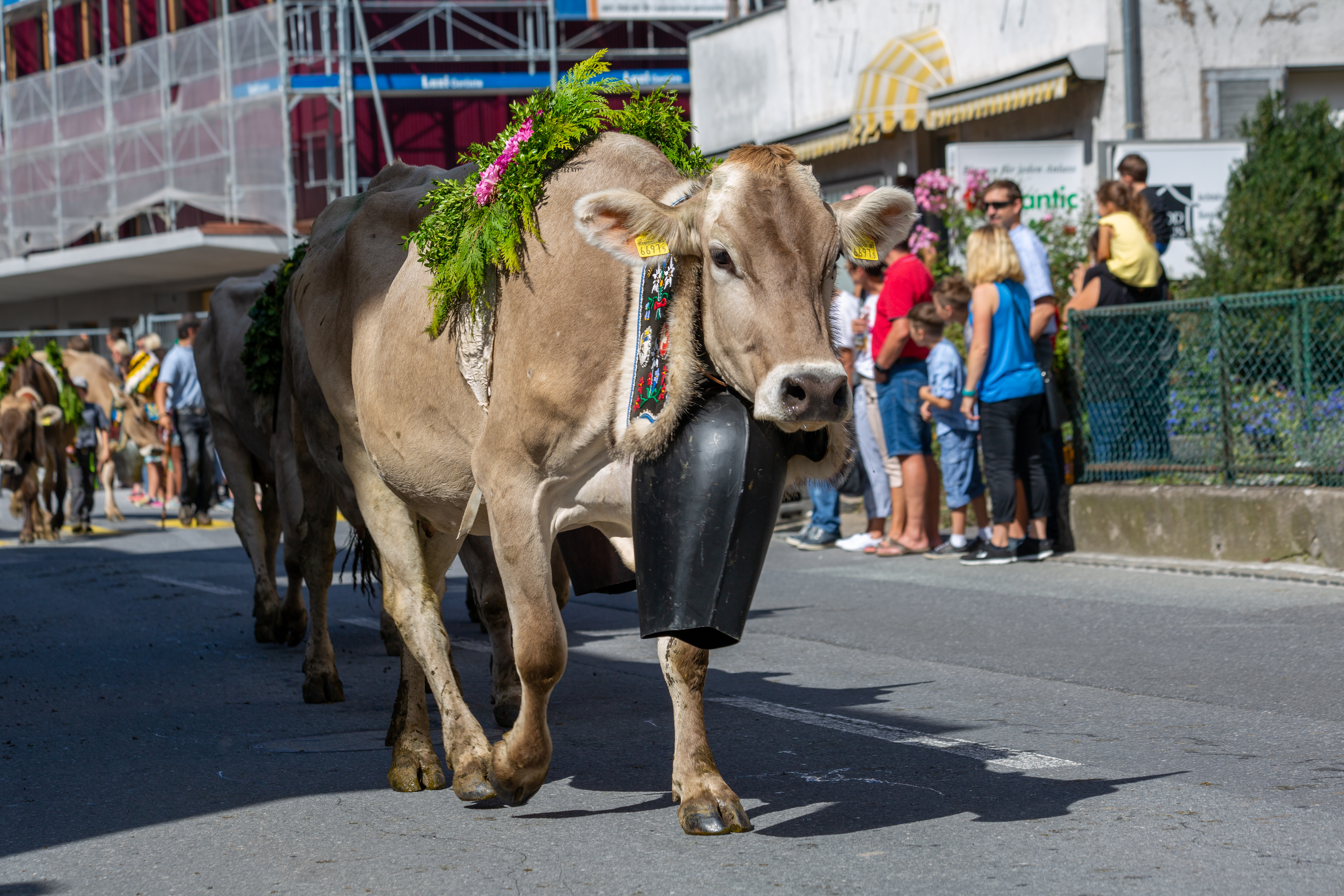
Almabtrieb at Mels in 2019.

Sarganserland Wahlkreis has a population of 41,490 (as of 31 December 2020). Of the foreign population, (as of 2000), 373 are from Germany, 854 are from Italy, 3,171 are from ex-Yugoslavia, 220 are from Austria, 350 are from Turkey, and 1,090 are from another country. Of the Swiss national languages (as of 2000), 31,401 speak German, 112 people speak French, 651 people speak Italian, and 157 people speak Romansh.

The age distribution, as of 2000, in the Sarganserland is; 4,500 children or 12.7% of the population are between 0 and 9 years old and 4,985 teenagers or 14.1% are between 10 and 19. Of the adult population, 4,329 people or 12.2% of the population are between 20 and 29 years old. 5,722 people or 16.2% are between 30 and 39, 5,002 people or 14.2% are between 40 and 49, and 4,281 people or 12.1% are between 50 and 59. The senior population distribution is 3,011 people or 8.5% of the population are between 60 and 69 years old, 2,203 people or 6.2% are between 70 and 79, there are 1,122 people or 3.2% who are between 80 and 89, and there are 184 people or 0.5% who are between 90 and 99.

In 2000 there were 4,066 persons (or 11.5% of the population) who were living alone in a private dwelling. There were 7,011 (or 19.8%) persons who were part of a couple (married or otherwise committed) without children, and 20,538 (or 58.1%) who were part of a couple with children. There were 1,799 (or 5.1%) people who lived in single parent home, while there are 273 persons who were adult children living with one or both parents, 177 persons who lived in a household made up of relatives, 187 who lived household made up of unrelated persons, and 1,288 who are either institutionalized or live in another type of collective housing.

The entire Swiss population is generally well educated. Out of the total population in the Sarganserland, as of 2000, the highest education level completed by 8,304 people (23.5% of the population) was Primary, while 12,775 (36.1%) have completed Secondary, 3,059 (8.7%) have attended a Tertiary school, and 1,656 (4.7%) are not in school. The remainder did not answer this question.

== Economy ==
As of October 2009 the average unemployment rate was 3.0%.

== Religion ==
From the 2000 census, 24,579 or 69.6% are Roman Catholic, while 4,679 or 13.2% belonged to the Swiss Reformed Church. Of the rest of the population, there are 34 individuals (or about 0.10% of the population) who belong to the Christian Catholic faith, there are 909 individuals (or about 2.57% of the population) who belong to the Orthodox Church, and there are 280 individuals (or about 0.79% of the population) who belong to another Christian church. There are 8 individuals (or about 0.02% of the population) who are Jewish, and 2,160 (or about 6.11% of the population) who are Islamic. There are 231 individuals (or about 0.65% of the population) who belong to another church (not listed on the census), 1,393 (or about 3.94% of the population) belong to no church, are agnostic or atheist, and 1,066 individuals (or about 3.02% of the population) did not answer the question.

== Municipalities ==
Coat of arms	Municipality	Population (31 December 2020)	Area in km^{2}	SFOS number
Bad Ragaz	Bad Ragaz	6,467	25.37	3291
Flums	Flums	4,964	75.03	3292
Mels	Mels	8,716	139.16	3293
Pfäfers	Pfäfers	1,528	128.53	3294
Quarten	Quarten	2,988	61.90	3295
Sargans	Sargans	6,213	9.48	3296
Vilters-Wang	Vilters-Wangs	4,886	32.70	3297
Walenstadt	Walenstadt	5,728	45.75	3298
	Total (8)	41,490	517.92	1722
