= Wartenstein Castle (St Gallen) =

Castle in Switzerland

Wartenstein
- Pfäfers
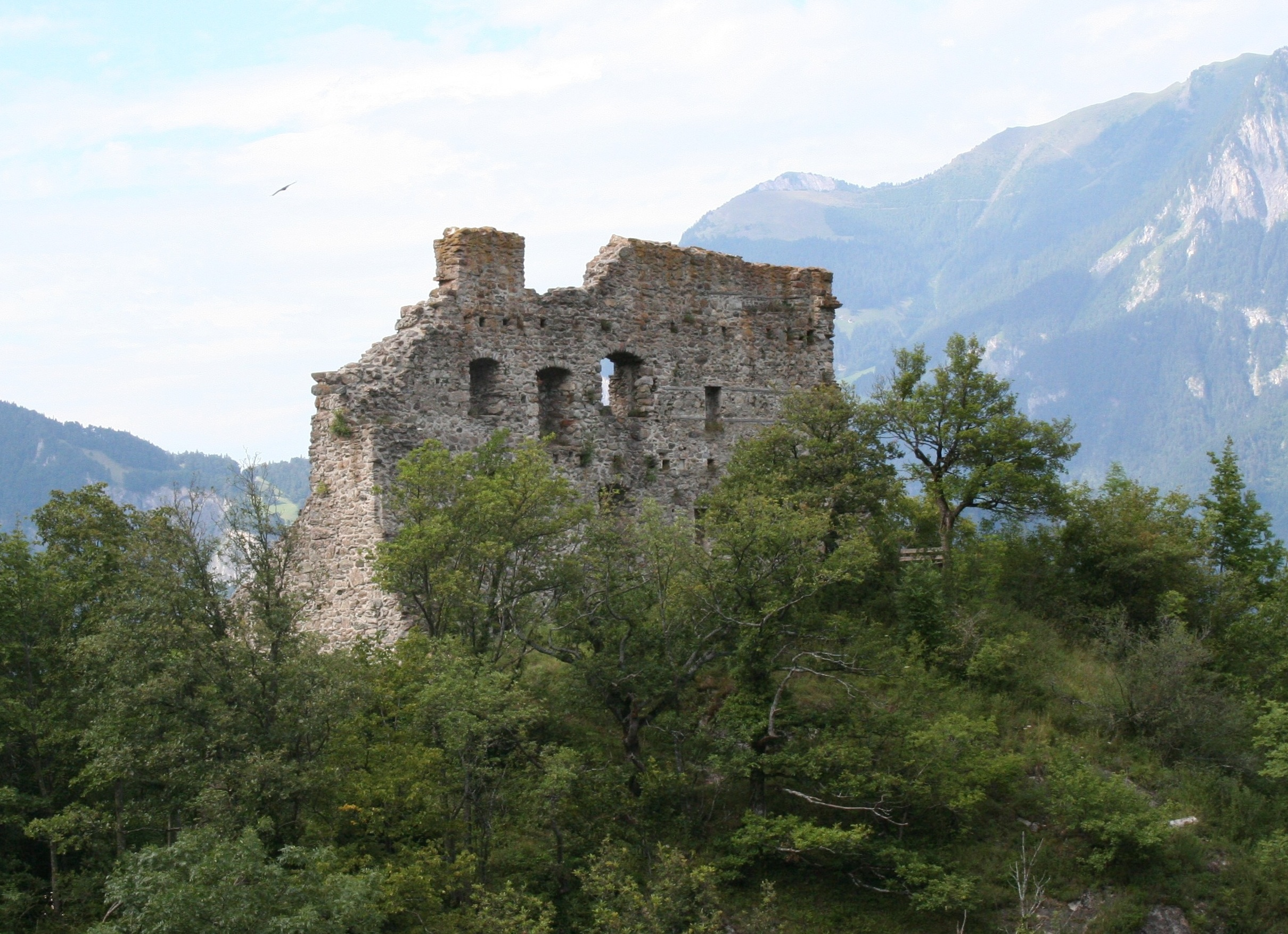
- Ruins of Wartenstein

Site information
- Type: hill castle
- Code: CH-SG
- Condition: ruin

Location
- Coordinates: 46°59′39.30″N 9°30′37.94″E
- Height: 730 m

Site history
- Built: about 1206

Wartenstein Castle is a castle in the municipality of Pfäfers of the Canton of St. Gallen in Switzerland. It is a Swiss heritage site of national significance.

== See also ==
- List of castles in Switzerland
