= Wartensteinbahn =

Former funicular railway at Bad Ragaz, Switzerland

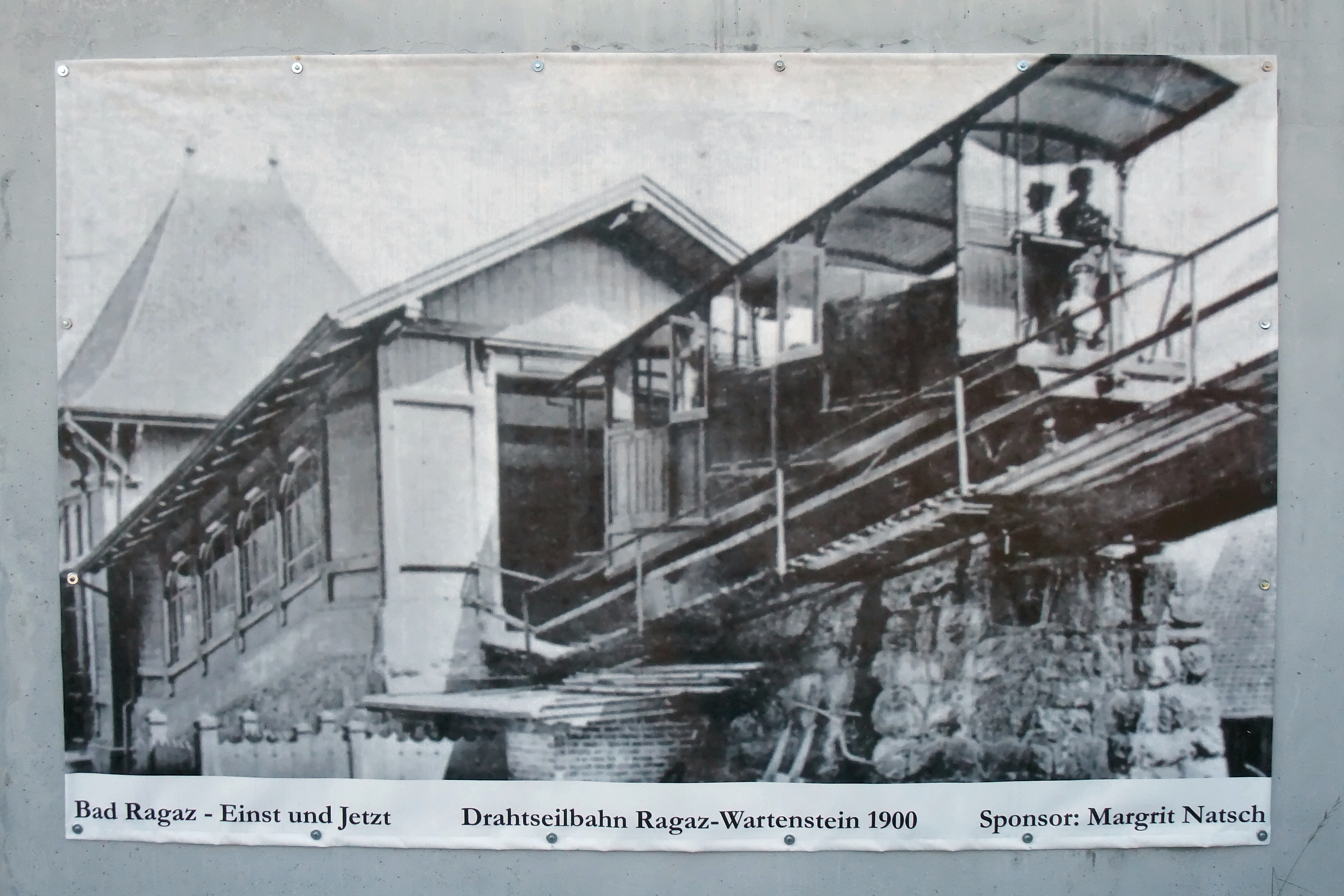

Overview
- Other name: Drahtseilbahn Ragaz–Wartenstein
- Status: ceased operation
- Owner: Actien-Gesellschaft Drahtseilbahn Ragaz-Wartenstein
- Locale: Canton of St. Gallen, Switzerland
- Termini: Bad Ragaz; Wartenstein
- Stations: 2

Service
- Rolling stock: 2 for 28 passengers each

History
- Opened: 1 August 1892
- Concession: 1890
- Closed: 25 October 1964

Technical
- Line length: 788 m (2,585 ft)
- Track length: 796 m (2,612 ft)
- Number of tracks: 1 with passing loop
- Rack system: Riggenbach
- Track gauge: 1,000 mm (3 ft 3 3/8 in)
- Electrification: No
- Highest elevation: 747 m (2,451 ft)
- Maximum incline: 30.3%

Wartensteinbahn was a funicular railway in the canton of St. Gallen, Switzerland. The line led from Bad Ragaz at 520 m to Wartenstein (part of Pfäfers) at 747 m. It was built in 1892 for tourists in the resort Ragaz to access the viewpoint and restaurant at Wartenstein. The line with a length of 790 m had a difference of elevation of 206 m at a maximum incline of 30%. The single-track line with a passing loop used water counterbalancing.

The funicular was owned and operated by Actien-Gesellschaft Drahtseilbahn Ragaz-Wartenstein.

The line was closed in 1964.

From 2018 to 2022, the association Förderverein Wartensteinbahn attempted to rebuild the funicular. A project with an estimated cost of 9.5 million CHF was developed. The pandemic and a change of ownership of the hotel at the upper station led to the cancellation of the project.

Remains of tunnels, viaducts, the passing loop are still visible. The lower station was converted into a residential building.

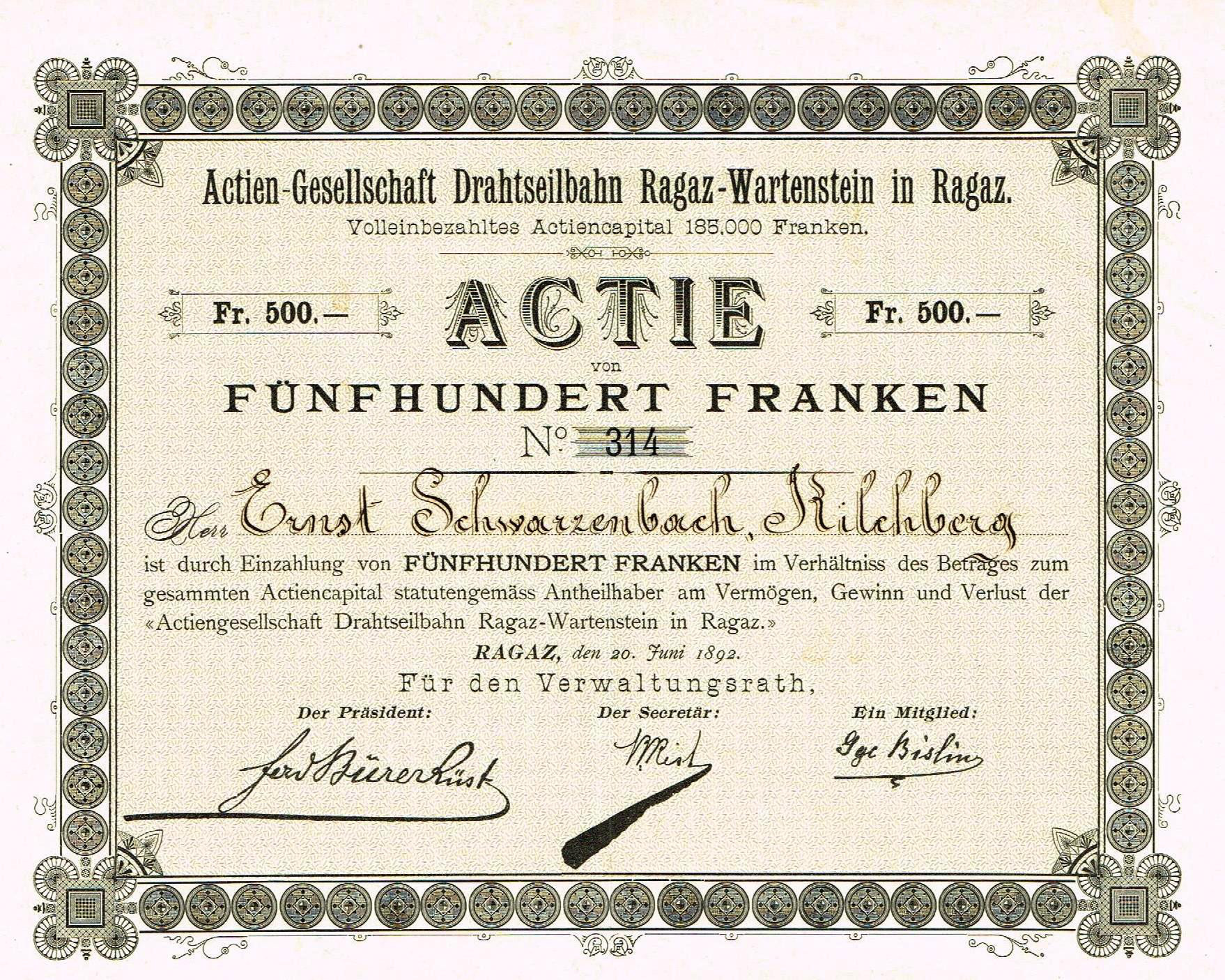
share certificate issued 1892 of Actien-Gesellschaft Drahtseilbahn Ragaz-Wartenstein

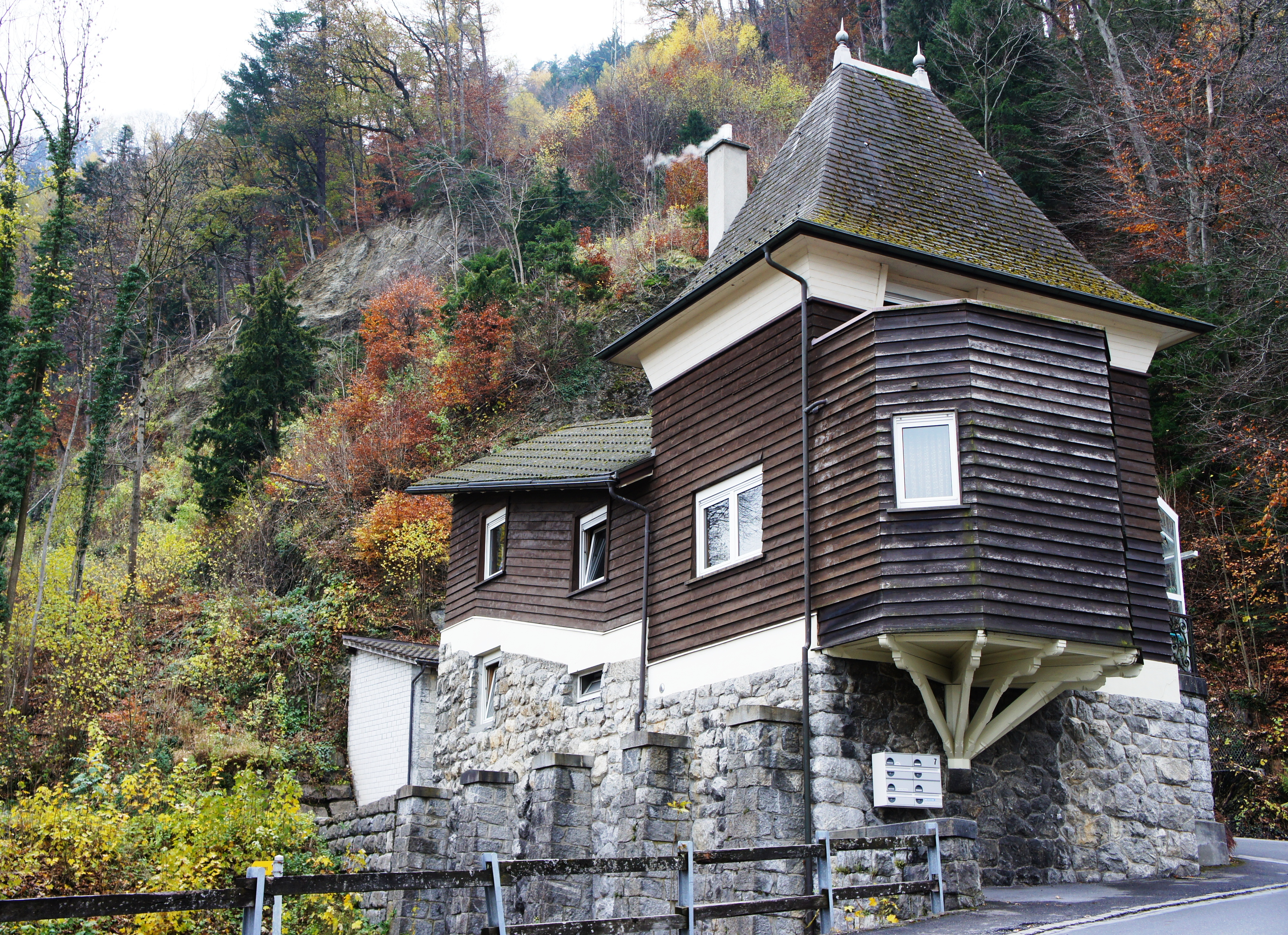
lower station (2016)

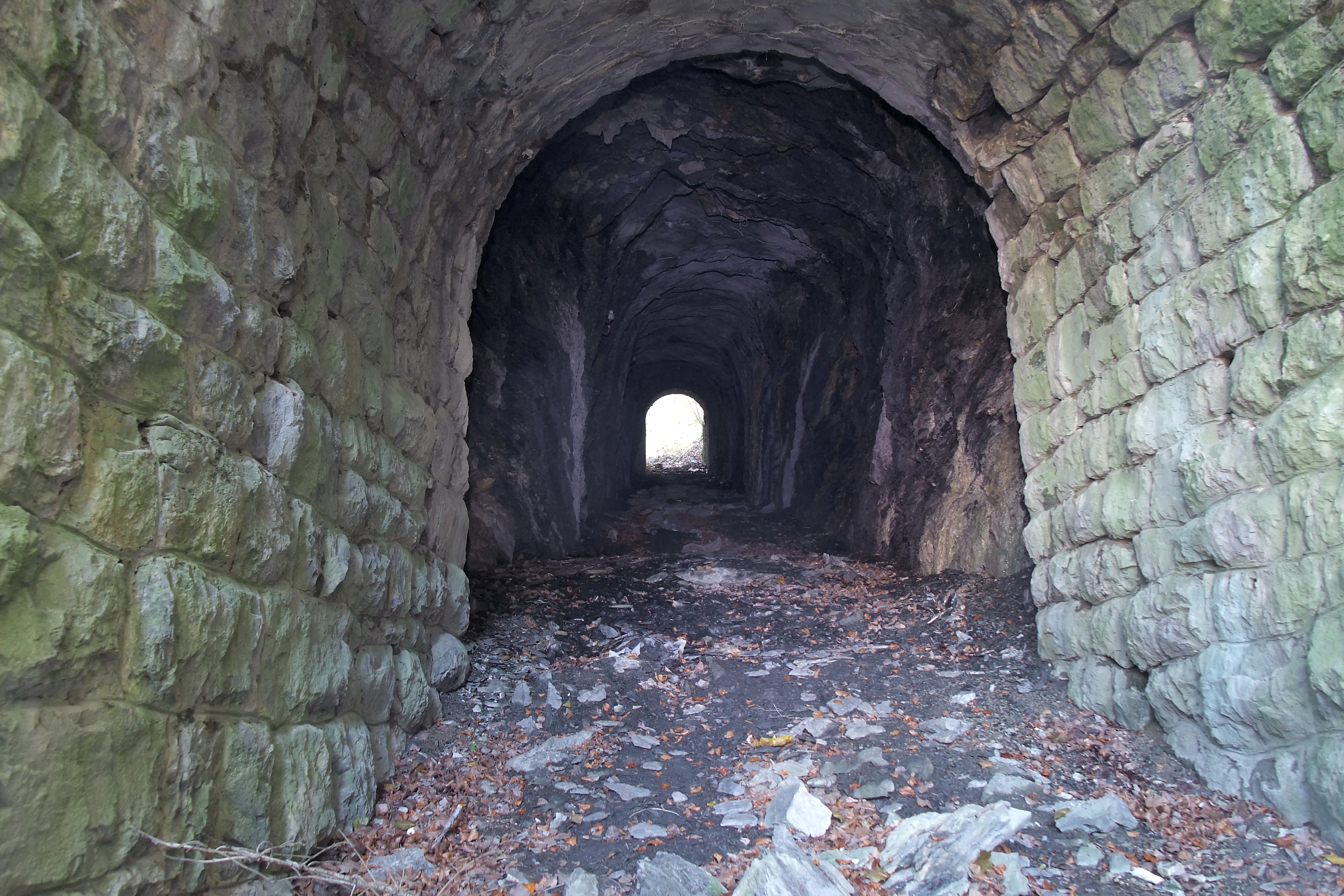
St. Niklausen Tunnel (2016)

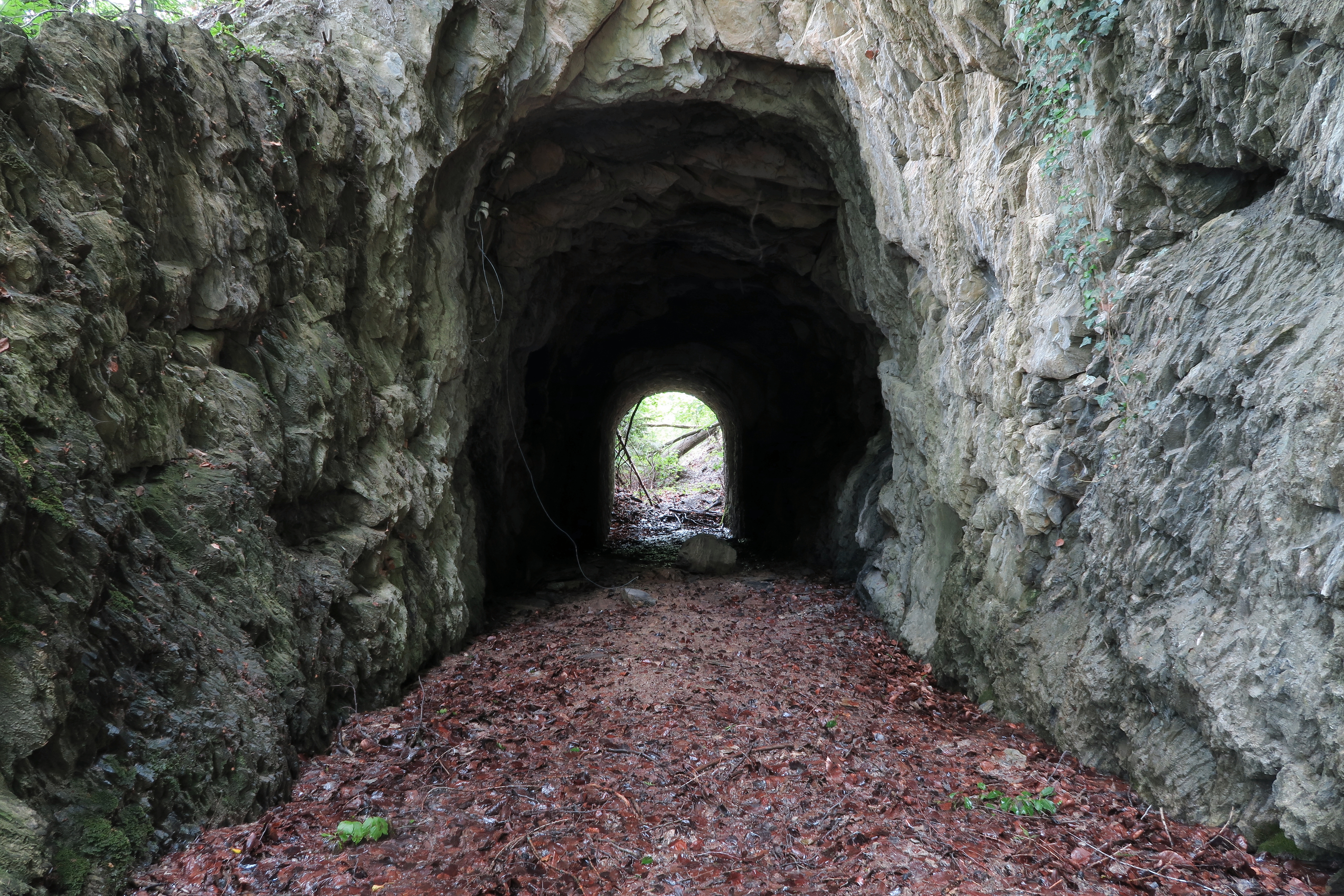
Wartenstein Tunnel (2016)

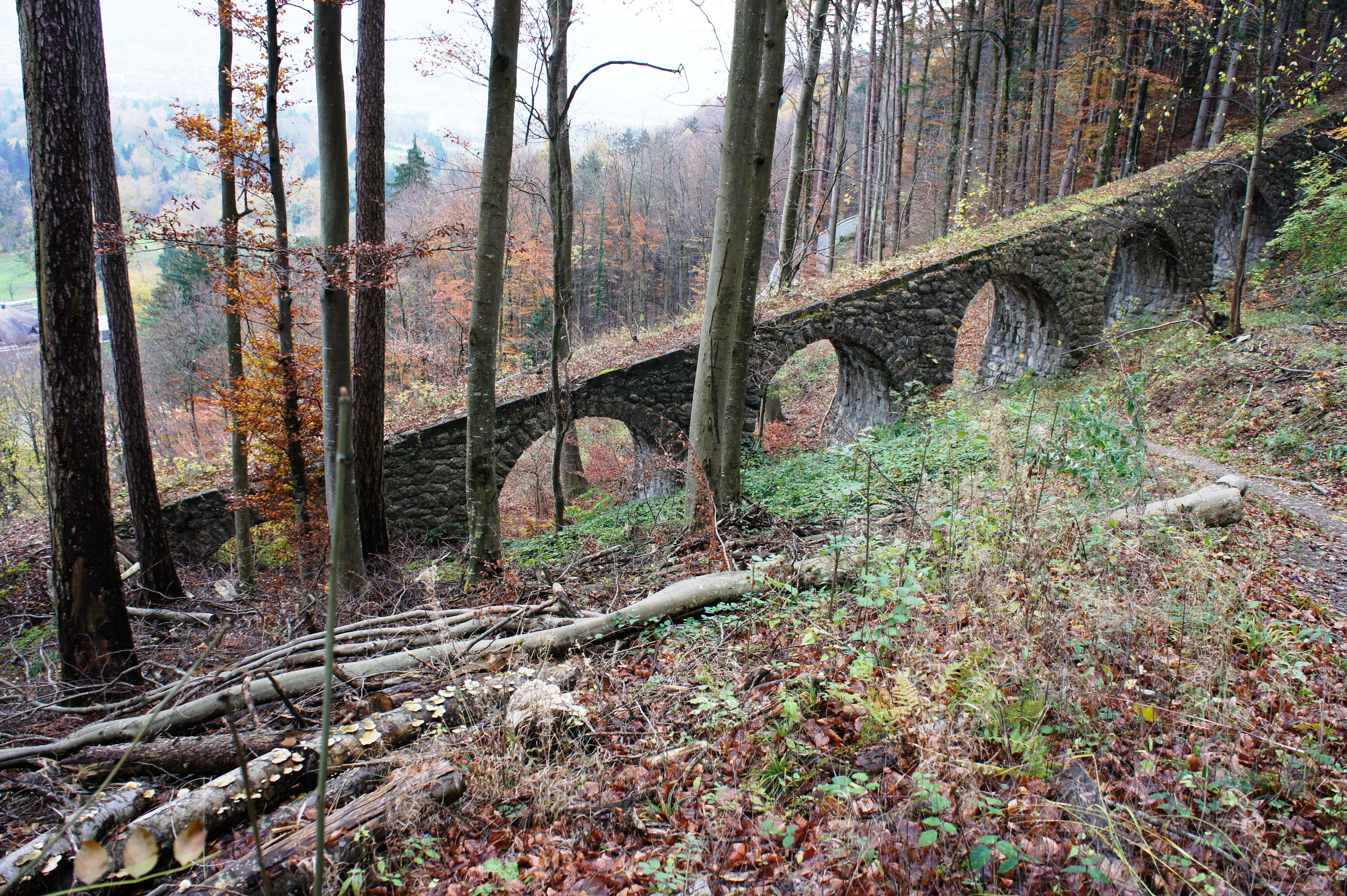
viaduct (2013)
