= Bad Ragaz =

- Municipality
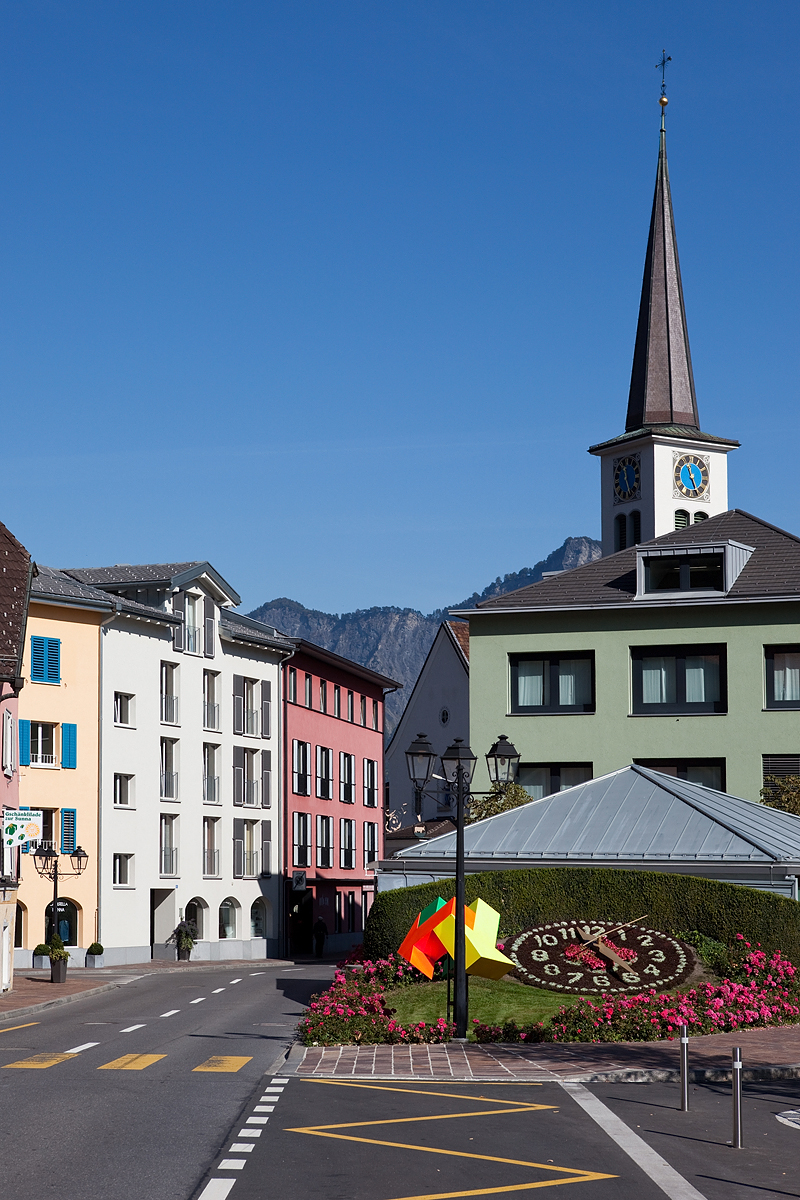
- Bad Ragaz – main square

- Flag Coat of arms
- Location of Bad Ragaz
- Location within Switzerland Location within Canton of St. Gallen
- Coordinates: 47°00′N 9°30′E
- Country: Switzerland
- Canton: St. Gallen
- District: Sarganserland

Government
  - Mayor: Guido Germann

Area
  - Total: 25.37 km^{2} (9.80 sq mi)
- Elevation: 516 m (1,693 ft)

Population (December 2020)
  - Total: 6,467
  - Density: 254.9/km^{2} (660.2/sq mi)
- Time zone: UTC+01:00 (CET)
  - Summer (DST): UTC+02:00 (CEST)
- Postal code: 7310
- SFOS number: 3291
- ISO 3166 code: CH-SG
- Surrounded by: Fläsch (GR), Maienfeld (GR), Mastrils (GR), Mels, Pfäfers, Vilters-Wangs
- Website: badragaz.ch

Bad Ragaz is a municipality in the Wahlkreis (constituency) of Sarganserland in the canton of St. Gallen in Switzerland.

It is the home of a famous natural spring and is a popular spa and health resort destination.

== History ==
Bad Ragaz is first mentioned circa 843 as Ragaces.

As plain Ragaz, the locality was originally a farming village. It had over the centuries a certain importance owing to its position on the south–north route between Italy and Germany. Its history was closely linked to that of the Benedictine Pfäfers Abbey, an important monastery dating back perhaps to the eighth century, which was the dominant landholder around the village and the principal rights holder. The residence of the Prince Abbot of Pfäfers, a building known as the Hof Ragaz served as the premises of the local governor or Statthalter, a position exercised by the Abbey.

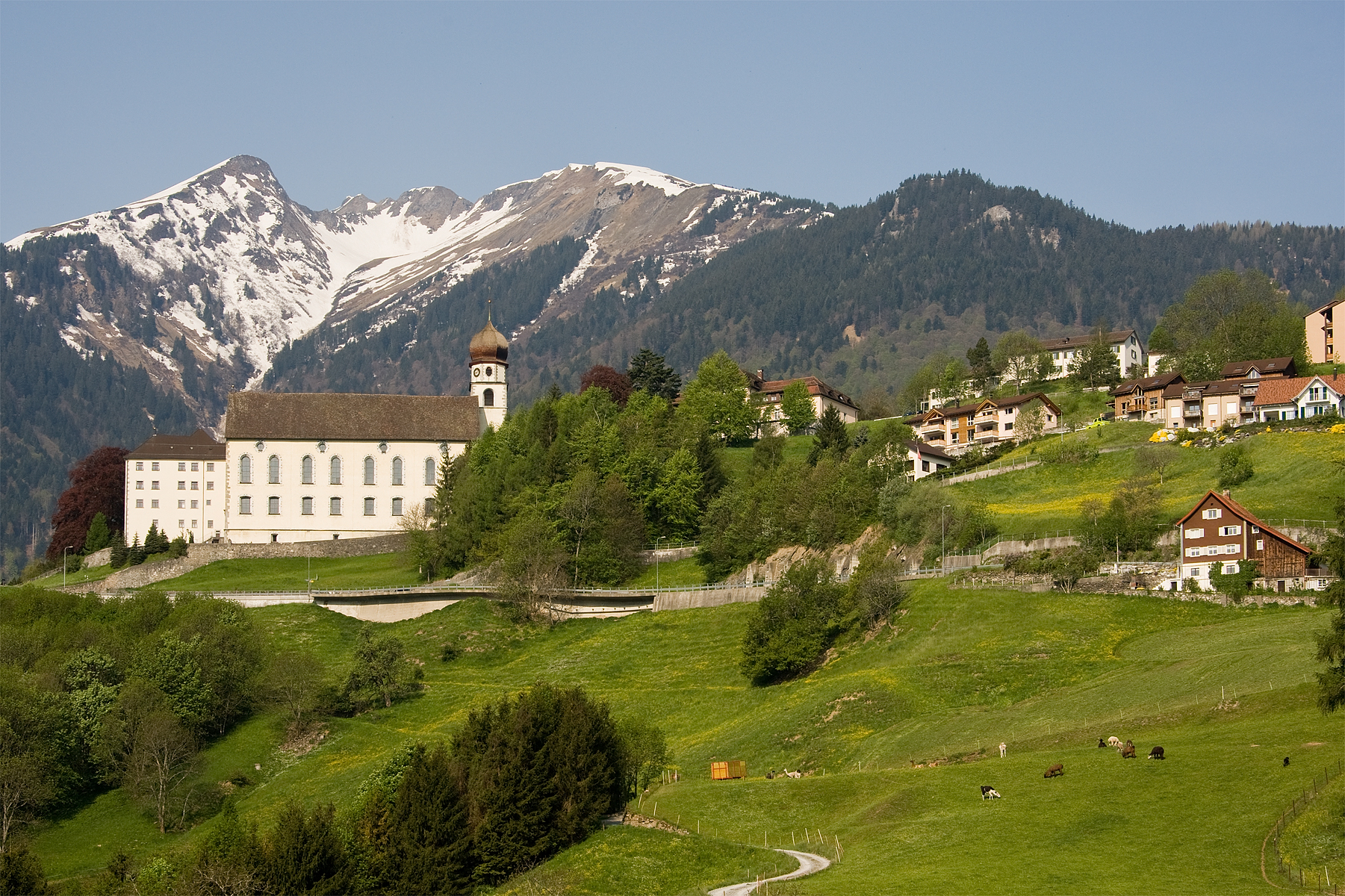
Pfäfers Abbey and Bad Ragaz

One of the most notable events in the local chronicles is the Battle of Ragaz, an episode in the Old Zürich War of the years 1440–1446 fought between the canton of Zürich and the other seven cantons of the Old Swiss Confederacy over which of them should inherit the interests and lands of Count Friedrich VII of Toggenburg, who had died in 1438 intestate and heirless. The armed clash took place at Ragaz on 6 March 1446.

The village suffered over time from the outbreak of several fires and also from flooding which struck, for example, in 1750, 1762 and 1868. However, in the nineteenth century there was an upturn in local fortunes. Financial struggles had prompted the last Abbot of Pfäfers, Plazidus Pfister, to request that Pope Gregory XVI secularize the abbey, a request that was granted on 20 March 1838. On 20 November 1838. The Canton of St. Gallen then took over the Abbey's estates, including the local hot springs, which began to be increasingly exploited for tourism thanks to a project connecting the springs with the village. This was to lead eventually, in 1937, to a change of name to Bad Bagaz, and increasing orientation of the local economy towards catering for health spa clientel.

It was in Ragaz that around the year 1880 the Swiss novelist and author of children's stories, Johanna Spyri (1827-1901), penned the story of Heidi, a 5-year-old girl living with her grandfather in the Swiss Alps. Written, as the title page announced, to be a book "for children and those who love children", it become known throughout the world. Modern-day Ragaz is also proud of the fact that it was the retreat where the Bohemian-Austrian poet and author Rainer Maria Rilke (1875-1926) towards the end of his life reputedly wrote part of his poetic work the Duineser Elegien (Duino Elegies), in particular the seventh Elegy with its famous lines Hiersein ist herrlich... (To be here is splendid ...).

== Geography ==
Bad Ragaz has an area, as of 2006, of 25.4 km^{2} (9.8 sq mi). Of this area, 45.4% is used for agricultural purposes, while 34.9% is forested. Of the rest of the land, 9.6% is settled (buildings or roads) and the remainder (10.1%) is non-productive (rivers or lakes).

The municipality is in the Sarganserland Wahlkreis of Bezirk Sargans. The spa and recreation village is in the south-east of the canton at the end of the Tamina valley. It lies on the north–south and east–west routes over the Graubünden Alps. Until 1937 Bad Ragaz was known as Ragaz.

Aerial view from 300 m by Walter Mittelholzer (1922)

== Coat of arms ==
The blazon of the municipal coat of arms is Azure a Dove volant displayed Argent beaked and membered Or having a sprig Gules in the beak.

== Demographics ==
Bad Ragaz has a population (as of 31 December 2020) of 6,467. As of 2007, about 25.1% of the population was made up of foreign nationals. Of the foreign population, (as of 2000), 122 are from Germany, 144 are from Italy, 508 are from ex-Yugoslavia, 59 are from Austria, 1 person is from Turkey, and 312 are from another country. Over the last 10 years the population has grown by 8.3%. Most of the population (as of 2000) speaks German (84.9%), with Serbo-Croatian being second most common (4.3%) and Italian being third (2.9%). Of the Swiss national languages (as of 2000), 4,184 speak German, 30 people speak French, 141 people speak Italian, and 45 people speak Romansh.

The age distribution, as of 2000, in Bad Ragaz is:

Age	0–9	10–19	20–29	30–39	40–49	50–59	60–69	70–79	80–89	90–99
Numbers	503	626	591	810	756	640	476	318	174	35
	10.2%	12.7%	12.0%	16.4%	15.3%	13.0%	9.7%	6.5%	3.5%	0.7%

In 2000 there were 765 persons (or 15.5% of the population) who were living alone in a private dwelling. There were 1,181 (or 24.0%) persons who were part of a couple (married or otherwise committed) without children, and 2,390 (or 48.5%) who were part of a couple with children. There were 290 (or 5.9%) people who lived in single parent home, while there are 36 persons who were adult children living with one or both parents, 24 persons who lived in a household made up of relatives, 35 who lived household made up of unrelated persons, and 208 who are either institutionalized or live in another type of collective housing.

In the 2007 federal election the most popular party was the SVP which received 40.3% of the vote. The next three most popular parties were the CVP (21.4%), the FDP (13.7%) and the SP (12.7%).

The entire Swiss population is generally well educated. In Bad Ragaz about 68.9% of the population (between age 25–64) have completed either non-mandatory upper secondary education or additional higher education (either university or a Fachhochschule). Out of the total population in Bad Ragaz, as of 2000, the highest education level completed by 1,070 people (21.7% of the population) was Primary, while 1,975 (40.1%) have completed Secondary, 558 (11.3%) have attended a Tertiary school, and 175 (3.6%) are not in school. The remainder did not answer this question.

The historical population is given in the following table:

Year	Population
1800	954
1850	1,366
1880	1,993
1900	1,866
1950	2,584
1970	3,713
1990	4,325

== Personalities ==
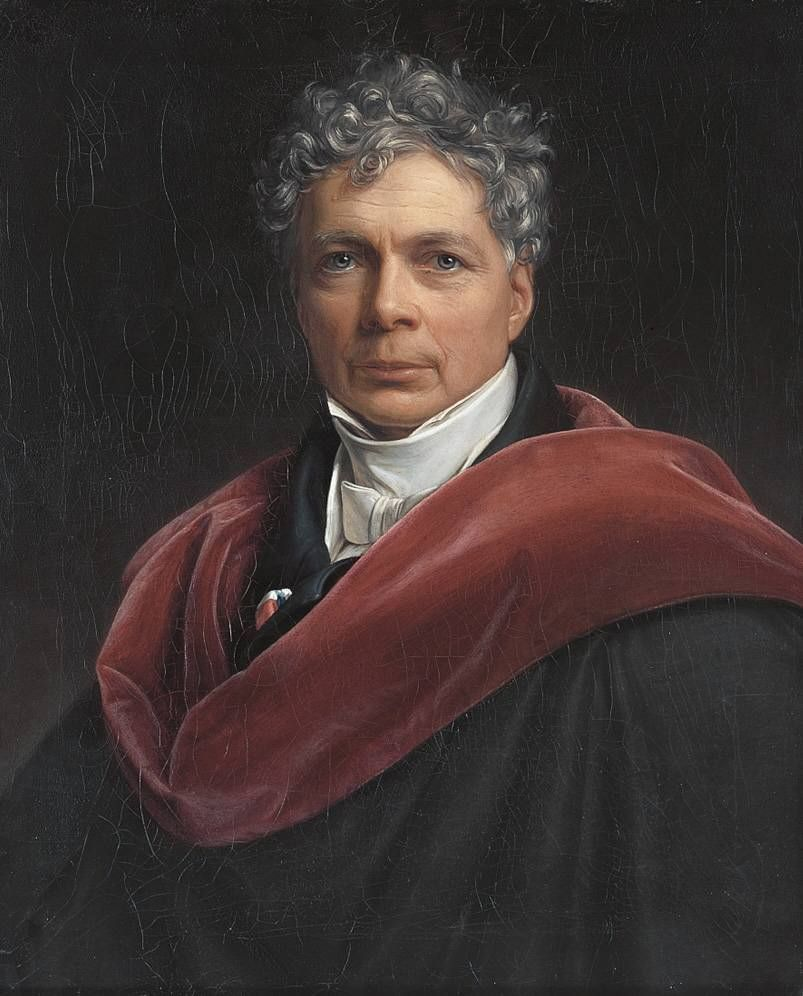
Friedrich Wilhelm Schelling 1835

- Friedrich Wilhelm Schelling (1775–1854), German philosopher, died in Bad Ragaz
- Chlodwig, Prince of Hohenlohe-Schillingsfürst died in Bad Ragaz in 1901
- Carl Garré (1857 in Ragaz – 1928) a surgeon who proved that Staphylococcus aureus causes carbuncles and boils by experimenting on himself
- O.G. Khouw (1874–1927), a colonial Dutch-Indonesian philanthropist and landlord who died in Bad Ragaz
- Hans Werner Widrig (b. 1941), a Member of the National Council from 1987-1991 and 1995-2003

Bad Ragaz is also closely associated with the fictional character Heidi.

== Heritage sites of national significance ==
The Village Baths (German: Dorfbad) with the water cure rooms (German: Trinkhalle) at Bartholoméplatz 1, the chapel of St. Leonhard and the ruins of Freudenberg Castle are listed as Swiss heritage sites of national significance.

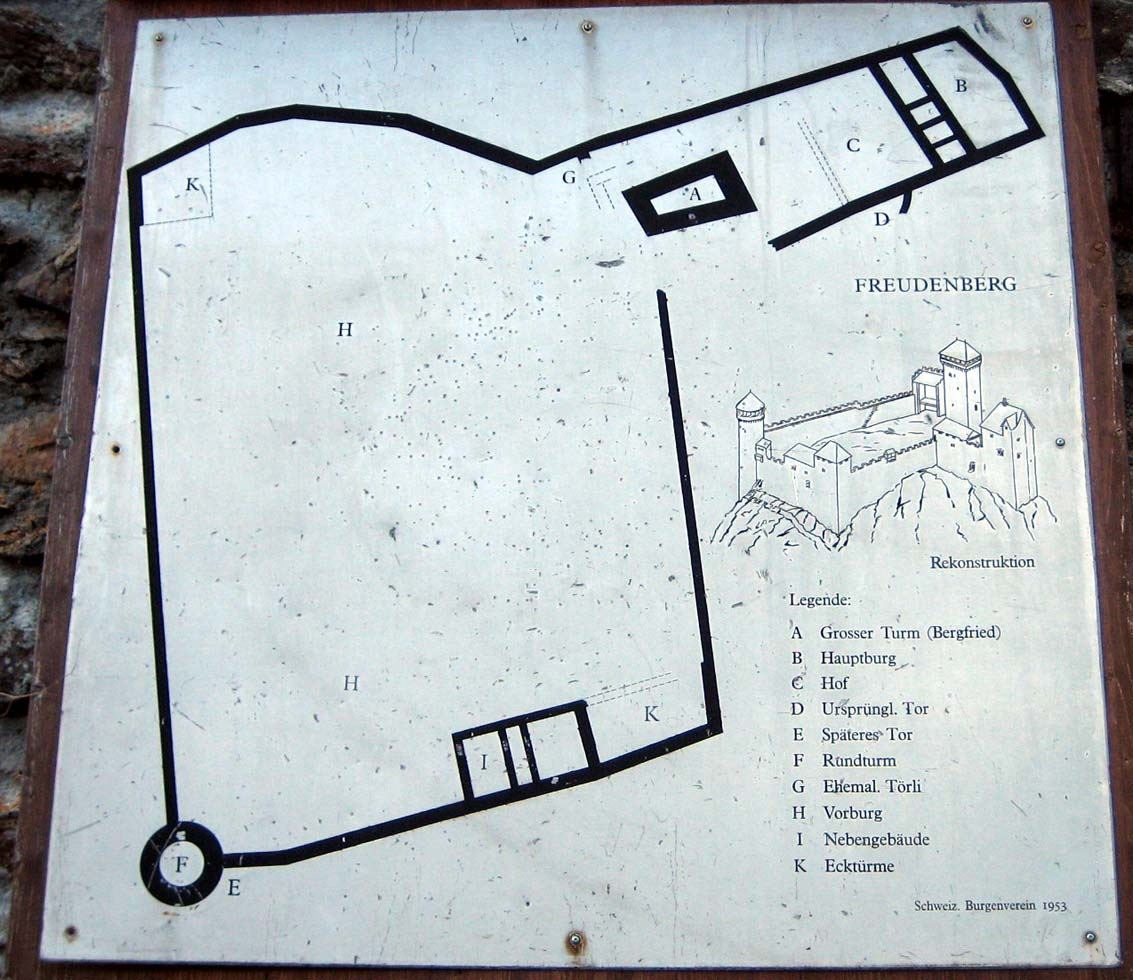
Floorplan of Castle Freudenberg

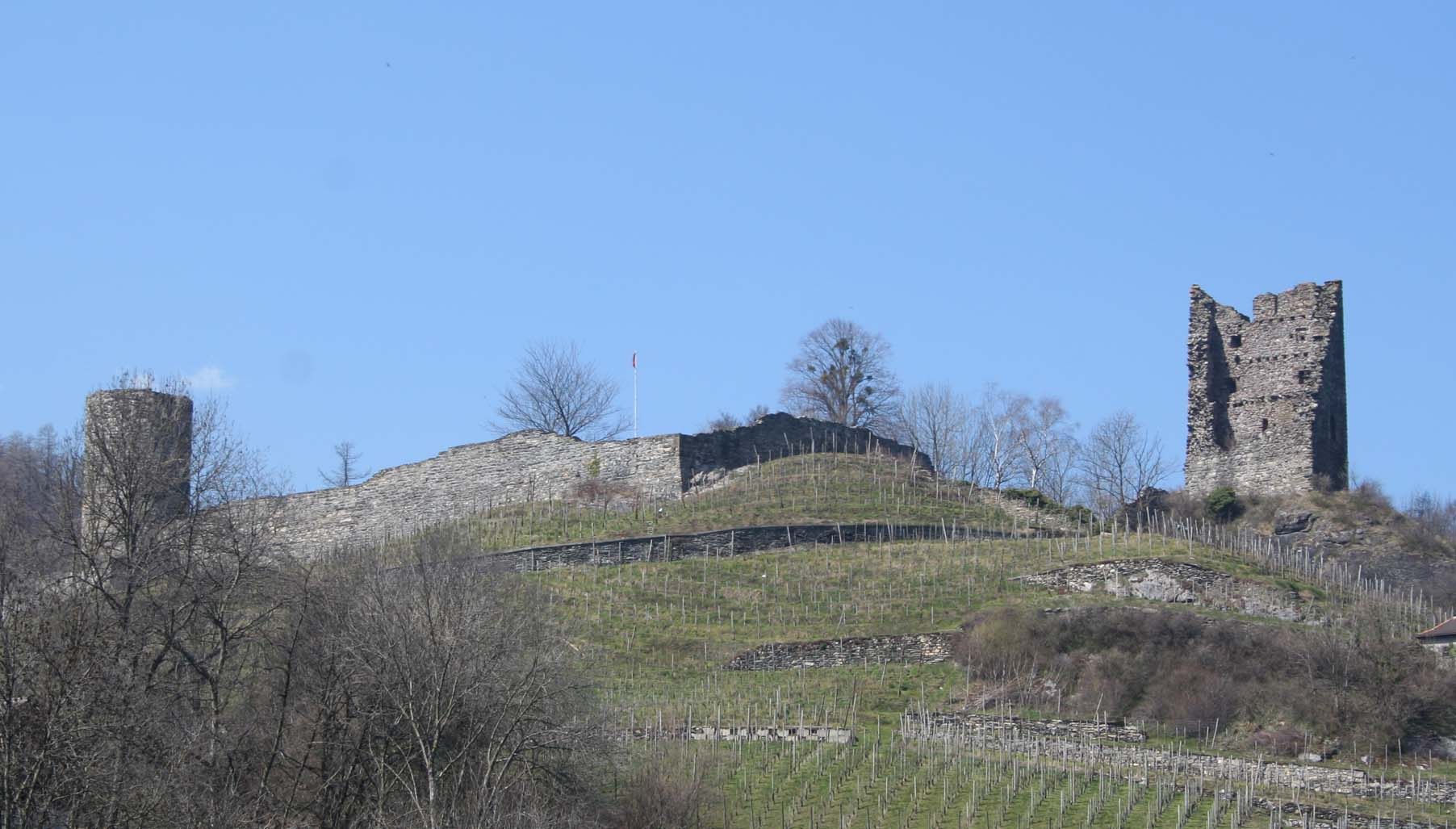
View of the castle site

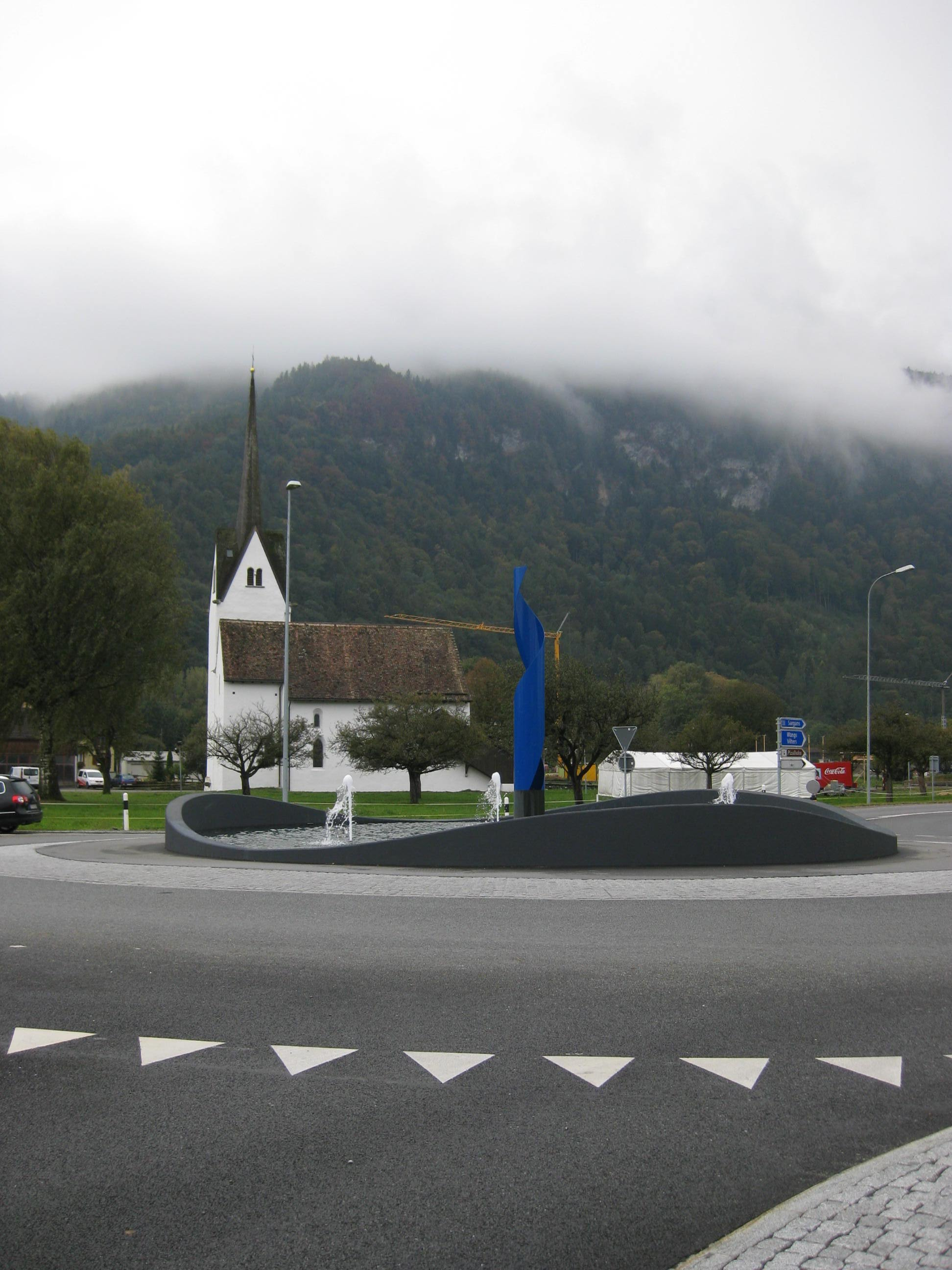
Chapel of St. Leonhard

== Economy ==
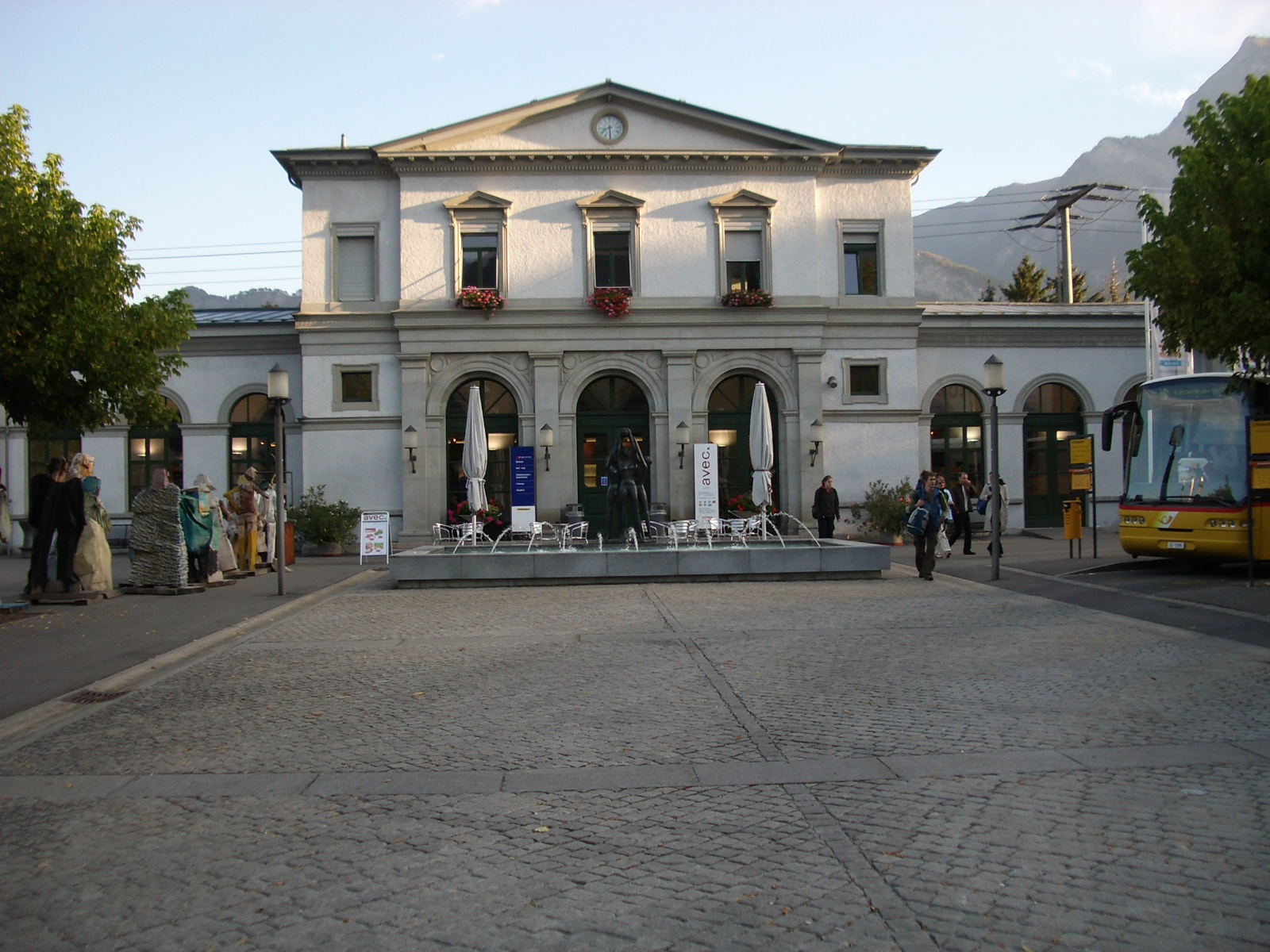
Railway station

As of 2007, Bad Ragaz had an unemployment rate of 1.62%. As of 2005, there were 103 people employed in the primary economic sector and about 23 businesses involved in this sector. 687 people are employed in the secondary sector and there are 71 businesses in this sector. 1,911 people are employed in the tertiary sector, with 244 businesses in this sector.

As of October 2009 the average unemployment rate was 3.0%. There were 331 businesses in the municipality of which 64 were involved in the secondary sector of the economy while 248 were involved in the third.

As of 2000 there were 1,510 residents who worked in the municipality, while 1,217 residents worked outside Bad Ragaz and 1,189 people commuted into the municipality for work.

The headquarters of the gas analysis, detection, and control instrument manufacturing company INFICON is located in Bad Ragaz.

== Religion ==
From the 2000 census, 2,862 or 58.1% were Roman Catholic, while 1,105 or 22.4% belonged to the Swiss Reformed Church. There was 1 individual of the Christian Catholic faith; 249 individuals who belonged to the Orthodox Church; and 64 individuals who belonged to another Christian church. There were 2 Jews and 166 Muslims. Forty-two people belonged to another church (not listed in the census); 277 belonged to no church, were agnostic or atheist; and 161 did not answer the question.

== Transport ==
Bad Ragaz sits on the Chur–Rorschach railway between Sargans and Chur and is served by local and regional trains at Bad Ragaz railway station.

Bad Ragaz Airport is a small airport serving private flights and recreational gliding.

Wartensteinbahn was funicular between Bad Ragaz and Wartenstein, 206 m above (1892-1964).

== Climate ==
Between 1961 and 1990 Bad Ragaz had an average of 120.5 days of rain or snow per year and on average received 830 mm (33 in) of precipitation. The wettest month was August during which time Bad Ragaz receives an average of 109 mm (4.3 in) of rain or snow. During this month there was precipitation for an average of 12.7 days. The driest month of the year was October with an average of 49 mm (1.9 in) of precipitation over 12.7 days.

Climate data for Bad Ragaz, elevation 496 m (1,627 ft), (1991–2020 normals, extremes 1940–present)
Month	Jan	Feb	Mar	Apr	May	Jun	Jul	Aug	Sep	Oct	Nov	Dec	Year
Record high °C (°F)	18.5 (65.3)	23.8 (74.8)	24.0 (75.2)	28.1 (82.6)	33.7 (92.7)	35.8 (96.4)	36.2 (97.2)	36.8 (98.2)	33.1 (91.6)	27.6 (81.7)	24.0 (75.2)	21.2 (70.2)	36.8 (98.2)
Mean daily maximum °C (°F)	4.5 (40.1)	6.2 (43.2)	11.3 (52.3)	15.7 (60.3)	19.8 (67.6)	22.9 (73.2)	24.6 (76.3)	24.1 (75.4)	19.7 (67.5)	15.5 (59.9)	9.5 (49.1)	5.2 (41.4)	14.9 (58.8)
Daily mean °C (°F)	1.1 (34.0)	2.3 (36.1)	6.5 (43.7)	10.4 (50.7)	14.4 (57.9)	17.6 (63.7)	19.1 (66.4)	18.8 (65.8)	14.9 (58.8)	10.9 (51.6)	5.8 (42.4)	2.0 (35.6)	10.3 (50.5)
Mean daily minimum °C (°F)	−2.1 (28.2)	−1.3 (29.7)	2.2 (36.0)	5.6 (42.1)	9.7 (49.5)	13.0 (55.4)	14.7 (58.5)	14.6 (58.3)	10.9 (51.6)	7.2 (45.0)	2.5 (36.5)	−1.1 (30.0)	6.3 (43.3)
Record low °C (°F)	−21.2 (−6.2)	−26.5 (−15.7)	−15.6 (3.9)	−5.7 (21.7)	−2.4 (27.7)	0.9 (33.6)	5.1 (41.2)	2.7 (36.9)	0.1 (32.2)	−5.0 (23.0)	−14.8 (5.4)	−22.0 (−7.6)	−26.5 (−15.7)
Average precipitation mm (inches)	70.6 (2.78)	56.3 (2.22)	77.7 (3.06)	72.3 (2.85)	99.4 (3.91)	119.0 (4.69)	124.8 (4.91)	145.6 (5.73)	94.5 (3.72)	80.1 (3.15)	79.3 (3.12)	79.3 (3.12)	1,098.9 (43.26)
Average snowfall cm (inches)	33.2 (13.1)	32.9 (13.0)	18.5 (7.3)	1.8 (0.7)	0.7 (0.3)	0.0 (0.0)	0.0 (0.0)	0.0 (0.0)	0.0 (0.0)	0.1 (0.0)	12.0 (4.7)	24.6 (9.7)	123.8 (48.7)
Average precipitation days (≥ 1.0 mm)	9.1	7.7	10.1	9.2	11.7	12.7	12.9	13.4	9.8	8.7	9.4	10.0	124.7
Average snowy days (≥ 1.0 cm)	4.9	4.7	3.5	0.6	0.1	0.0	0.0	0.0	0.0	0.0	2.2	4.2	20.2
Average relative humidity (%)	76	73	70	66	69	71	72	74	75	76	77	78	73
Source 1: NOAA
Source 2: MeteoSwiss (snow 1981–2010) Infoclimat (extremes)
