= Vilters-Wangs =

- Municipality
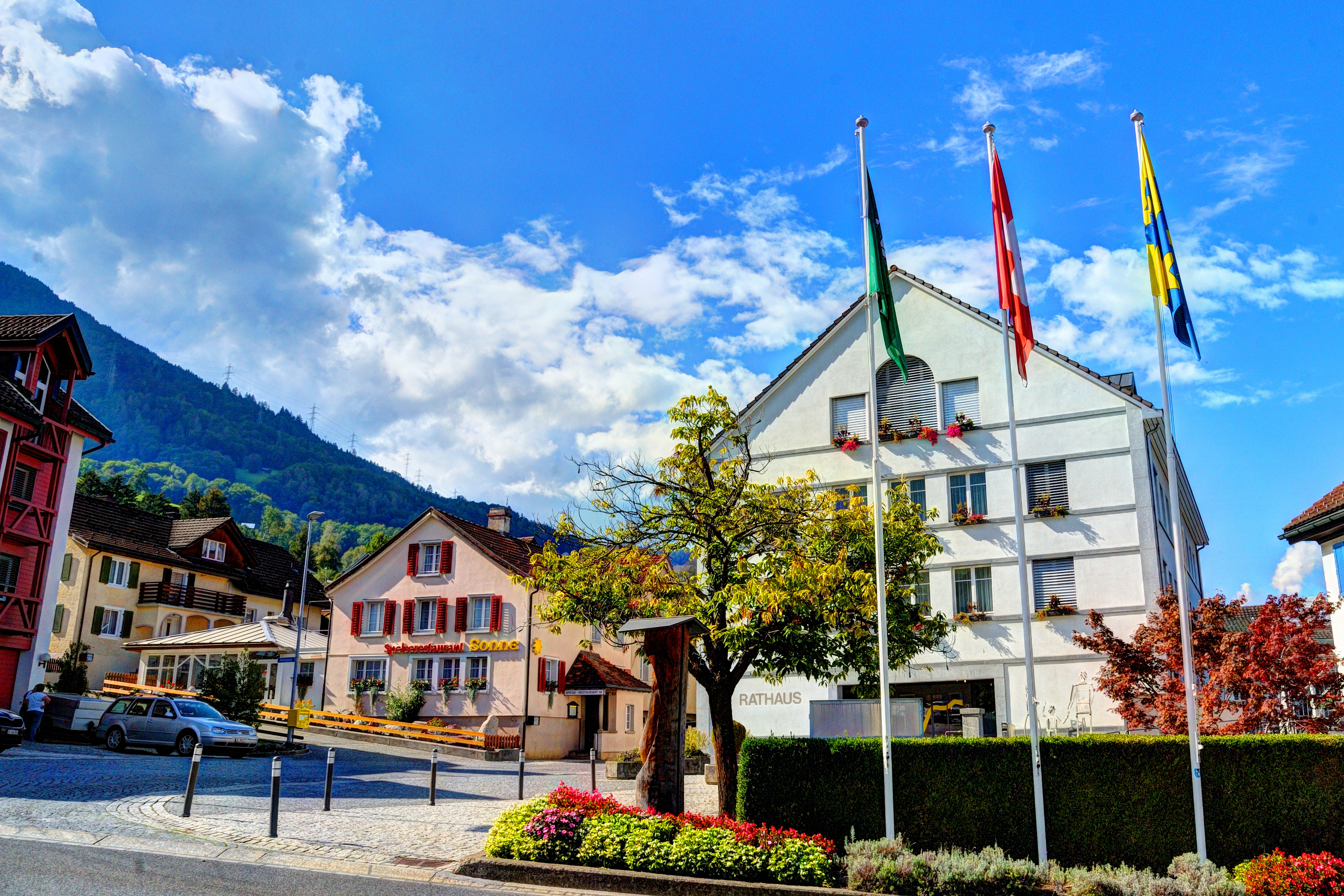

- Coat of arms
- Location of Vilters-Wangs
- Location within Switzerland Location within Canton of St. Gallen
- Coordinates: 47°1′N 9°27′E
- Country: Switzerland
- Canton: St. Gallen
- District: Sarganserland

Government
  - Mayor: Patrik Schlegel

Area
  - Total: 32.70 km^{2} (12.63 sq mi)
- Elevation: 510 m (1,670 ft)
- Highest elevation (Schwarze Hörner): 2,645 m (8,678 ft)
- Lowest elevation (Rhine River): 483 m (1,585 ft)

Population (December 2020)
  - Total: 4,886
  - Density: 149.4/km^{2} (387.0/sq mi)
- Demonym(s): Vilterser, Wangser
- Time zone: UTC+01:00 (CET)
  - Summer (DST): UTC+02:00 (CEST)
- Postal codes: 7324 Vilters; 7323 Wangs
- SFOS number: 3297
- ISO 3166 code: CH-SG
- Localities: Vilters, Wangs
- Surrounded by: Bad Ragaz, Fläsch (GR), Mels Sargans
- Website: vilters-wangs.ch

Vilters-Wangs is a municipality in the Wahlkreis (constituency) of Sarganserland in the canton of St. Gallen in Switzerland.

== History ==
Vilters-Wangs is first mentioned about 843 as Filtris.

== Geography ==
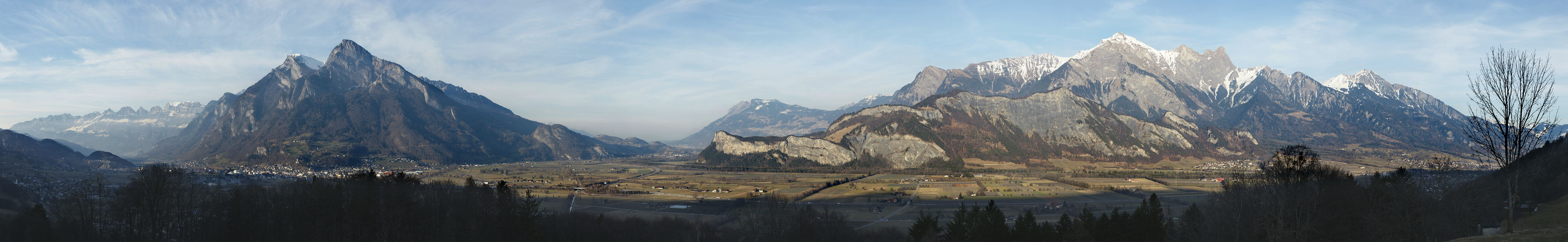
Panorama from Sonnenberg toward Vilters

Aerial view by Walter Mittelholzer (1920)

Vilters-Wangs has an area, as of 2006, of 32.7 km^{2} (12.6 sq mi). Of this area, 46.3% is used for agricultural purposes, while 34% is forested. Of the rest of the land, 5.1% is settled (buildings or roads) and the remainder (14.5%) is non-productive (rivers or lakes).

The municipality is in the Sarganserland Wahlkreis. It is located near a major expressway, near the mouth of the village stream into the Rhine river. It consists of the villages of Vilters and Wangs. Until 1996 Vilters-Wangs was known as Vilters.

== Coat of arms ==
The blazon of the municipal coat of arms is Per pale Or a Fleur-de-lis Azure and Azure a Mullet of Five Or

== Demographics ==
Vilters-Wangs has a population (as of 31 December 2020) of 4,886. As of 2007, about 10.5% of the population was made up of foreign nationals. Of the foreign population, (as of 2000), 30 are from Germany, 49 are from Italy, 163 are from ex-Yugoslavia, 38 are from Austria, 12 are from Turkey, and 70 are from another country. Over the last 10 years the population has grown at a rate of 7.3%. Most of the population (as of 2000) speaks German (94.0%), with Albanian being second most common ( 1.9%) and Italian being third ( 0.8%). Of the Swiss national languages (as of 2000), 3,658 speak German, 8 people speak French, 31 people speak Italian, and 22 people speak Romansh.

The age distribution, as of 2000, in Vilters-Wangs is; 528 children or 13.6% of the population are between 0 and 9 years old and 584 teenagers or 15.0% are between 10 and 19. Of the adult population, 458 people or 11.8% of the population are between 20 and 29 years old. 682 people or 17.5% are between 30 and 39, 570 people or 14.6% are between 40 and 49, and 498 people or 12.8% are between 50 and 59. The senior population distribution is 284 people or 7.3% of the population are between 60 and 69 years old, 184 people or 4.7% are between 70 and 79, there are 89 people or 2.3% who are between 80 and 89, and there are 14 people or 0.4% who are between 90 and 99.

In 2000 there were 361 persons (or 9.3% of the population) who were living alone in a private dwelling. There were 737 (or 18.9%) persons who were part of a couple (married or otherwise committed) without children, and 2,346 (or 60.3%) who were part of a couple with children. There were 219 (or 5.6%) people who lived in single parent home, while there are 37 persons who were adult children living with one or both parents, 19 persons who lived in a household made up of relatives, 19 who lived household made up of unrelated persons, and 153 who are either institutionalized or live in another type of collective housing.

In the 2007 federal election the most popular party was the SVP which received 45.2% of the vote. The next three most popular parties were the CVP (19.5%), the SP (14.1%) and the FDP (11.4%).

In Vilters-Wangs about 68.8% of the population (between age 25–64) have completed either non-mandatory upper secondary education or additional higher education (either university or a Fachhochschule). Out of the total population in Vilters-Wangs, as of 2000, the highest education level completed by 877 people (22.5% of the population) was Primary, while 1,431 (36.8%) have completed their secondary education, 360 (9.3%) have attended a Tertiary school, and 186 (4.8%) are not in school. The remainder did not answer this question.

The historical population is given in the following table:

year	population
1850	1,659
1900	1,720
1950	2,205
1990	3,688

== Economy ==
As of 2007, Vilters-Wangs had an unemployment rate of 0.9%. As of 2005, there were 129 people employed in the primary economic sector and about 53 businesses involved in this sector. 384 people are employed in the secondary sector and there are 46 businesses in this sector. 785 people are employed in the tertiary sector, with 104 businesses in this sector.

As of October 2009 the average unemployment rate was 2.0%. There were 202 businesses in the municipality of which 50 were involved in the secondary sector of the economy while 106 were involved in the third.

As of 2000 there were 678 residents who worked in the municipality, while 1,365 residents worked outside Vilters-Wangs and 577 people commuted into the municipality for work.

== Religion ==
From the 2000 census, 2,956 or 76.0% are Roman Catholic, while 477 or 12.3% belonged to the Swiss Reformed Church. Of the rest of the population, there are 8 individuals (or about 0.21% of the population) who belong to the Christian Catholic faith, there are 20 individuals (or about 0.51% of the population) who belong to the Orthodox Church, and there are 36 individuals (or about 0.93% of the population) who belong to another Christian church. There is 1 individual who is Jewish, and 133 (or about 3.42% of the population) who are Islamic. There are 24 individuals (or about 0.62% of the population) who belong to another church (not listed on the census), 124 (or about 3.19% of the population) belong to no church, are agnostic or atheist, and 112 individuals (or about 2.88% of the population) did not answer the question.
