= Tamina (river) =

River in Switzerland

Coordinates: 47°01′N 9°31′E

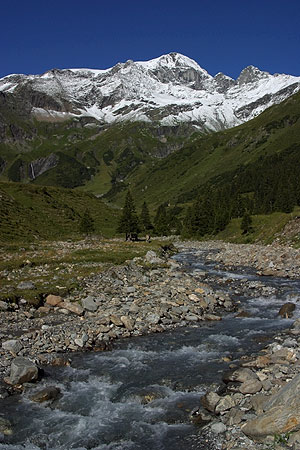
- The Tamina in the Calfeisental

Location
- Country: Switzerland
- Canton: St. Gallen
- District: Sarganserland

Physical characteristics
- Source
  - location: Egghorn
  - elevation: 2,630 m (8,630 ft)
- Mouth
  - location: Rhine
  - elevation: 496 m (1,627 ft)
- Length: ~ 29 km (18 mi)
- Basin size: 155.48 km^{2} (60.03 sq mi)

Basin features
- Progression: Rhine→ North Sea

The Tamina is a river in the south of the canton of St. Gallen in Switzerland, running close to the border to the canton of Grisons. It has a length of almost 29 km (18 mi), flowing through the Tamina Valley, of which Tamina Gorge (Taminaschlucht) is an impressive part, before it enters the Rhine as a left tributary.

== Course ==
The river starts below the Sardona Pass (2,758 m (9,049 ft)) and between the Surenstock (3,057 m (10,030 ft)) and the Trinserhorn (3,028 m (9,934 ft)) of the Glarus Alps. Within its first half, the river flows eastwards through the valley Calfeisen and the reservoir Lake Gigerwald (Gigerwaldsee) until it reaches Vättis at 943 m (3,094 ft), where it is joined by the Gorbsbach and where it turns sharply towards the northeast. Further below, the Tamina flows into the Mapraggsee. The lower section, heading northwards through Pfäfers, forms a deep and narrow gorge called the Taminaschlucht (English: Tamina Gorge). The river then flows through Bad Ragaz before it finally merges with the Alpine Rhine.

=== Tamina Gorge ===
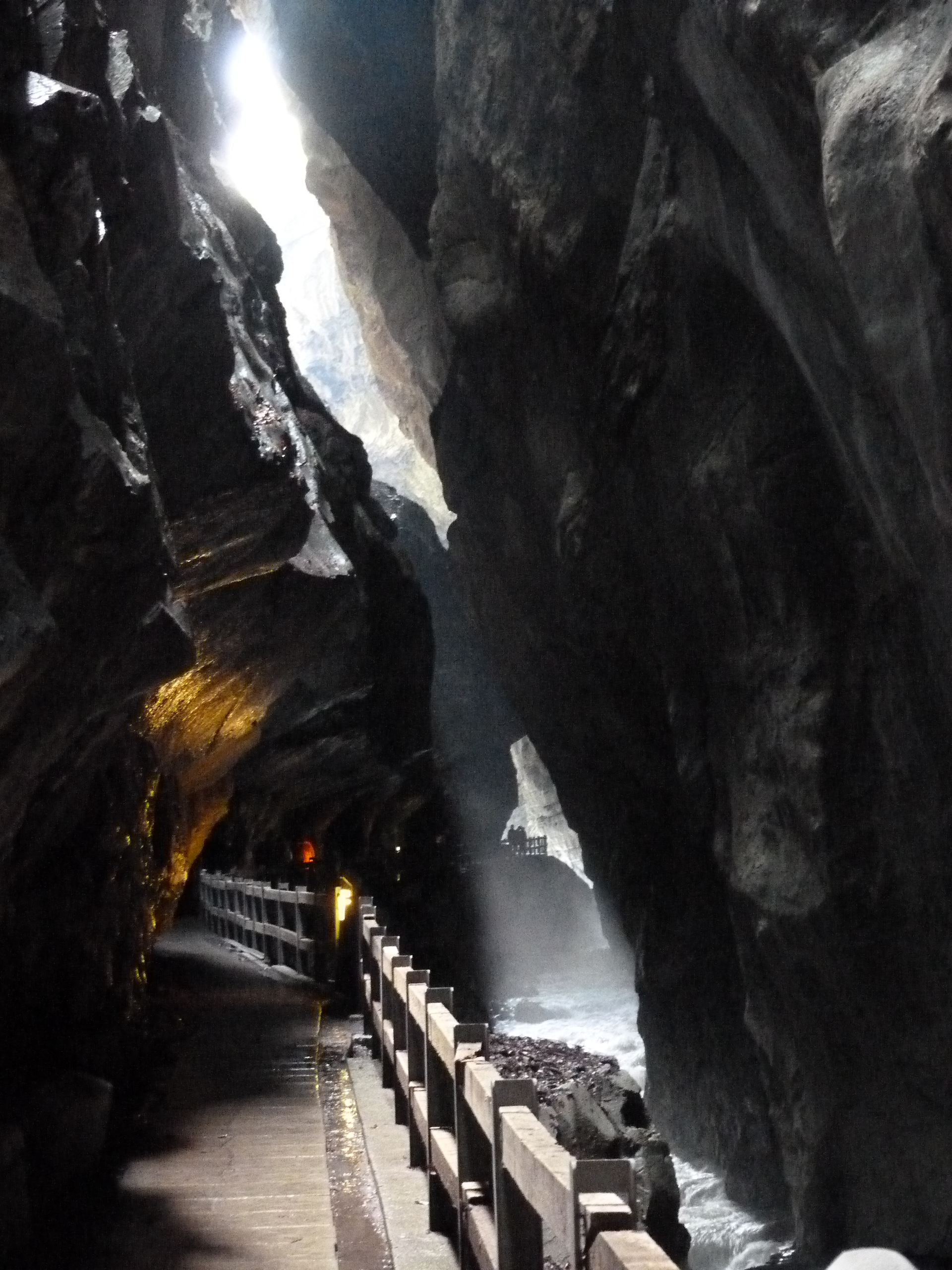
Tamina Gorge near the hot spring

Between Valens and the hamlet of Bonadivis, the water of the Tamina digs up to 200 m (660 ft) into the ground. Over the last 15,000 years, the small river has eaten its way into the rock and, between Valens and Ragol, it is sometimes even completely covered by natural bridges. The narrow crevice is around 750 m (2,460 ft) long and 70 m (230 ft) deep. The gorge, which is accessible by a pedestrian bridge, also contains a hot spring used for a spa. At Pfäfers, the gorge widens so much that for the last 4 km (2.5 mi) there is also space for a single-lane road next to the river, which since 1838 connects Bad Ragaz with Altes Bad Pfäfers (a former spa and hotel, now a museum and restaurant). The road is closed to cars, but a bus (line 453) operates on it, departing from Bad Ragaz railway station.

There are two hypotheses about the origin of the Tamina Gorge:

- First the river eroded a narrow channel through the 7 m (23 ft) thick Nummulite limestone, which forms the upper part of the gorge today. As the water pushed deeper over time, it eventually reached the softer Seewer Schist below. This allowed the river to widen its bed through lateral erosion of the surrounding rock. As the Tamina cut through the rock obliquely in an eastward movement, the western wall of the gorge tilted slightly and thus wedged the Nummulite limestone banks against each other, creating the natural bridges above the river.
- It is also conceivable that the Tamina eroded through the harder limestone and the gorge is actually a cave. However, the most important outcrops on the natural bridges are neither accessible nor visible.

In the upper part of the Tamina Gorge there is a hot spring, pumping out 8,000 L (1,800 imp gal; 2,100 US gal) of water per minute with a temperature of 36.6 °C (97.9 °F). Discovered in 1240, it was used on site and later in Altes Bad Pfäfers between the years 1350 and 1969, and since then it is used in the Valens medical clinic and the spa in Bad Ragaz.

== History ==
Historically, the Tamina Valley (Taminatal, also Vättnertal) was owned by the Pfäfers Abbey, joined to the canton of St. Gallen at its formation in 1803.

== See also ==
- List of rivers of Switzerland
- List of canyons
