= Pfäfers =

- Municipality
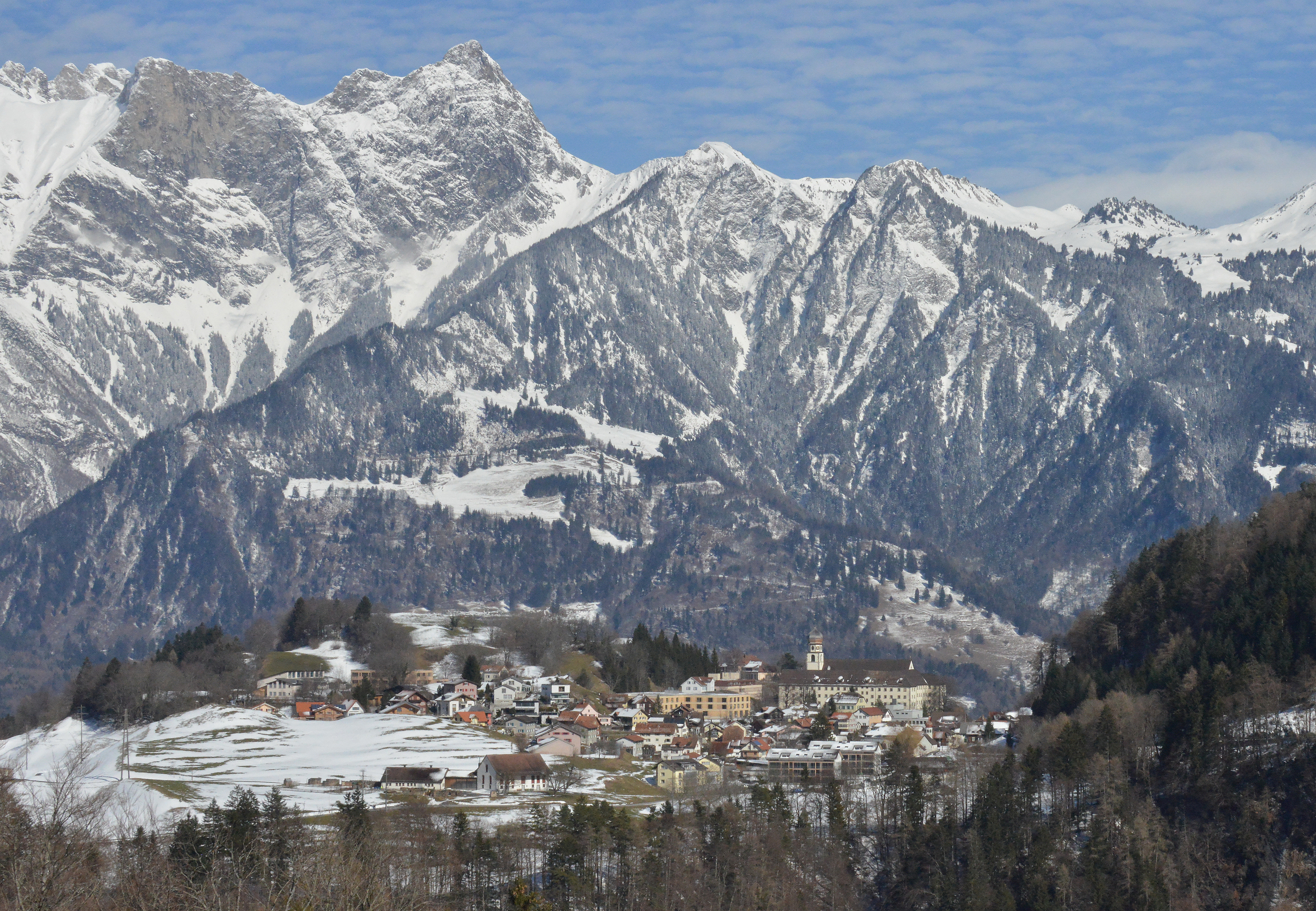

- Coat of arms
- Location of Pfäfers
- Location within Switzerland Location within Canton of St. Gallen
- Coordinates: 46°59′N 9°30′E
- Country: Switzerland
- Canton: St. Gallen
- District: Wahlkreis Sarganserland

Government
  - Mayor: Ferdinand Riederer

Area
  - Total: 128.53 km^{2} (49.63 sq mi)
- Elevation: 840 m (2,760 ft)

Population (December 2020)
  - Total: 1,528
  - Density: 11.89/km^{2} (30.79/sq mi)
- Time zone: UTC+01:00 (CET)
  - Summer (DST): UTC+02:00 (CEST)
- Postal code: 7312
- SFOS number: 3294
- ISO 3166 code: CH-SG
- Localities: Pfäfers, St. Margrethenberg, Vadura, Valens, Vasön, Vättis
- Surrounded by: Bad Ragaz, Felsberg (GR), Flims (GR), Glarus Süd (GL), Chur (GR), Landquart (GR), Mels, Tamins (GR), Trin (GR), Untervaz (GR)
- Website: www.pfaefers.ch

Pfäfers is a municipality in the Wahlkreis (constituency) of Sarganserland in the canton of St. Gallen in Switzerland. The villages belonging to this municipality are Pfäfers, St. Margrethenberg, Vadura, Valens, Vasön, and Vättis.

== History ==
The area around Pfäfers, known as the Taminatal, was inhabited in prehistoric times. In the Drachenloch above Vättis, stone tools and bones of bears, perhaps 50,000 years old, were found; examples of these finds are on display in the local museum in Vättis.

Pfäfers became important through the foundation of the Benedictine monastery, Pfäfers Abbey, in the first half of the 8th century. It existed for more than a thousand years and was closed in 1838. Since 1847, the abbey premises have been used as a psychiatric institution.

Pfäfers is first mentioned in 762 as abbas de Fabarias. In 1247 it was mentioned as Pheuers and in 1288 as Pfaevaers. In Romansh it is known as Faveras.

In the 14th century, Walser people settled in the Calfeisental valley, which was flooded in 1976 to form the Gigerwaldsee reservoir. The colony of St. Martin and the Walser house on the Alpine mountain Ebni are still open to visitors.

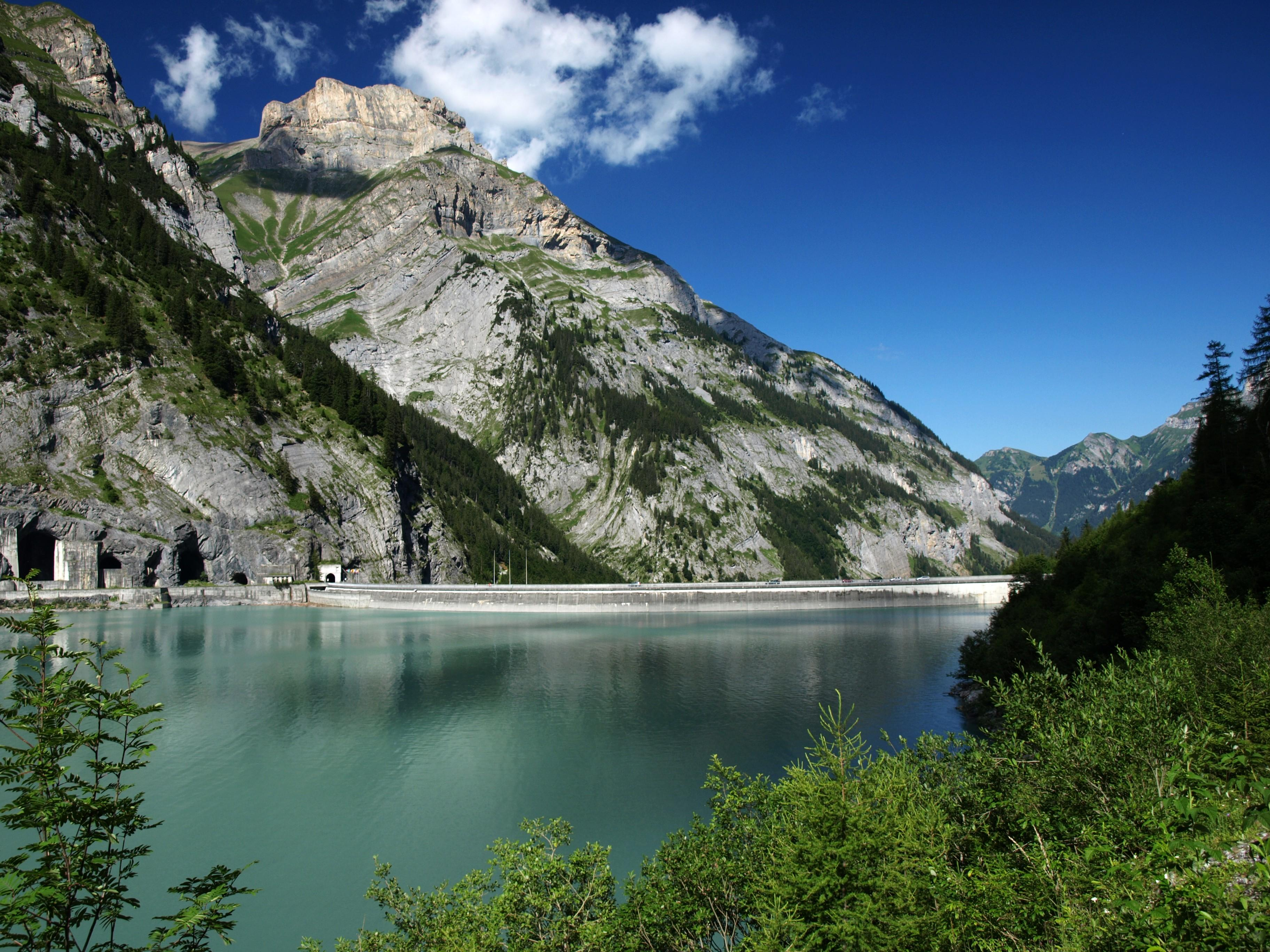
Gigerwaldsee reservoir, with the top of the Gigerwald dam visible

Around 1240, the thermal spring in the Taminaschlucht ("gorge of the Tamina") was discovered. Those who bathed in the curative water were lowered into the narrow gorge on ropes. In 1630, a bath-house was constructed at the mouth of the gorge. The road to Ragaz was built in 1840, and in the following years the cure business was increasingly relocated there. Today, Bad Pfäfers ("Pfäfers Spa"), the oldest Baroque bath-house in Switzerland, houses a restaurant and a museum.

Two important employers for the area are the clinic at Valens, which opened in 1970, and the power plants at Sarganserland, which opened in 1975. The clinic at Valens is specialised in rheumatology, neurology, and orthopaedics. The power plants at Sarganserland run a pumped-storage hydroelectric power plant, using the Gigerwaldsee reservoir and the compensation reservoir.

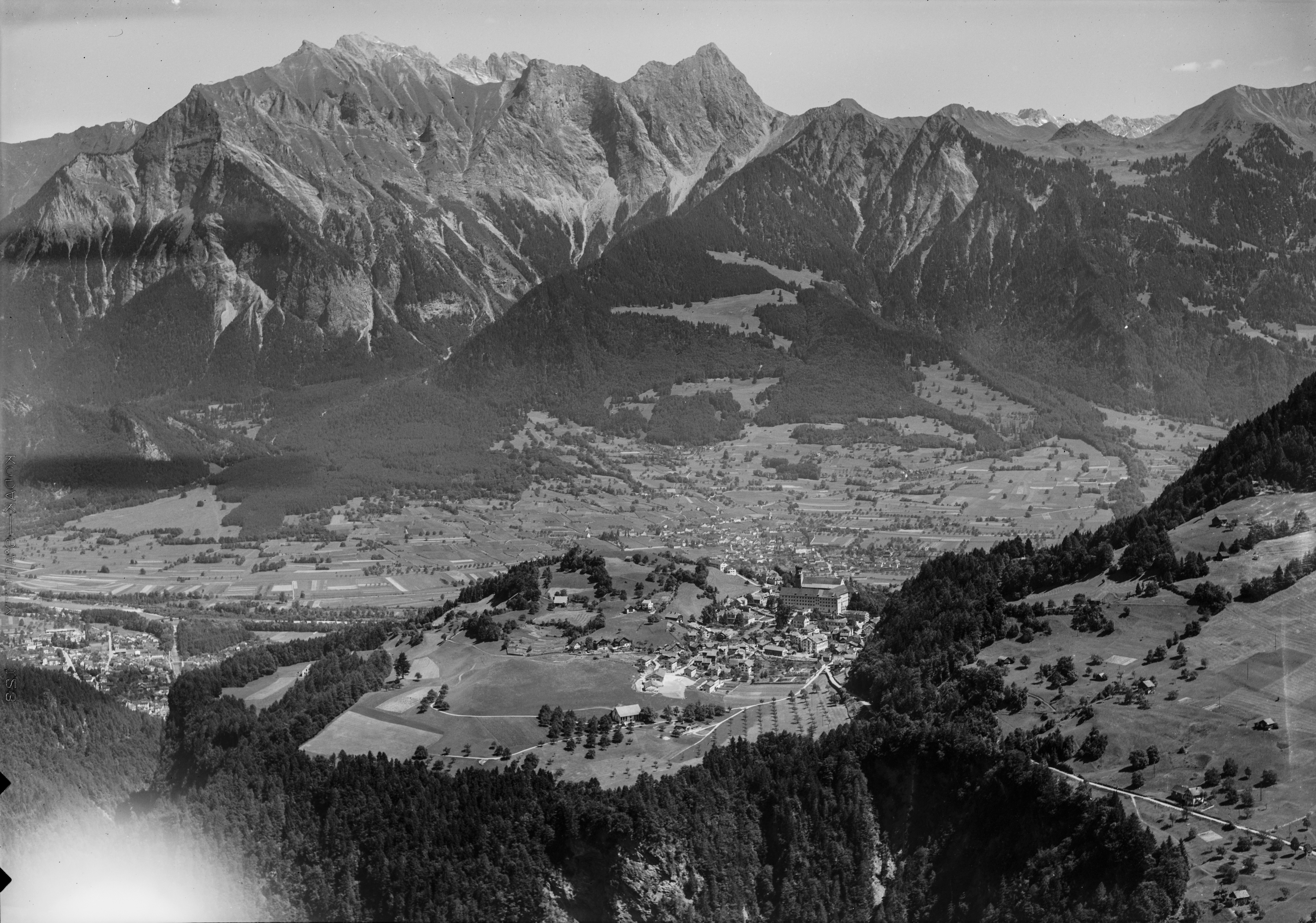
Aerial view (1954)

== Demographics ==
Pfäfers has a population (as of 31 December 2020) of 1,528. As of 2007, about 10.7% of the population was made up of foreign nationals. Of the foreign population, as of 2000, 37 were from Germany, 4 were from Italy, 106 were from the former Yugoslavia, 17 were from Austria, and 63 were from another country. Over the previous 10 years, the population decreased by 6.7%. Most of the population (as of 2000) spoke German (93.3%), with Serbo-Croatian second most common (1.7%) and Portuguese third (1.3%). Of the Swiss national languages (as of 2000), 1,636 people spoke German, 3 spoke French, 5 spoke Italian, and 8 spoke Romansh.

The age distribution in Pfäfers, as of 2000, was as follows: 259 children, or 14.8% of the population, were between 0 and 9 years old, and 269 teenagers, or 15.3%, were between 10 and 19. Of the adult population, 181 people, or 10.3% of the population, were between 20 and 29 years old; 277 people, or 15.8%, were between 30 and 39; 255 people, or 14.5%, were between 40 and 49; and 185 people, or 10.5%, were between 50 and 59. The senior population distribution was 154 people, or 8.8%, between 60 and 69 years old; 116 people, or 6.6%, were between 70 and 79; 51 people, or 2.9%, were between 80 and 89; and 7 people, or 0.4%, were between 90 and 99.

In 2000, there were 197 persons, or 11.2% of the population, living alone in a private dwelling. There were 303, or 17.3%, who were part of a couple, married or otherwise committed, without children, and 1,026, or 58.5%, who were part of a couple with children. There were 82, or 4.7%, who lived in a single-parent household, while 5 were adult children living with one or both parents, 14 lived in a household made up of relatives, 2 lived in a household made up of unrelated persons, and 125 were either institutionalised or live in another type of collective housing.

In the 2007 federal election, the most popular party was the SVP, which received 41.6% of the vote. The next three most popular parties were the CVP (24.6%), the SP (14.9%) and the FDP (10.6%).

The historical population is given in the following table:

Year	Population
1831	1,634
1850	1,315
1900	1,510
1950	1,900
2000	1,754

== Education ==
In the municipality of Pfäfers, there are three kindergartens, three primary schools, and one high school. One kindergarten and one primary school are located in each of Pfäfers, Vättis, and Valens. The high school in Pfäfers educates children from the whole municipality.

In Pfäfers, about 68% of the population between the ages of 25 and 64 have completed either non-mandatory upper secondary education or additional higher education, either at a university or a Fachhochschule. Out of the total population in Pfäfers, as of 2000, the highest education level completed by 352 people, or 20.1% of the population, was primary education, while 620 people, or 35.3%, had completed secondary education, 133 people, or 7.6%, had attended a tertiary school, and 82 people, or 4.7%, were not in school. The remainder did not answer this question.

== Economy ==
As of 2007, Pfäfers had an unemployment rate of 0.61%. As of 2005, there were 142 people employed in the primary economic sector and about 57 businesses involved in this sector. There were 86 people employed in the secondary sector and 24 businesses in this sector. There were 843 people employed in the tertiary sector, with 45 businesses in this sector.

As of October 2009, the average unemployment rate was 1.1%. There were 129 businesses in the municipality, of which 26 were in the secondary sector of the economy and 47 were in the tertiary sector.

As of 2000, there were 513 residents who worked in the municipality, while 311 residents worked outside Pfäfers and 420 people commuted into the municipality for work.

== Religion ==
According to the 2000 census, 1,300 people, or 74.1%, were Roman Catholic, while 217, or 12.4%, belonged to the Swiss Reformed Church. Of the rest of the population, 6 people, or about 0.34%, belonged to the Christian Catholic faith; 30 people, or about 1.71%, belonged to the Orthodox Church; and 3 people, or about 0.17%, belonged to another Christian church. There were 60 people, or about 3.42%, who were Muslim. Another 10 people, or about 0.57%, belonged to another church not listed in the census; 67 people, or about 3.82%, belonged to no church or were agnostic or atheist; and 61 people, or about 3.48%, did not answer the question.

== Coat of arms ==
The blazon of the municipal coat of arms is Gules a Dove volant Argent membered of the first having a sprig in the mouth.

According to a legend, Pirmin wanted to build a friary in the region of Landquart. While the workers were cutting down trees, one of them accidentally injured his leg. When the monks cared for the injured man, a snow-white dove appeared; it took a blood-sprinkled splint and flew away. The monks followed the dove and found it in the Taminatal, where it had alighted on a tree. Saint Pirmin took this as a sign from God and decided to build the friary at the present site.

This tale is illustrated on the ceiling paintings of the church in Pfäfers.

== Leisure ==
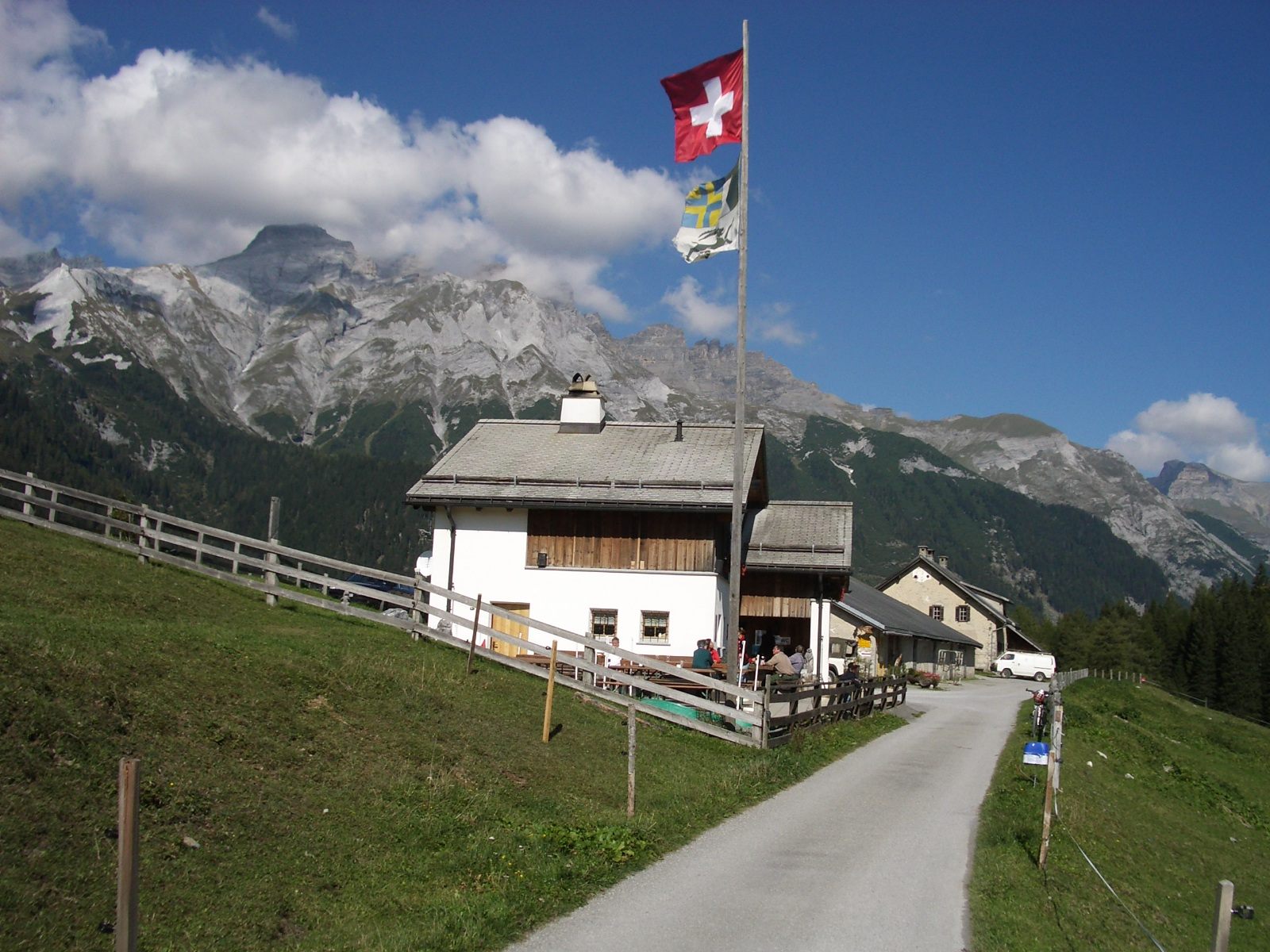
Kunkelspass

The most visible landmark of Pfäfers is the Baroque minster at the entrance to the village.

Cross-country skiing is possible in St. Margrethenberg and Vättis.

== Transport ==
Pfäfers and Valens are connected to Bad Ragaz by separate roads. Historically, the only way to get from one village to the other was via Bad Ragaz, but the Tamina Bridge over the Tamina Gorge opened in 2017 to connect Pfäfers and Valens. The road network is important for the valley. The bus system connects each village with Bad Ragaz, which provides access to the railway system.

Wartensteinbahn was a funicular railway between Bad Ragaz and Wartenstein from 1892 to 1964.

== Geography ==
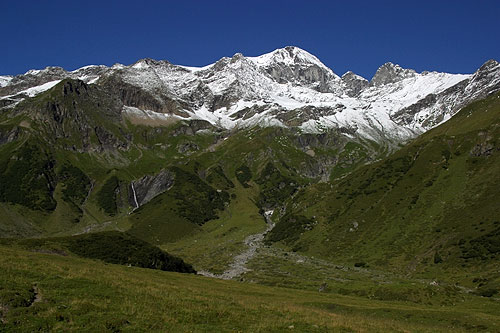
Calfeisental valley

Pfäfers has an area of 128.4 km^{2} (49.6 sq mi). Of this area, as of 2006, 29.4% was used for agricultural purposes, while 30.6% was forested. Of the rest of the land, 1.1% was settled, consisting of buildings or roads, and the remainder, 38.9%, was non-productive, consisting of rivers or lakes.

The municipality is located in the Sarganserland Wahlkreis. It stretches from the Taminatal south to the Kunkelspass and west into the high Calfeisental valley. The municipality has some of the largest elevation differences of any municipality, from Tamina Gorge at 693 m (2,274 ft) to the Ringelspitz at 3,247 m (10,653 ft). It consists of the village of Pfäfers at the mouth of the Tamina Valley on a plateau above the Rhine, the villages of Valens, Vasön, and Vättis, as well as the hamlets of St. Margrethenberg and Vadura.

== Localities ==
=== Pfäfers ===
The municipality of Pfäfers contains the village of Pfäfers itself and the hamlets of St. Margrethenberg and Vadura. Pfäfers lies about 800 meters (2,600 ft) above sea level at the entrance to the Taminatal. It has about 600 inhabitants.

The most important employer, with a total of 245 employees, is the clinic St. Pirminsberg, which specialises in psychiatry, psychotherapy, and addiction treatment. People with mental illness from the southern part of the Canton of St. Gallen and from Liechtenstein are treated there. Other employment is provided by agriculture, forestry, and small businesses.

The control centre and the Mapragg equalising reservoir of the Bad Sarganserland power plants are located in Vadura. The pumped-storage hydropower plant produces 444 million kWh of electricity per year.

Places of interest

- Wartenstein ruins
- Old Bath Pfäfers, with the Paracelsus museum and bath museum
- Hot spring at Bath Pfäfers
- Taminaschlucht
- Natural bridge
- Former Fort Furggels

=== Vättis ===
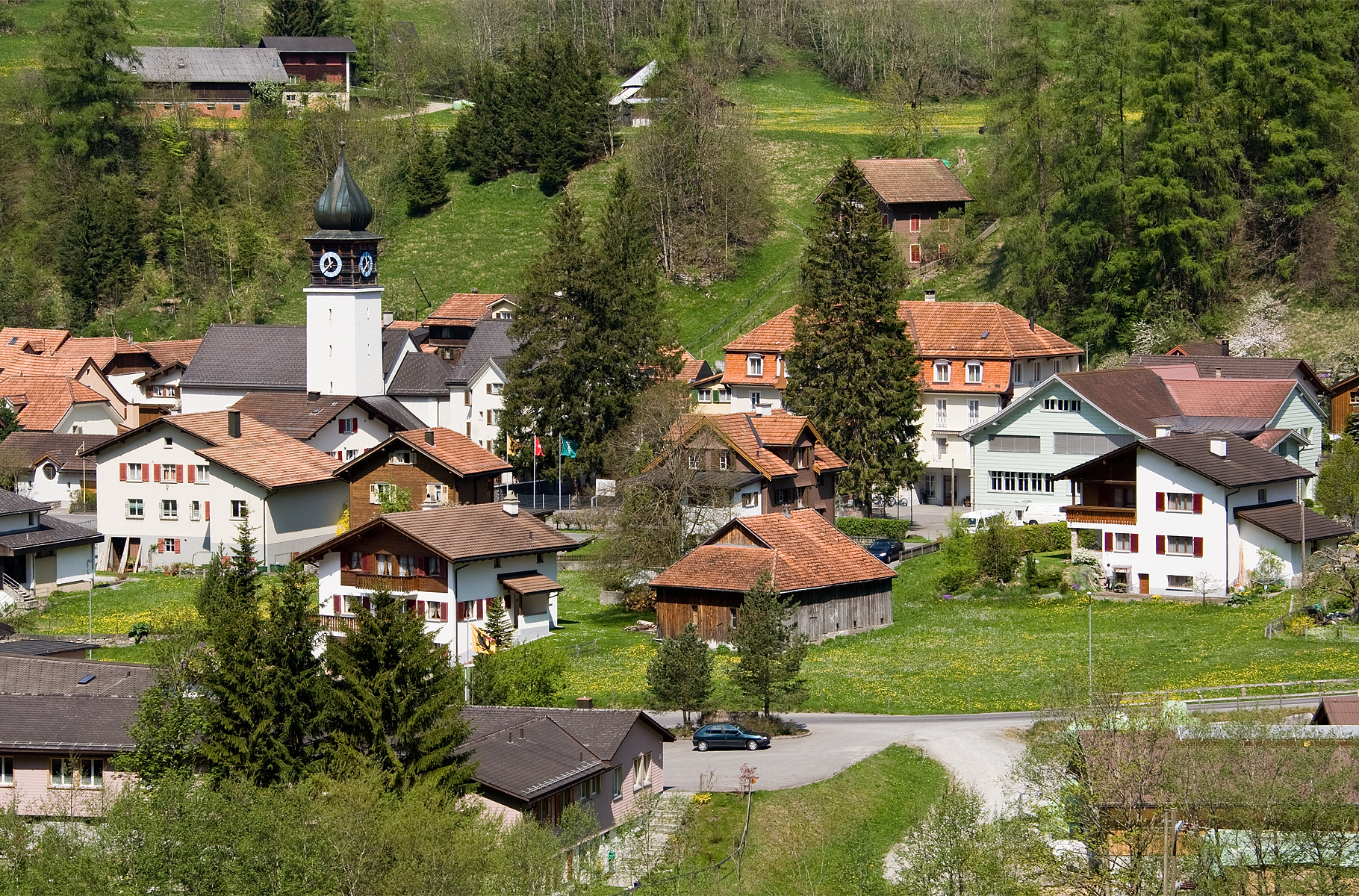
Vättis

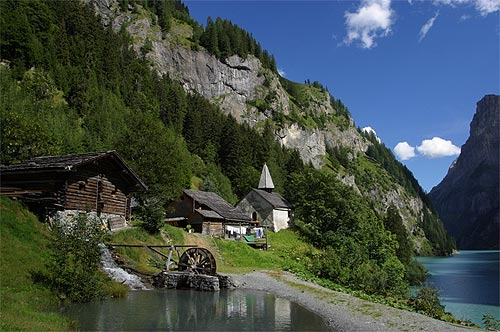
Sankt Martin

Vättis lies about 940 meters (3,080 ft) above sea level and has approximately 460 inhabitants. The main economic activities are agriculture, forestry, and secondary-sector industry.

One place of interest is the Drachenloch museum, where finds from the prehistoric site are on display. Gaspus houses the lower station of the cableway to Vättnerberg. Numerous hiking routes into the Alps start at Vättnerberg.

Behind Vättis lies the Calfeisental valley, which is also a popular hiking area.

Places of interest

- Drachenloch, a high-altitude prehistoric site
- Drachenloch museum
- Walser colony of St. Martin
- Walser house on Alp Ebni
- Calfeisental nature reserve and Graue Hörner hunting ban area
- Glarus thrust, a geological feature and candidate for UNESCO World Heritage status
- Gnapperkopf silver mine

=== Valens ===
Valens, at 920 meters (3,020 ft) above sea level), including the hamlets Balen and Gassaura, has c. 400 inhabitants. The village is built on the east side of a shallow valley, which gives it a sunny location.

The clinic in Valens is the most important employer. It specialises in rheumatology, neurology, and orthopaedics, with treatments supported by therapies using hot spring water. The hot spring bath is also open to the public.

=== Vasön ===
Vasön has about 100 inhabitants and lies 920 meters (3,020 ft) above sea level. Agriculture and forestry are important in this small village. Several hiking routes start in Vasön.

== Heritage sites of national significance ==
The Old Bath Pfäfers, the ruins of Wartenstein Castle, the former Benedictine abbey, and the Paleolithic caves at Drachenloch in Vättis are listed as Swiss heritage sites of national significance.

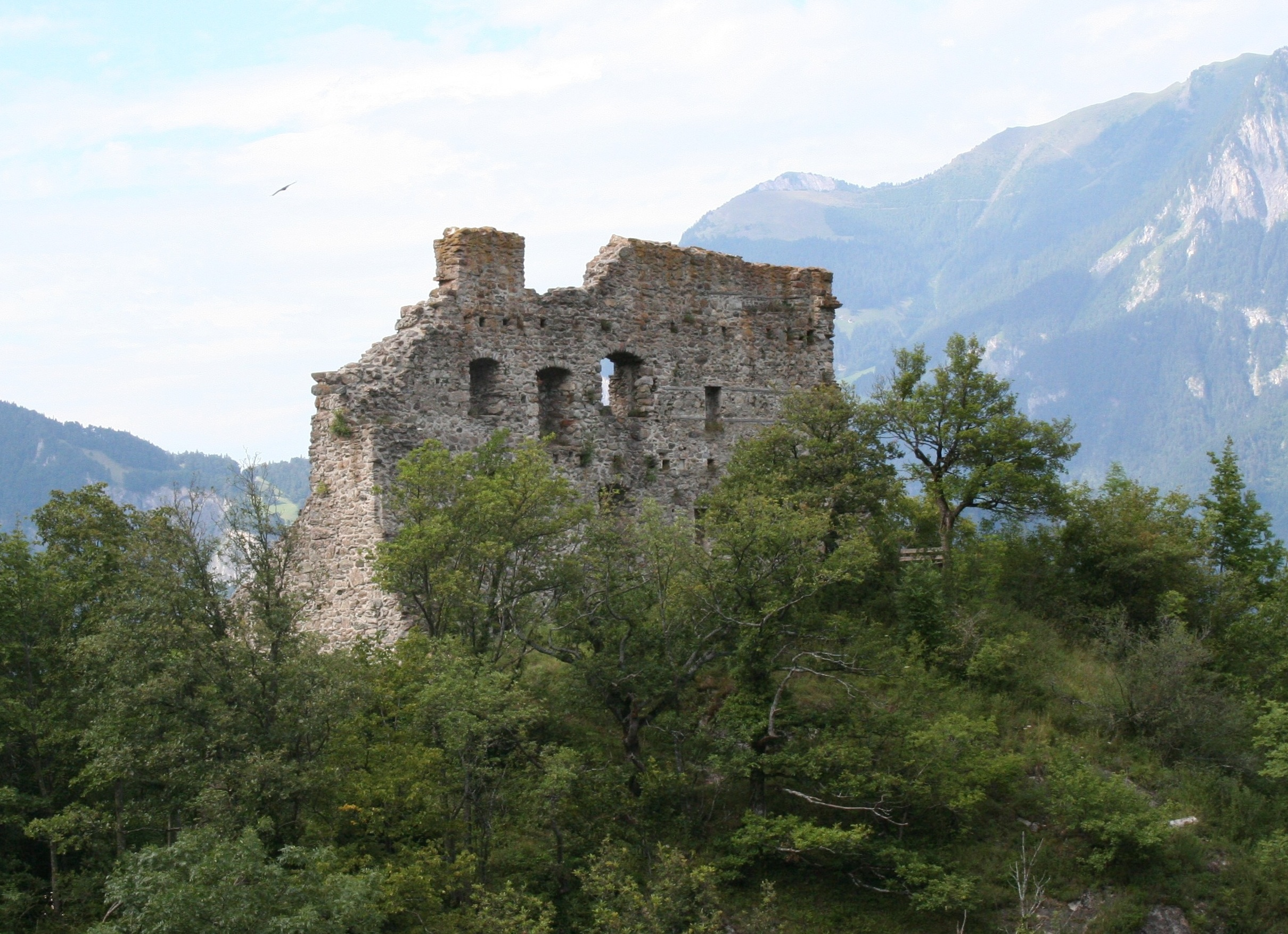
Wartenstein Castle ruins

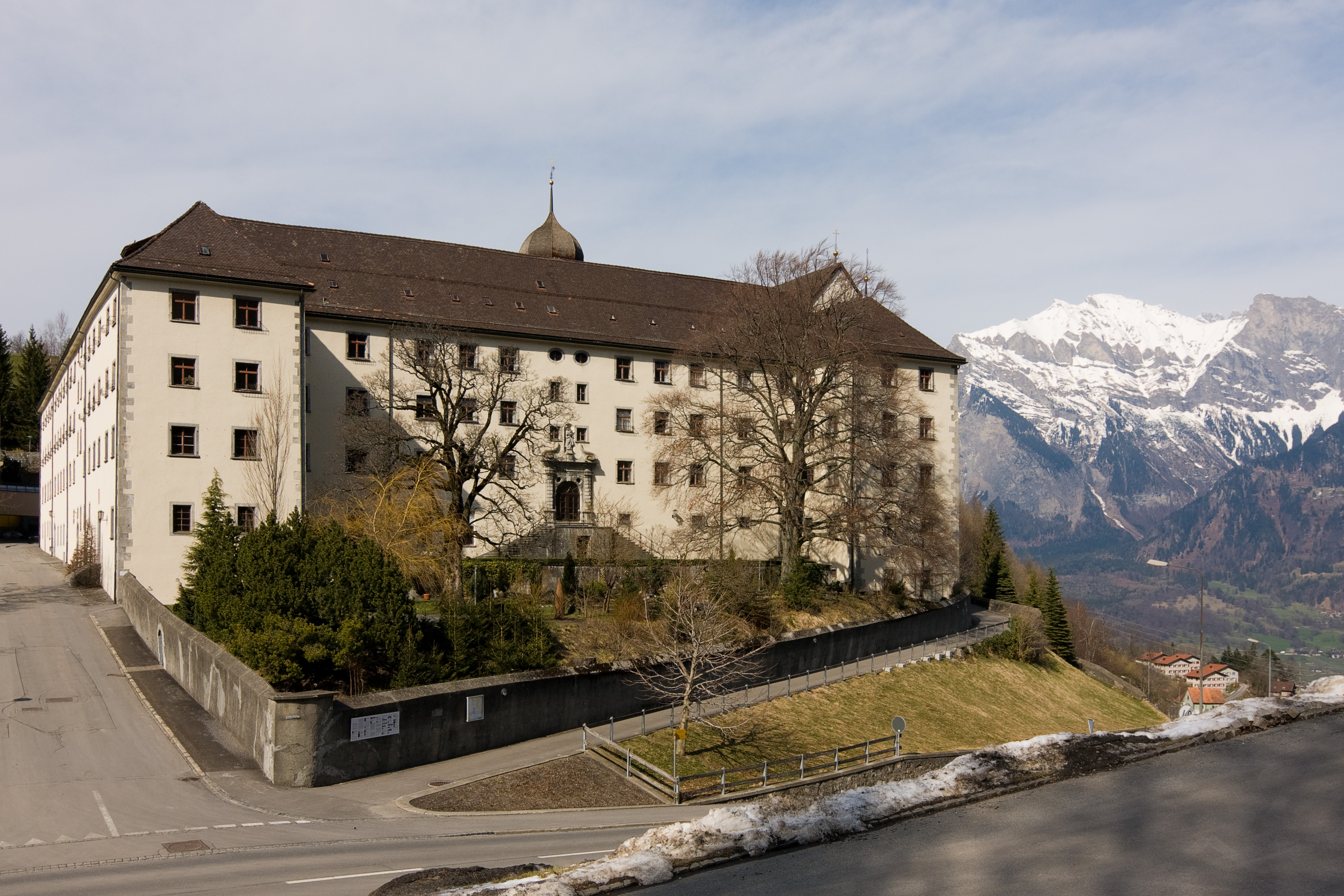
Pfäfers Abbey
