= Stausee Mapragg =

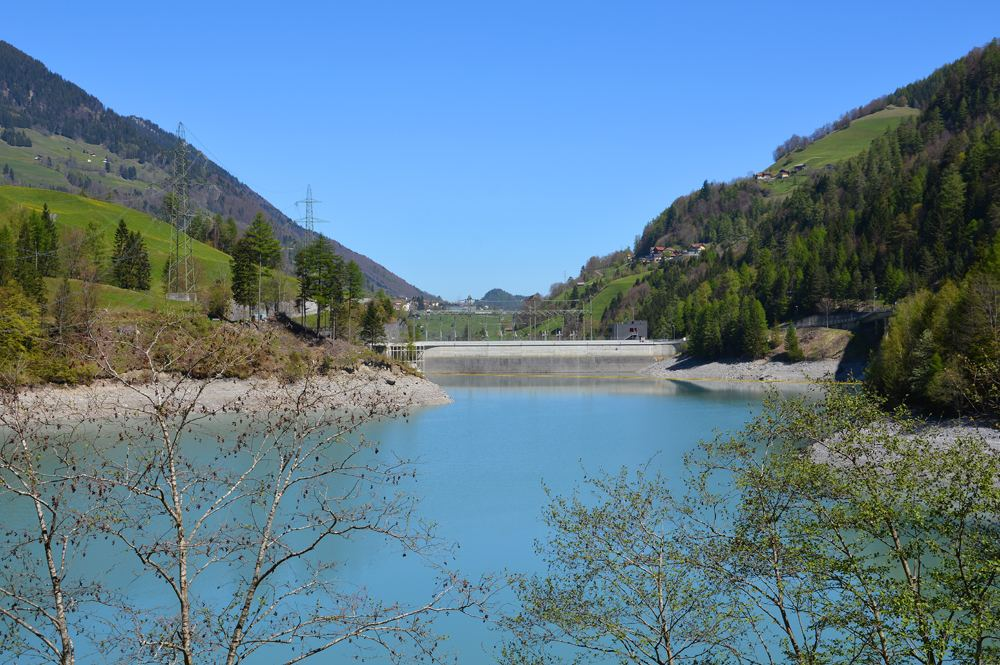

- Location within Canton of St. Gallen Location within Switzerland Location within Alps
- Interactive map of Stausee Mapragg
- Location: Pfäfers, St. Gallen
- Coordinates: 46°56′40″N 9°28′50″E
- Type: reservoir
- Catchment area: 114 km^{2} (44 sq mi)
- Basin countries: Switzerland
- Surface area: 26 ha (64 acres)
- Water volume: 5.3 million cubic metres (4,300 acre⋅ft)

Stausee Mapragg (Mapragg reservoir) is located at Pfäfers in the Canton of St. Gallen, Switzerland. Its surface area is 26 ha (64 acres). The reservoir and Gigerwaldsee are operated by Kraftwerke Sarganserwald (NOK group) for pumped-storage hydroelectricity.

== See also ==
- List of mountain lakes of Switzerland
