= Pfäfers Abbey =

Benedictine monastery in Pfäfers

Coordinates: 46°59′26″N 9°30′7.5″E

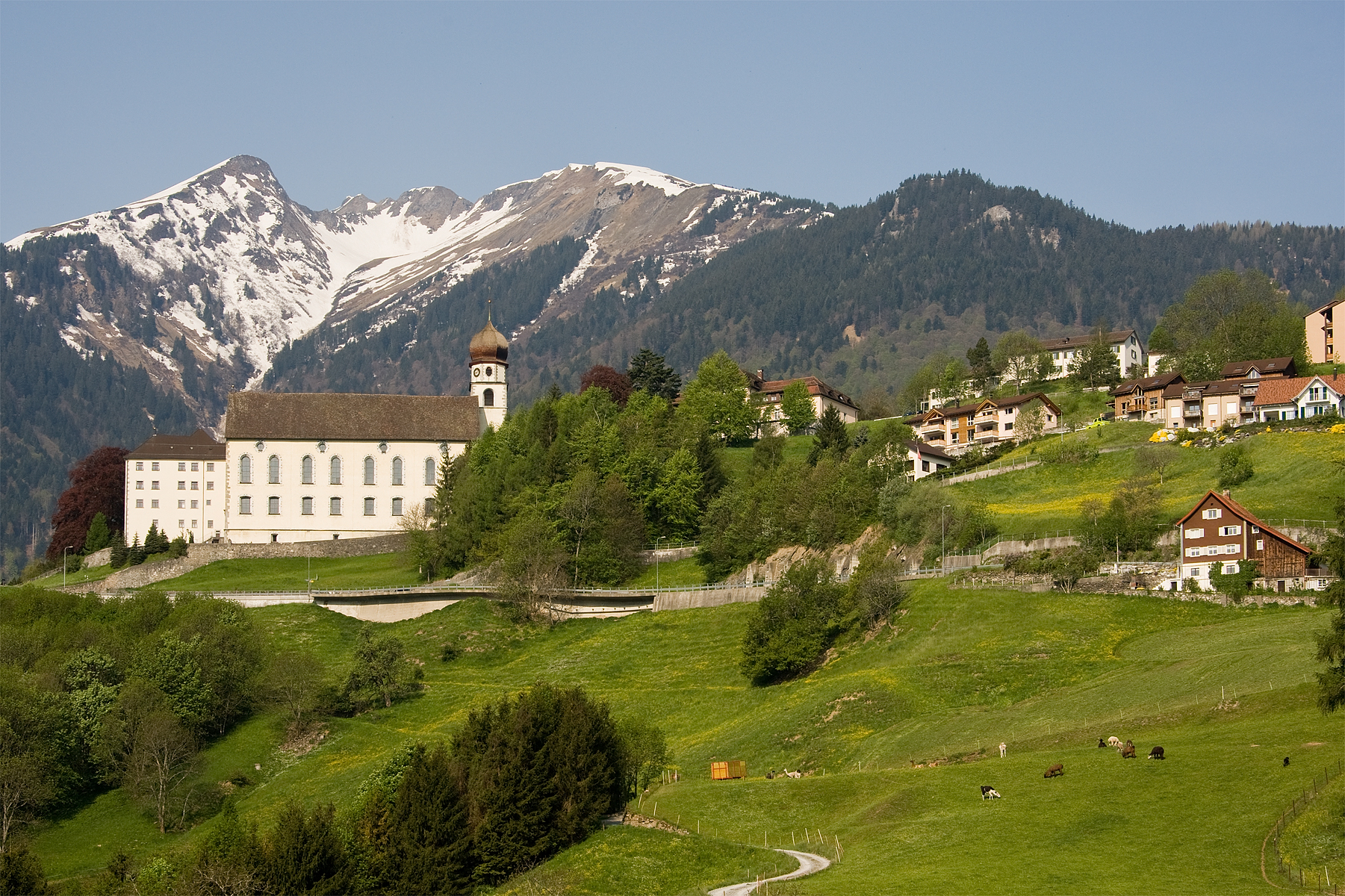
- Pfäfers Abbey, with Bad Ragaz upslope to the northeast
- Interactive map of Pfäfers Abbey

Monastery information
- Order: Benedictine
- Established: 731

Site
- Location: Pfäfers, Switzerland

Pfäfers Abbey (German: Kloster Pfäfers), also known as St. Pirminsberg from its position on a mountain, was a Benedictine monastery in Pfäfers near Bad Ragaz, in the canton of St. Gallen, Switzerland.

Situated at the junction of the Tamina and Rhine valleys, it flourished as a religious house and owner of lands and serfs, as well as assuming extraordinary importance as a political and cultural centre of the Chur–Raetian region.

== History ==
=== Middle Ages ===
According to the chronicles of Hermann of Reichenau, Pfäfers Abbey was founded from Reichenau Abbey in 731, as Monasterium Fabariense (Latin for bean field); the first monks came from Reichenau. The founding legend refers to the itinerant bishop Saint Pirmin, with the first documentary mention of the abbey in 762. The monastery controlled the important route through the Kunkels Pass to the passes into Italy in the Graubünden. After the bishop's seat of Chur the monastery was the most important religious centre in Chur-Raetia and the diocese of Chur. Many parishes in the region were founded from Pfäfers in the 9th and 10th centuries. The substantial influence of the monastery was concentrated in eastern Switzerland, especially between Weesen and Maienfeld, but reached as far as present-day Baden-Württemberg, in the Val Bregaglia, the Vinschgau and the County of Tyrol.

In 840, Emperor Lothair I, king of Northern Italy and, nominally, Emperor of the Franks, assured the monastery the right of freely electing its abbot. This was extended in 861 to include ecclesiastical immunity and royal protection. The East Frankish king Louis the Child gave Pfäfers, in 905, to Solomon III, Bishop of Constance, who was also the abbot of St Gall. Between 914 and 949, the Abbey of St. Gall and the bishop of Chur fought over the protectorship of the Abbey. Otto I, Holy Roman Emperor, finally confirmed again in 949 the right of free election of the abbot to the monks themselves. During the Investiture Controversy, Pfäfers again fell under foreign control, however. In 1095, Henry IV gave the abbey to the diocese of Basel, which exchanged the abbey with Henry V in 1114 for the castle of Rappoltstein in Alsace; only the intervention of Pope Paschal II in 1116 restored the monastery's freedom. During the early Middle Ages Pfäfers remained the most important monastery in the diocese of Chur, and intellectual centre of the region. The three most important Chur-Raetian manuscripts were made in Pfäfers: Liber Aureus (the main source for the abbey's history), Liber viventium (the abbey's memorial book) and Vidimus Heider (the abbey's cartulary).

In 1208, Otto IV, Holy Roman Emperor, passed Vogtei (protectorship) of the monastery to the Barony of Sax, to whom the monks pledged at least partial allegiance. In 1257, Abbot Rudolf bought back their freedom for 300 silver marks and, in 1261, transferred it to the Lords of Wildenberg of Freudenberg Castle. In the 14th century there were two separate Vogtei over the monastery and the upper Taminatal: Castle Freudenberg and Ragaz. Later, the protectorship passed to the counts of Werdenberg-Sargans and Werdenberg-Heiligenberg. In 1397, the monastery again bought back their Vogtei and, in 1408, King Rupert granted the monastery the privilege to choose its own protector.

Following the acquisition of the county of Sargans as a Gemeine Herrschaft of the Old Swiss Confederacy, the abbey became a Swiss protectorate in condominium between Sargans and the Acht Orte of the Confederacy minus Berne. The monastery was caught in the turmoil of the Swabian War and the Protestant Reformation and the general financial and political difficulties that engulfed the region. Abbot John Heider (1586–1600) managed briefly to restore the original position of the monastery, but under his successors the situation worsened so the Swiss Confederacy took over administration of the monastery.

=== 17th century ===
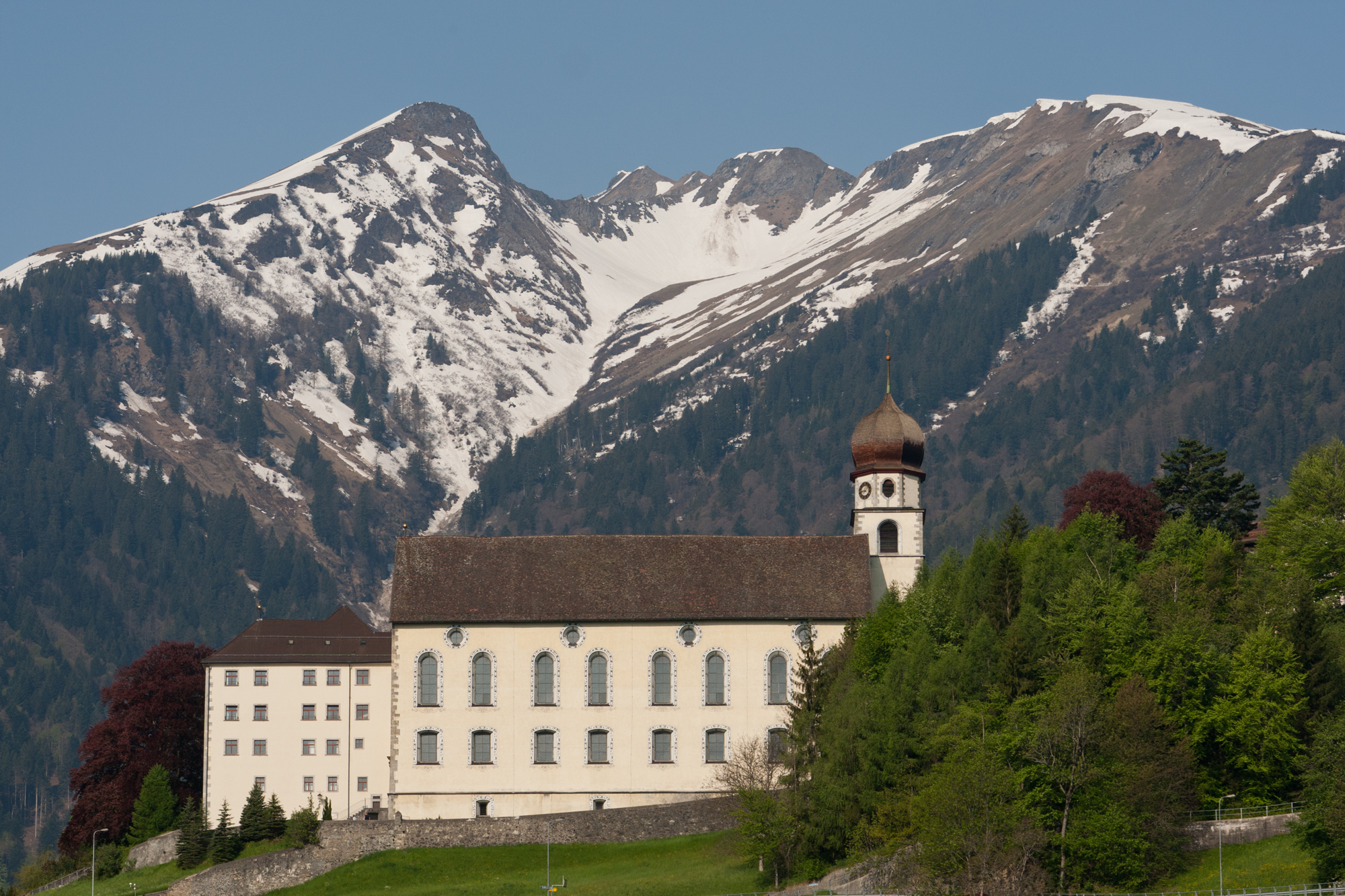
Pfäfers Abbey and the Alps

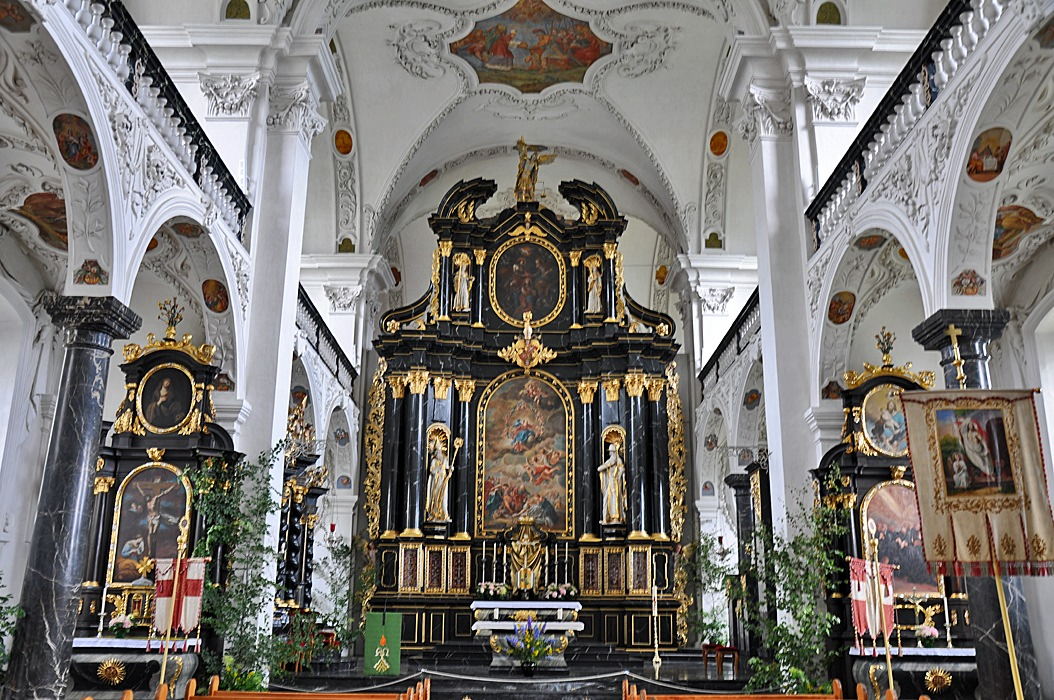
Baroque church interior of Pfäfers Abbey

In 1665 a fire destroyed the medieval monastery and church. In 1672, Abbot Justus Zink presented plans by John Serro and Giuglio Barbieri for rebuilding the abbey, in the Baroque style, closer to the mountain slope, in the present dominant position, with the first rooms ready for occupation in 1674. Because of the disastrous financial situation, Abbot Zink was forced to resign in 1676, passing control to the Swiss Congregation of the Benedictine Confederation. His successor, Abbot Boniface I Tschupp, managed the financial recovery and completed the construction in 1694, with the new abbey church dedicated in the same year.

=== 18th century ===
The election of the abbot caused controversy in 1734 as Zürich—one of the Swiss cantons in condominium over the abbey—refused to confirm the election of abbot Ambrosius Müller; Johann Jakob Scheuchzer was therefore commissioned to examine the royal privileges of the abbey. Some of the Imperial and Papal papers confirming rights of the monastery were identified as 17th-century forgeries. Negotiations at the 1738 Tagsatzung finally confirmed the rights of the abbey over three towns or villages in the modern day municipality of Pfäfers – Pfäfers, Vättis and Valens, as well as Ragaz, in today's municipality of Bad Ragaz. The abbey is physically located in modern Pfäfers; just outside the border of Bad Ragaz.

In 1794, a revolt of the monastery's subjects was crushed by the Vogt of Sargans. On 11 November 1798, during the French Revolutionary Wars, the county of Sargans was released by the Confederation and Abbot Benedict Bochsler had to free his subjects in a similar manner. After the French invasion, the monastery was abolished and partially destroyed. In 1801, the abbot returned with some brothers and, in 1803, the monastery was formally restored, after the founding of the canton of St. Gallen.

=== 19th century ===
Financial struggles prompted the last abbot of the monastery Plazidus Pfister to request the secularization of the abbey, a request to which Pope Gregory XVI acceded in a letter dated 20 March 1838. On 20 November 1838, the Great Council of the canton of St Gallen declared that the monastery be secularised and removed its assets. The Catholic Church tried to claim the assets in vain, conceding them to St Gallen in November 1839. On 14 November 1845, in the buildings of the abbey was founded the cantonal asylum of St. Pirminsberg, today's St Pirminsberg Psychiatric Hospital. The precious artefacts from the abbey were auctioned and scattered in museums around the world. Konrad von Ritter from Wolfurt took possession of the famous Wolfurter cup (German: Wolfurter Kelch), created in the monastery in the 13th century. In 1853, the archives of the monastery were passed to Stiftsarchiv St Gallen, the archives of the Abbey of Saint Gall.

From 1619 to 1845 the bones of the archpriest Nicolò Rusca were kept in the Pfäfers monastery; he is currently nominated for beatification. Today these relics are in the Collegiate Church of Sondrio in Valtellina.

== Sources ==
- Historisch-Biographisches Lexikon der Schweiz: Volume V, Neuchâtel, 1929. 414 pages.
- Paul Diebolder: Aus dem Kulturleben der Benediktiner-Abtei Pfäfers im Mittelalter und deren Beziehungen zu Liechtenstein, 1931
- Das Kloster Pfävers, edited by the St Gallen Historical Society, St. Gallen, 1883
- Die Abtei Pfäfers — Geschichte und Kultur, Stiftsarchiv St Gallen, 1983 und 1985.
