= Pro Patria =

Pro Patria (Latin: For the fatherland) may refer to:

== Organisations ==
- Royal Swedish Pro Patria Society, a Swedish patriotic and charitable organization founded in 1798
- Pro Patria (Switzerland), a Swiss patriotic and charitable organization founded in 1909
- Pro Patria (Estonian political party), an Estonian political party

== Distinctions ==
- Pro Patria Medal (disambiguation)
  - Pro Patria Medal (South Africa), a South African military campaign medal
  - Pro Patria Medal (Poland), a civil state decoration of Poland

== Culture ==
- Pro Patria (Coates) (1917), a pamphlet of poetry by Florence Earle Coates published in support of American involvement in World War I
- Pro Patria (sculpture), a large bronze sculpture at the Indiana World War Memorial Plaza
- Pro Patria Finlandia, the ninth full-length studio album by the band Impaled Nazarene
- Pro Patria (album), an album by Signal Aout 42

== Sports ==
- Aurora Pro Patria 1919, an Italian football club
- Pro Patria Milano, an Italian athletics club

== See also ==
- National Pro Patria Party, a defunct Salvadoran political party.
- Dulce et decorum est pro patria mori, a line from the Roman poet Horace
