= Karl Bickel =

Swiss artist and stamp designer (1886–1982)

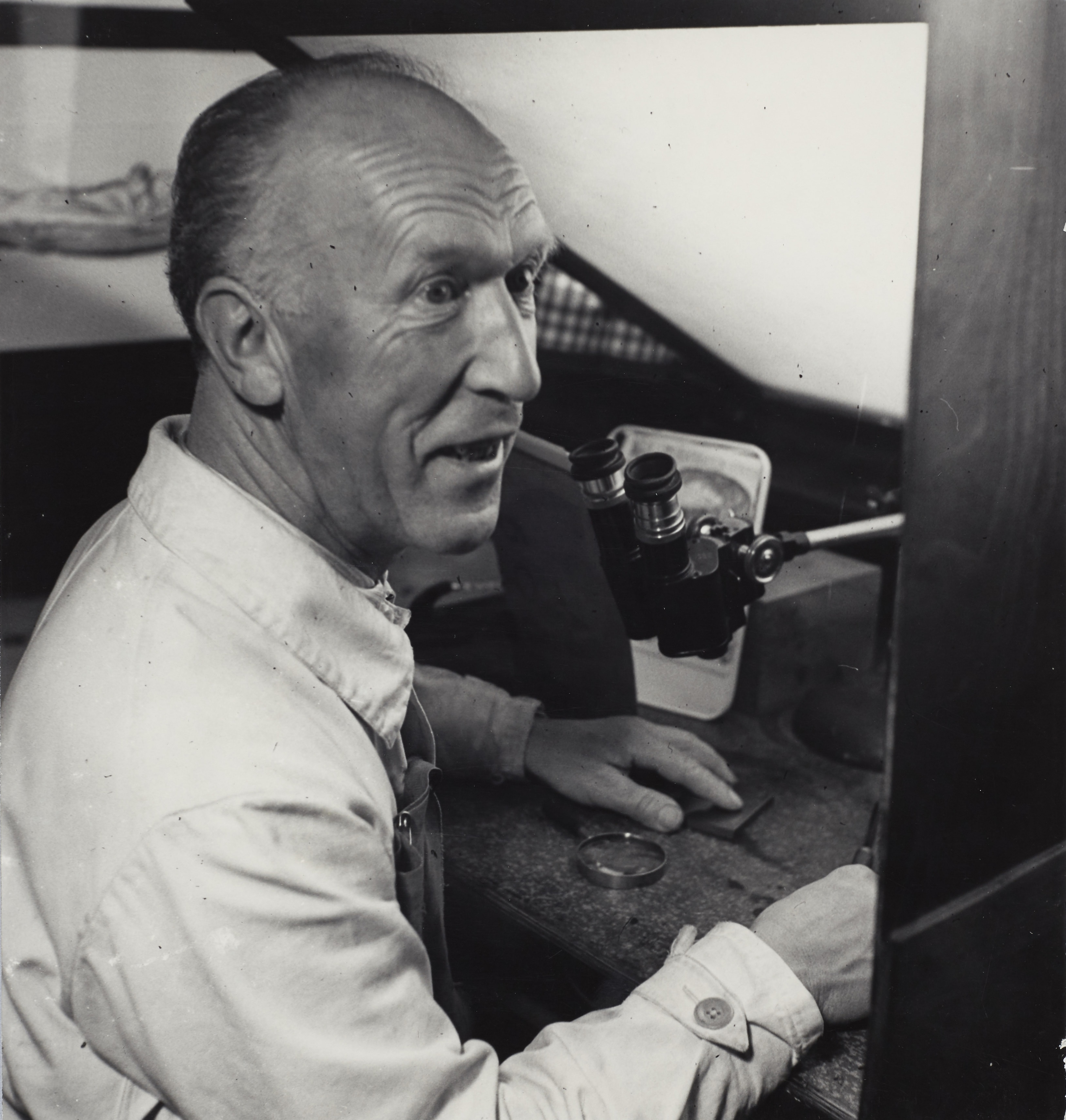
Karl Bickel at work as engraver

Karl Bickel (1886–1982) was a Swiss engraver and graphic designer also known for the construction of the Paxmal memorial above Walenstadt. During his career he designed one hundred Swiss stamps but also others for the countries Luxemburg, Portugal and Liechtenstein.

== Early life education ==
Karl Bickel trained as a lithographer and stereotype designer between 1900 and 1904 following which he entered into service to the graphic designer Hüttner. He followed up on his studies and attended evening courses in drawing and graphic at the Zurich University of the Arts. In 1908 he opened his own graphic design studio in Zurich. In 1912 he trained as a sculpture in Carrara, Italy. where he contracted the pulmonary disease Tuberculosis and entered a sanatorium in Walenstadtberg in 1913 and 1914.

After having recovered in 1914, Bickel returned to Zurich where he designed posters, often in collaboration with an other graphic designer. The studio had a focus on fashion catalogues and designs of posters for cultural events. Several of his poster were inspired by the works of the Swiss painter Ferdinand Hodler. In 1922 he closed the studio. From 1923 onwards he would be an engraver for the Swiss postal services. He was responsible for several sets of Swiss stamps, including the first airmail stamp of the Swiss Postal Telegraph and Telephone services (PTT) in 1923. He also designed some engravings for the portrait stamps for the Pro Patria and Pro Juventute.

== In Schriina Hochrugg ==
In 1924 he settled to Schriina Hochrugg above Walenstadtberg where he began to construct a house which eventually would become the peace memorial Paxmal. For Pro Juventute all portrait stamps between 1932 and 1964 were designed by Karl Bickel. In 1924 the PTT would present the Universal Postal Union with an etching of the UPU monument in Bern designed by Karl Bickel. For the end of World War II in May 1945, he designed together with Aldo Patocchi thirteen stamps ranging from 5 cents to 5 CHF which were to symbolize peace. He quit from the PTT in 1965.

=== Paxmal ===
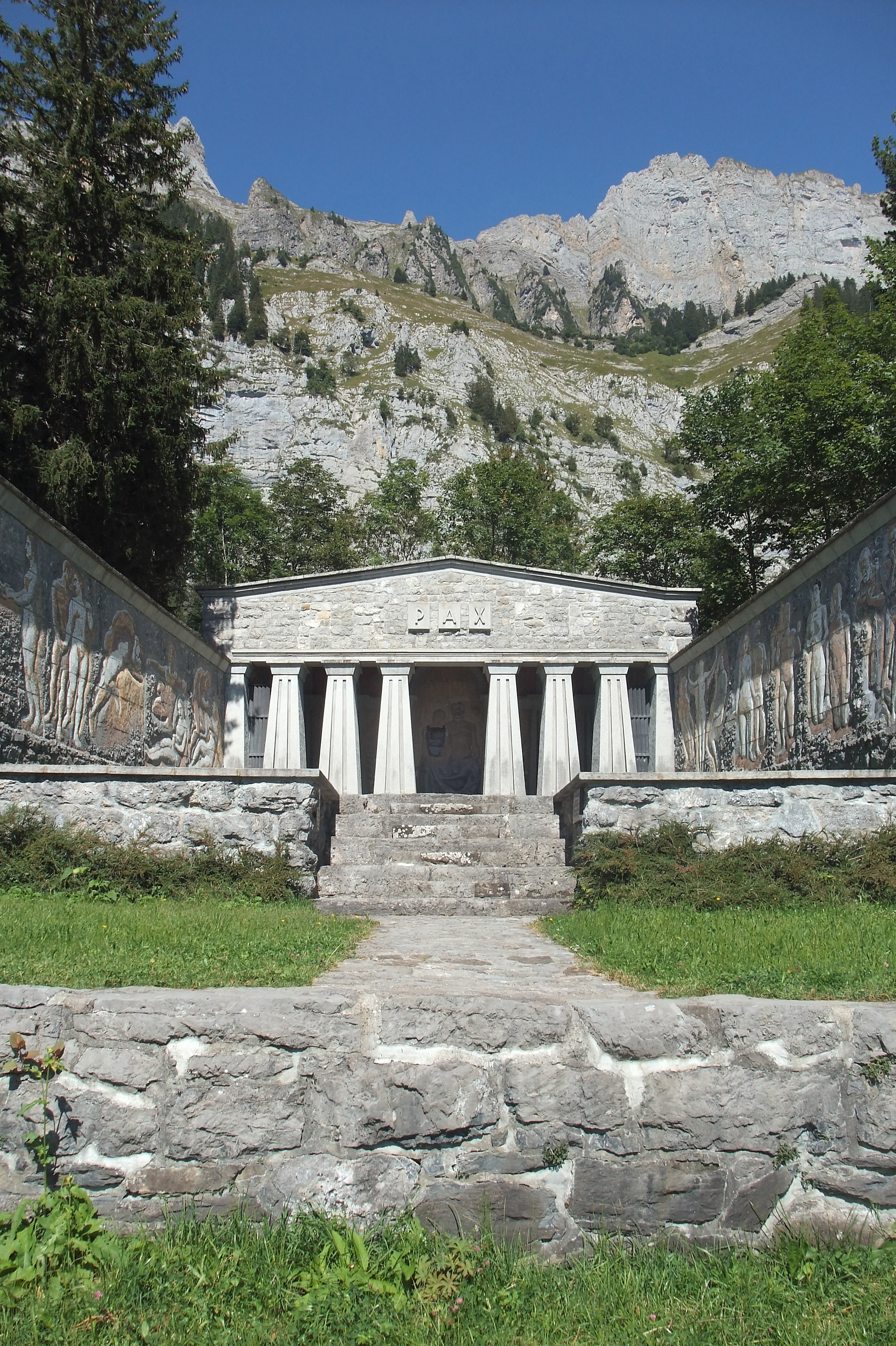
The Paxmal with the background of the Churfirsten

Between 1924 and 1949 he constructed a monument to peace Paxmal, a Neo Greek temple adorned with mosaics. It is located in Schrina Hochrugg above Walenstadt. In 1932 he began to build mosaics using weather resistant stone which adorn three sides of the Paxmal. Man, woman, relationship and the creation of a new human and finally complete family are depicted on the mosaics on the left wall. The right wall includes the struggles of life and concludes in a working community. In the center the grown man is shown. He would donate the Paxmal to his employer PTT in 1966.

== Legacy ==
A museum was constructed in his memory in Walenstadt in Canton St.Gallen. It was inaugurated in 2002. It is located in a disestablished textiles factory. The philatelist Heinrich Moser is said to have assembled a collection of all his stamps.

== Personal life ==
In 1924 he moved from Zurich to Schriina Hochrugg above Walenstadtberg where he built a house which would later become the Paxmal.
