= County of Sargans =

State of the Holy Roman Empire

County of Sargans Grafschaft Sargans
- 11th century? – 1798
- Coat of arms of Sargans Coat of arms of the Werdenberg counts

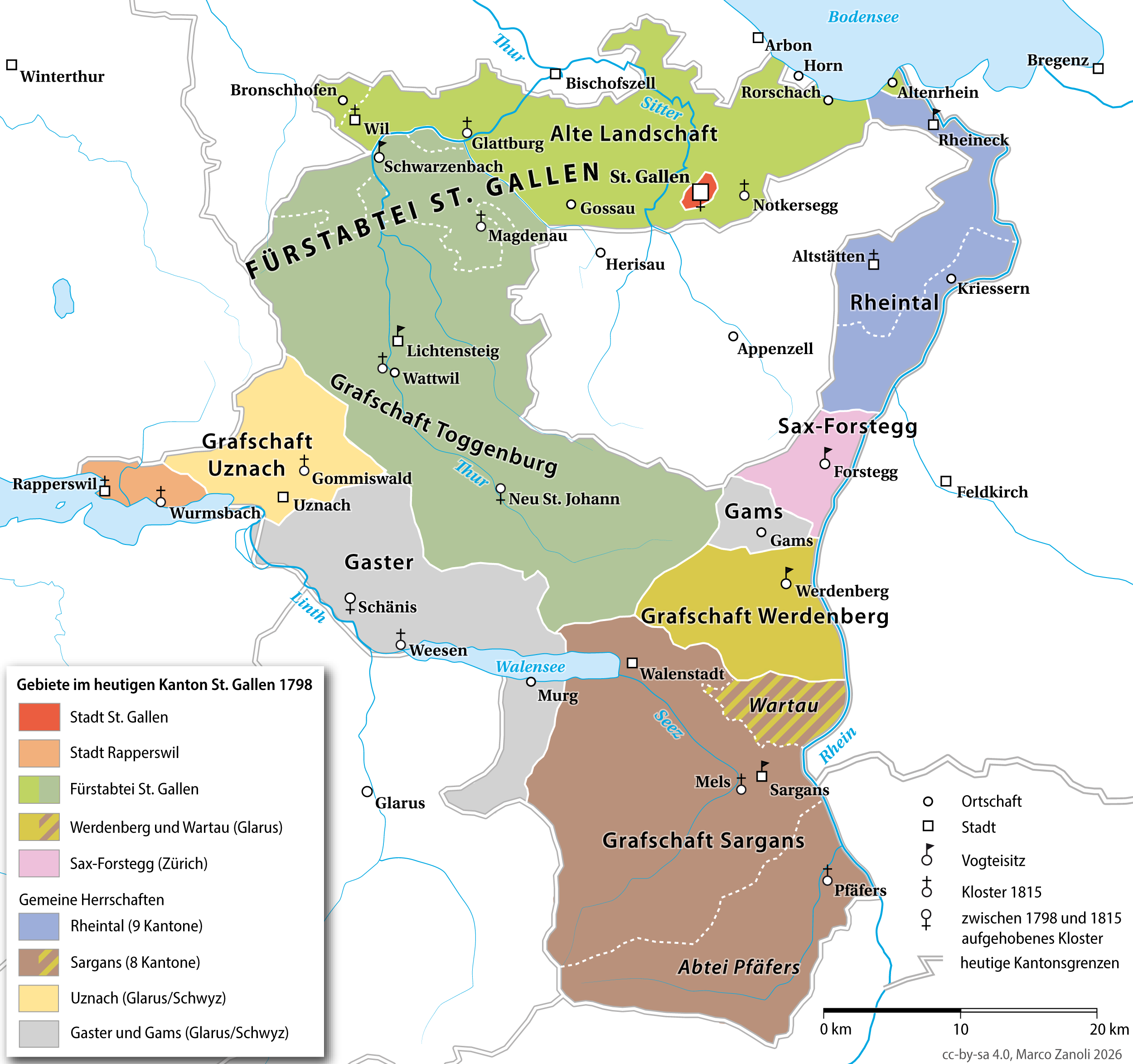
- The County of Sargans, shown in turquoise – with the Imperial Abbey of Pfäfers, of which the counts were Vögte, protectors – in the south of this map of what became the canton of St. Gallen
- Status: State of the Holy Roman Empire, Condominium of the Old Swiss Confederacy
- Capital: Sargans
- Historical era: Middle Ages
  - Established: before 1200 11th century
  - County pawned to Habsburgs: 1396
  - County redeemed from Toggenburgers: 1436
  - Allied with Switzerland in the Old Zürich War: 1440–46
  - Condominium of the Old Swiss Confederacy: 1458–1798
  - Annexed to Helvetic canton of Linth: 1798
  - Joined St Gallen: February 19, 1803
Preceded by	Succeeded by
Duchy of Swabia; Raetia Curiensis	Canton of Linth

The County of Sargans was a state of the Holy Roman Empire. From 1458 until the French Revolutionary War in 1798, Sargans became a condominium of the Old Swiss Confederacy, administered jointly by the cantons of Uri, Schwyz, Unterwalden, Lucerne, Zürich, Glarus and Zug.

== History ==
In 1396, the counts of Werdenberg-Sargans pawned Sargans to the Habsburg dukes of Austria, who passed the territory to Friedrich VII, count of Toggenburg. After the death of the last Toggenburgers, the counts of Werdenberg-Sargans redeemed the pledge, to rule over the county anew, with Walenstadt and Quarten remaining as Vogtei (protectorates) of the Habsburgs. The inhabitants of the country refused, however, to recognise the counts of Werdenberg-Sargans as their lords and, in 1436, made a treaty with the city of Zürich.

In the Old Zürich War, a civil war between Zürich and the cantons of Glarus and Schwyz, the counts allied themselves with the opponents of Zürich. Schwyz and Glarus conquered the county and forced the population to carry out, for the count von Werdenberg-Sargans, the Oath of Loyalty.

In 1458, the counts renewed their association with Schwyz and Glarus. Nevertheless, the Eidgenossen kept Walenstadt, Nidberg and Quarten, which they had conquered from the Habsburgs. In 1482–83, the last count sold Sargans to become a shared territory of the seven cantons of the Old Swiss Confederation. (Whilst there were eight cantons to Switzerland, Bern was not involved in this transaction.) The purchase of 1483 stood at the conclusion of a decades-long expansionist policy of the Confederation in the east of Switzerland.

The joint administration of the Landvogtei was quite normal for the 15th-century acquisitions of Switzerland. The administration alternated, every two years, between Zurich, Luzern, Uri, Schwyz, Unterwalden, Zug and Glarus. From 1712, after the second war of Villmergen, Bern became involved in the condominium, with the Lordship of Freudenberg (Imperial Abbey of Pfäfers) and Walenstadt joining the jointly administered territories. From 1483, Quarten became part of the Vogtei of Windegg, but it remained subordinate to the blood court (Blutgerichtsbarkeit) of Sargans.

A special case was the area of the today's municipality of Wartau. It belonged to the County of Sargans, with exception of the Lordship of Wartau, which covered only Wartau Castle and the village of Gretschins (now part of Wartau). The Lordship was legally closely interlaced with the remaining area of the today's municipality Wartau, but was subordinate to the jurisdiction of the County of Werdenberg. In 1517, when Werdenberg became a part of Glarus, this legal situation led to numerous conflicts in 1694–95 between the Landvögte of Werdenberg and Sargans over "Wartauer trade", which was taken as far as the Tagsatzung, a Swiss confederal council.

In 1798, most of the county was given liberty as an independent canton of Sargans, until the county was annexed to the Canton of Linth in the Helvetic Republic, later in the same year. When Napoleon's Act of Mediation restored the Old Swiss Confederation in 1803, Sargans passed to the newly established canton of St. Gallen.

== Counts of Sargans ==
See Counts of Werdenberg in Sargans

=== House of Werdenberg ===
(The counting of the counts follows the counts of Werdenberg)

- Hartmann I (1248–1264), son of Rudolf I of Werdenberg, m
- Rudolf II (1264–1322), son, married Adelheid von Burgau ()
- Rudolf III (1322–1325), son, married
- Rudolf IV (1325–1361), brother, m. . Ruled together with Rudolf III until his death
- John I (1361–1396), pawned the county to Austria (1396), died 1399

The county is pawned to Austria and delivered to the Toggenburgs:

=== House of Toggenburg ===
Ruler	Portrait	Born	Years	Marriage	Death	Notes
Donat (Donat. von Toggenburg)		1358; Third son of Frederick V and Kunigunde of Vaz or von Vatz	1396–1400	Agnes of Habsburg-Laufenburg (1387–1425) two children	7 November 1400	
Frederick (Friedrich VII. von Toggenburg)		c.1380 Son of Diethelm VI and Catherine of Werdenberg-Heilingenberg	1400–1436	Elisabeth von Mätsch three children	30 April 1436; Feldkirch aged c. 55/56	

==== Titular counts of Werdenberg from the House of Werdenberg ====
- John I (1396–1399)
- George I (1399–1412), with:
  - Wilhelm I (1399–1412)
  - John II (1399–1405)
  - Hugh I (1399–1421)
  - Heinrich I (1399–1436)

In 1436 the county returns to the Werdenbergs:

=== House of Werdenberg ===
- Heinrich I (1436–1447), recovered Sargans in 1436
- Wilhelm I (II) (1447–1474), with:
  - George I (II) (1447–1483), sold county to Swiss Confederacy

== Gallery ==
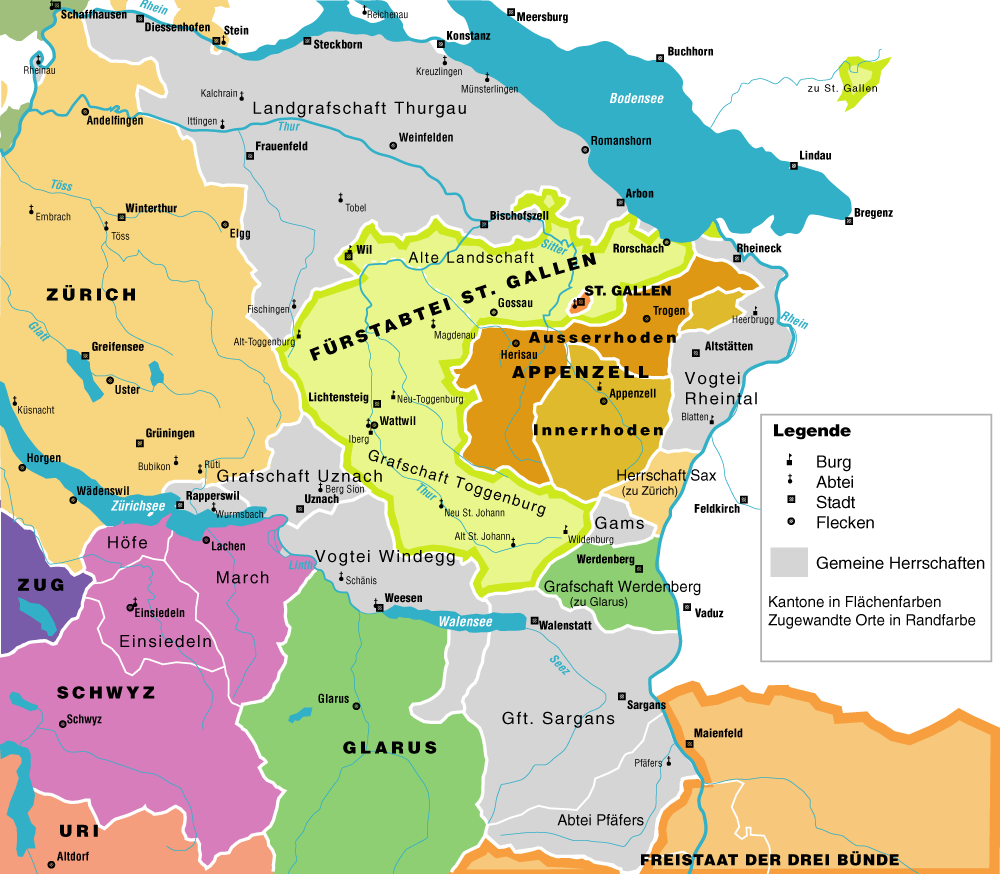
Eastern Switzerland in 1798, with shared territories in grey and associate members of the Confederacy outlined. The County of Sargans can be seen in the south, between the two parts of Glarus (green).

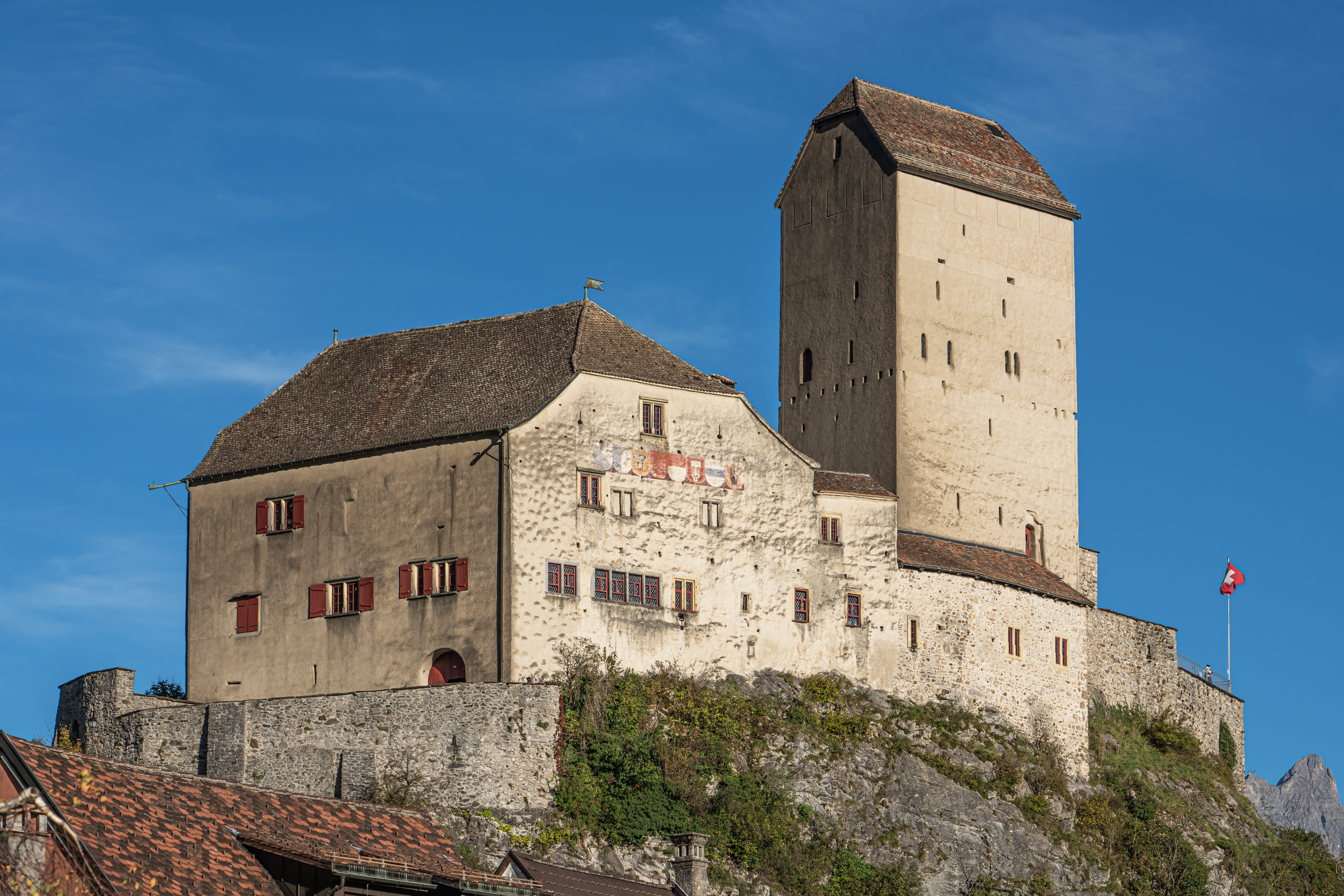
Sargans Castle, with the coats of arms of the seven cantons sharing jurisdiction visible on the left-hand side

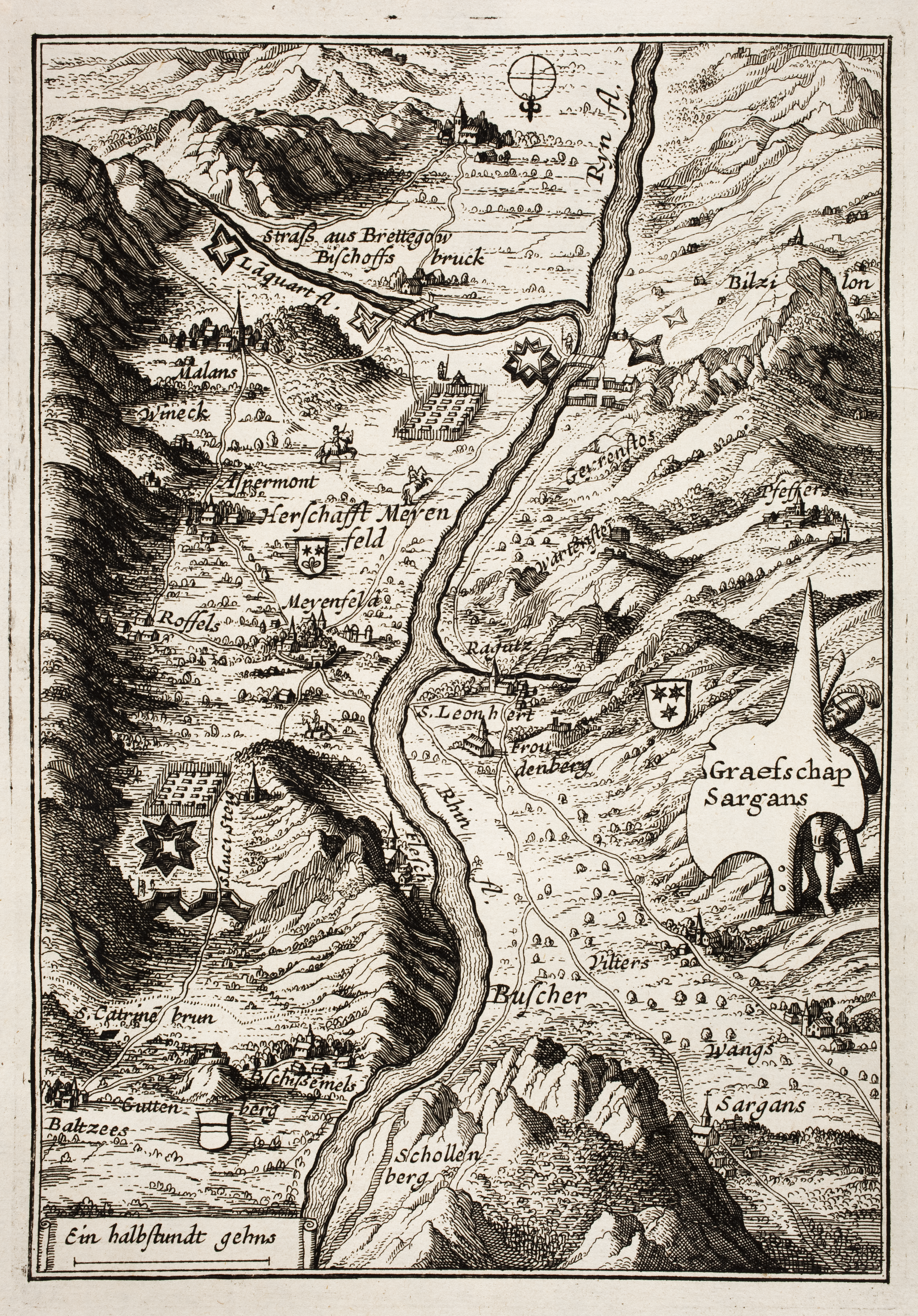
Country of Sargans, with the coats of arms and fortifications
