= Emil Carelius =

Swedish conductor and merchant

Johan Emil Seth Carelius (21 February 1878 in Stockholm–27 September 1966 in Stockholm), was a Swedish conductor and merchant, associated with the Swedish Royal Court, active in the Royal Court Orchestra.

== Distinctions ==
=== Orders ===
- Sweden: Knight of the Order of the Polar Star
- Sweden: Knight of the Order of Vasa
- Norway: Knight 1. Class of the Order of St. Olav
- Finland: Knight 1. Class of the Order of the White Rose of Finland
- Italy: Knight of the Order of the Crown of Italy
- Belgium: Officer of the Order of Leopold II
- Latvia: Order of the Three Stars
- Bulgaria: RKkr

=== Academic ===
- (Sweden) Associé n:o 157 of the Royal Swedish Academy of Music

=== Other ===
- Sweden: Litteris et Artibus
- Sweden: Gold medal of the Royal Swedish Pro Patria Society
- (Sweden) Stockholm: Saint Eric's Medal
- Silver Medal of the Red Cross of Sweden
- Medal of the Red Cross of Austria
- (Kingdom of Prussia) Medal of the Red Cross of Prussia
- Honorary plaque of the Associations of Singers of Sweden, Norway, Denmark and Finland
