= Paxmal =

Monument in St. Gallen, Switzerland

Coordinates: 47°8′32″N 9°16′12″E

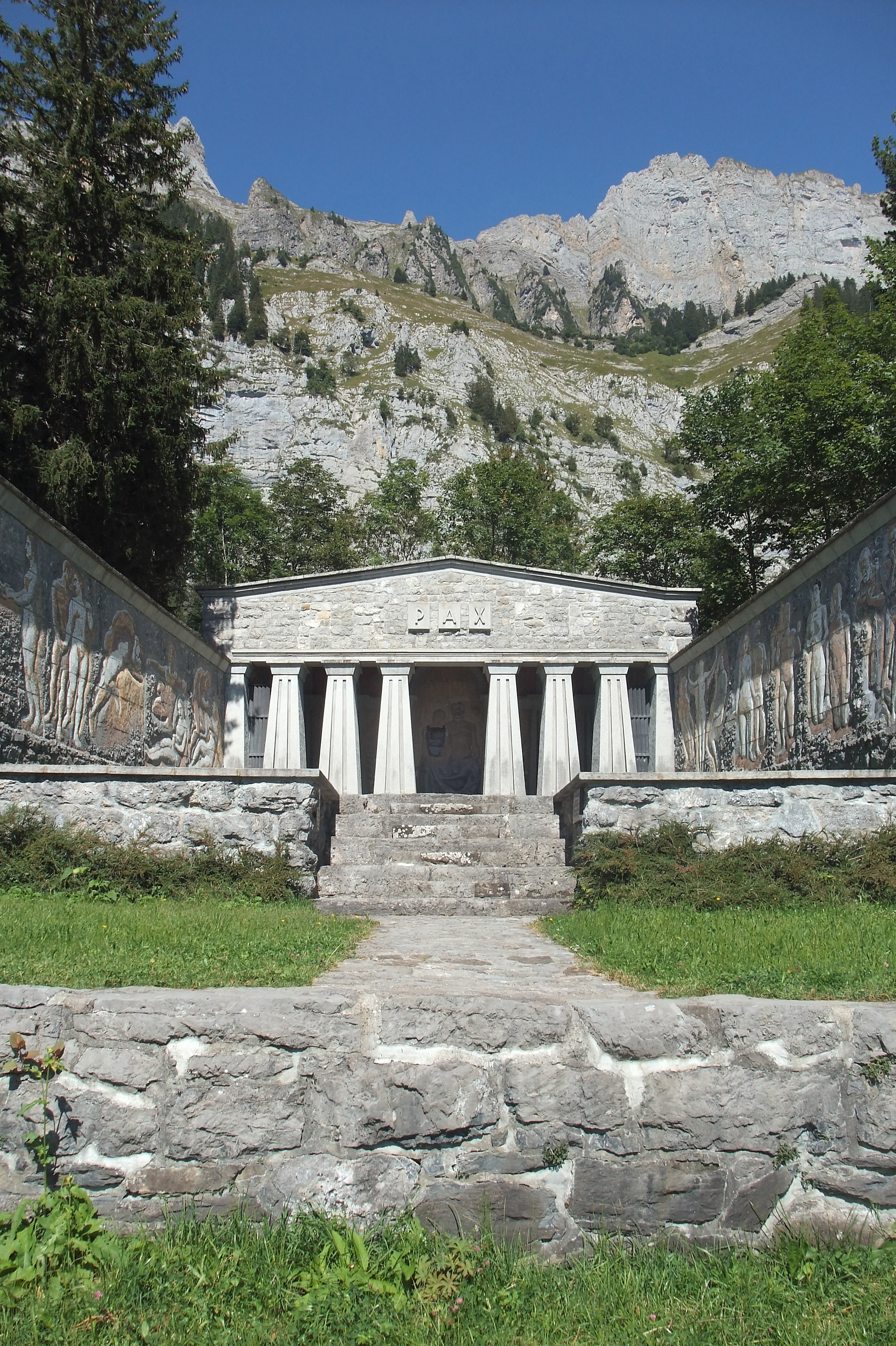
The Paxmal Monument

The Paxmal is a peace monument built by Karl Bickel between 1924 and 1949, in Walenstadtberg above Walenstadt, in front of the Churfirsten mountain range in Switzerland.

The left wall depicts the earthly life: a human couple in its existence and development, love and procreation. The right wall is devoted to the spiritual life: the beings who are awakened, struggling, and which keep growing.

Karl Bickel was a Swiss artist who worked for the Swiss Post as a stamps graphic designer.
