= Dulce et decorum est pro patria mori =

Quote from Horace's Odes

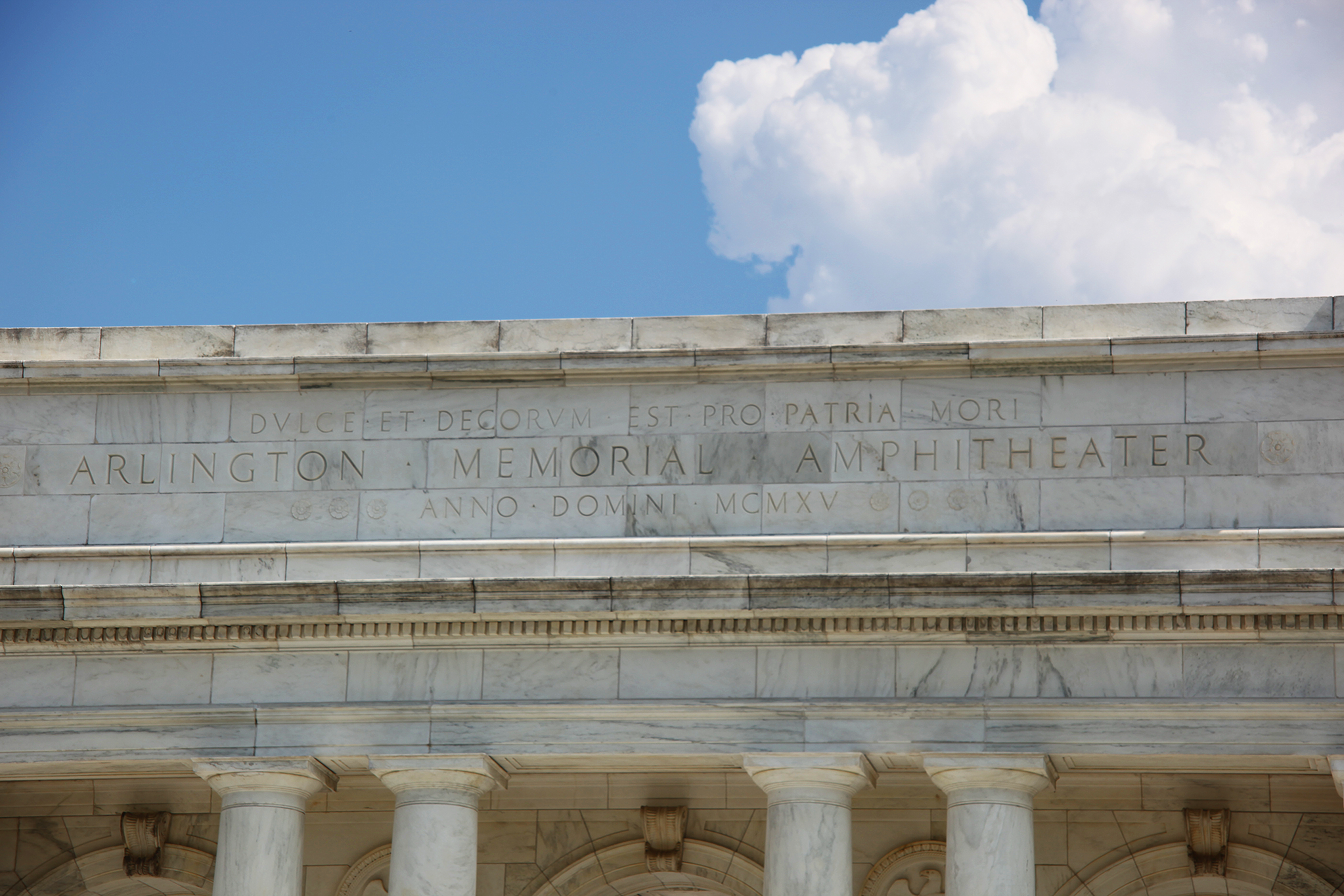
Detail of the inscription over the rear entrance to Memorial Amphitheater at Arlington National Cemetery in Arlington, Virginia. The inscription reads: "Dulce et decorum est pro patria mori".

Dulce et decōrum est prō patriā morī (Note: Classical Latin pronunciation: [ˈdʊɫkɛ ɛt dɛˈkoːrũː ˈɛst proː ˈpatriaː ˈmɔriː], Ecclesiastical Latin pronunciation: [ˈdultʃe et deˈkorum ˈest pro ˈpatria ˈmori].) is a line from the Odes (III.2.13) by the Roman lyric poet Horace. The line translates: "It is sweet and proper to die for one's country." The Latin word patria (homeland), literally meaning the country of one's fathers (in Latin, patres) or ancestors, is the source of the French word for a country, patrie, and of the English word "patriot" (one who loves their country).

Horace's line was quoted in the title of a poem by Wilfred Owen, "Dulce et Decorum est", published in 1920, describing soldiers' horrific experiences in World War I. Owen's poem, which calls Horace's line "the old Lie", essentially ended the line's straightforward uncritical use.

== Context ==
The poem from which the line comes, exhorts Roman citizens to develop martial prowess such that the enemies of Rome, in particular the Parthians, will be too terrified to resist the Romans. In John Conington's translation, the relevant passage reads:

Angustam amice pauperiem pati
robustus acri militia puer
condiscat et Parthos ferocis
vexet eques metuendus hasta
vitamque sub divo et trepidis agat
in rebus. Illum ex moenibus hosticis
matrona bellantis tyranni
prospiciens et adulta virgo
suspiret, eheu, ne rudis agminum
sponsus lacessat regius asperum
tactu leonem, quem cruenta
per medias rapit ira caedes.
Dulce et decorum est pro patria mori:
mors et fugacem persequitur virum
nec parcit inbellis iuventae
poplitibus timidove tergo.

To suffer hardness with good cheer,
In sternest school of warfare bred,
Our youth should learn; let steed and spear
Make him one day the Parthian's dread;
Cold skies, keen perils, brace his life.
Methinks I see from rampired town
Some battling tyrant's matron wife,
Some maiden, look in terror down,—
"Ah, my dear lord, untrain'd in war!
O tempt not the infuriate mood
Of that fell lion I see! from far
He plunges through a tide of blood!"
What joy, to die for fatherland !
Death's darts e'en flying feet o'ertake,
Nor spare a recreant chivalry,
A back that cowers, or loins that quake.

A humorous elaboration of the original line was used as a toast in the 19th century: Dulce et decorum est pro patria mori, sed dulcius pro patria vivere, et dulcissimum pro patria bibere. Ergo, bibamus pro salute patriae (English: "It is sweet and fitting to die for the homeland, but sweeter still to live for the homeland, and sweetest yet to drink for the homeland. So, let us drink to the health of the homeland").

== Uses in art and literature ==
Dulce et Decorum est

...
If you could hear, at every jolt, the blood
Come gargling from the froth-corrupted lungs,
Obscene as cancer,
Bitter as the cud
Of vile, incurable sores on innocent tongues,–
My friend, you would not tell with such high zest
To children ardent for some desperate glory,
The old Lie: Dulce et decorum est
Pro patria mori.

— Wilfred Owen
- Perhaps the most famous modern use of the phrase is as the title of a poem, "Dulce et Decorum est", by British poet Wilfred Owen during World War I. Owen's poem describes a gas attack during World War I and is one of his many anti-war poems that were not published until after the war ended. In the final lines of the poem, the Horatian phrase is described as "the old lie". It is believed, and illustrated by the original copy of the poem, that Owen intended to dedicate the poem ironically to Jessie Pope, a popular writer who glorified the war and recruited "laddies" who "longed to charge and shoot" in simplistically patriotic poems like "The Call".
- "Died some, pro patria, non 'dulce' non 'et decor' ..." from part IV of Ezra Pound's "Hugh Selwyn Mauberley", a damning indictment of World War I; "Daring as never before, wastage as never before."
- In a 1915 school essay, German playwright Bertolt Brecht referred to the phrase as Zweckpropaganda (cheap propaganda for a specific cause) and pointed out that "It is sweeter and more fitting to live for one's country", an essay for which he was nearly expelled.
- The title of Damon Knight's 1955 short story "Dulcie and Decorum" is an ironic play on the first three words of the phrase; the story is about computers that induce humans to kill themselves.
- The 1971 film Johnny Got His Gun ends with this saying, along with casualty statistics since World War I.
- In the film All Quiet on the Western Front (1930), a teacher quotes this early on while talking to his class.
- In his book And No Birds Sang, chronicling his service in Italy with the Canadian army during World War II, Farley Mowat quotes Wilfred Owen's poem on the opening pages and addresses "the Old Lie" in the final section of the book.
- Tim O'Brien quotes the line in the book If I Die in a Combat Zone, Box Me Up and Ship Me Home.
- In Margaret Mitchell's Gone with the Wind (1936), the Tarleton brothers are buried under a tombstone which bears the phrase.
- The last words attributed to the Israeli national hero Yosef Trumpeldor – "It is good to die for our country" (טוב למות בעד ארצנו) – are considered to be derived from Horace's, and were a frequently used Zionist slogan in the early 20th century.
- In William Makepeace Thackeray's novel Vanity Fair, the quote appears on George Osborne's tombstone after he dies at Waterloo.
- In Thomas Wolfe's Look Homeward, Angel: A Story of the Buried Life, after the outbreak of World War I, adolescent Eugene, encouraged by his teacher, Margaret Leonard, devours stories of wartime courage (Rupert Brooke's "If I Should die ..." and R. Hankey's A Student in Arms), and fueled by these stories, composes his own, to the ever-present literary-referenced commentary by Wolfe.
- Karl Marlantes' 2009 novel Matterhorn: A Novel of the Vietnam War features a mock-mass between Mellas and others, in which the line is satirically quoted.
- The British rock band Kasabian includes the phrase at the end of the music video for their song "Empire".
- The British rock band The Damned released a single named "In Dulce Decorum" in 1987.
- The song The Latin One by 10,000 Maniacs sets the poem by Owen to music and includes the phrase.
- American band Kamelot quotes the line in the song "Memento Mori", from their seventh album, The Black Halo.
- Scottish rock band The Skids include a song named "Dulce Et Decorum Est (Pro Patria Mori)" on the album Days in Europa in 1979.
- British folk-metal band Skyclad uses the quote in the song "Jeopardy", in their album The Silent Whales of Lunar Sea.
- American band Globus included the phrase in the lyrics of "In Memoriam", from their album Break From This World, released in 2011.
- The British dark cabaret act The Tiger Lillies included a song called "Dulce et Decorum Est" on the album A Dream Turns Sour from 2014. This is a reading of the Wilfred Owen poem with music written by Martyn Jacques.
- In Kenneth Branagh's film version of Mozart's The Magic Flute, Sarastro's palace has the quote engraved across its entrance.
- The line is quoted in the 1966 movie Modesty Blaise, after a plane is apparently shot down.
- The line appears as a Morse coded message as part of a puzzle in the 2016 videogame Battlefield 1.
- In "A Drinking Song" from The Divine Comedy's album Promenade, the subject declares "Heaven be thanked we live in an age where no man need bother except on the stage with 'Dolce et decorum est pro patria mori'".
- In the 2021 movie The King's Man, the verse is cited twice: first during a mass for soldiers going to war (although not many of them understand what the priest says), and again during Conrad's funeral.

== Use as a motto and inscription ==
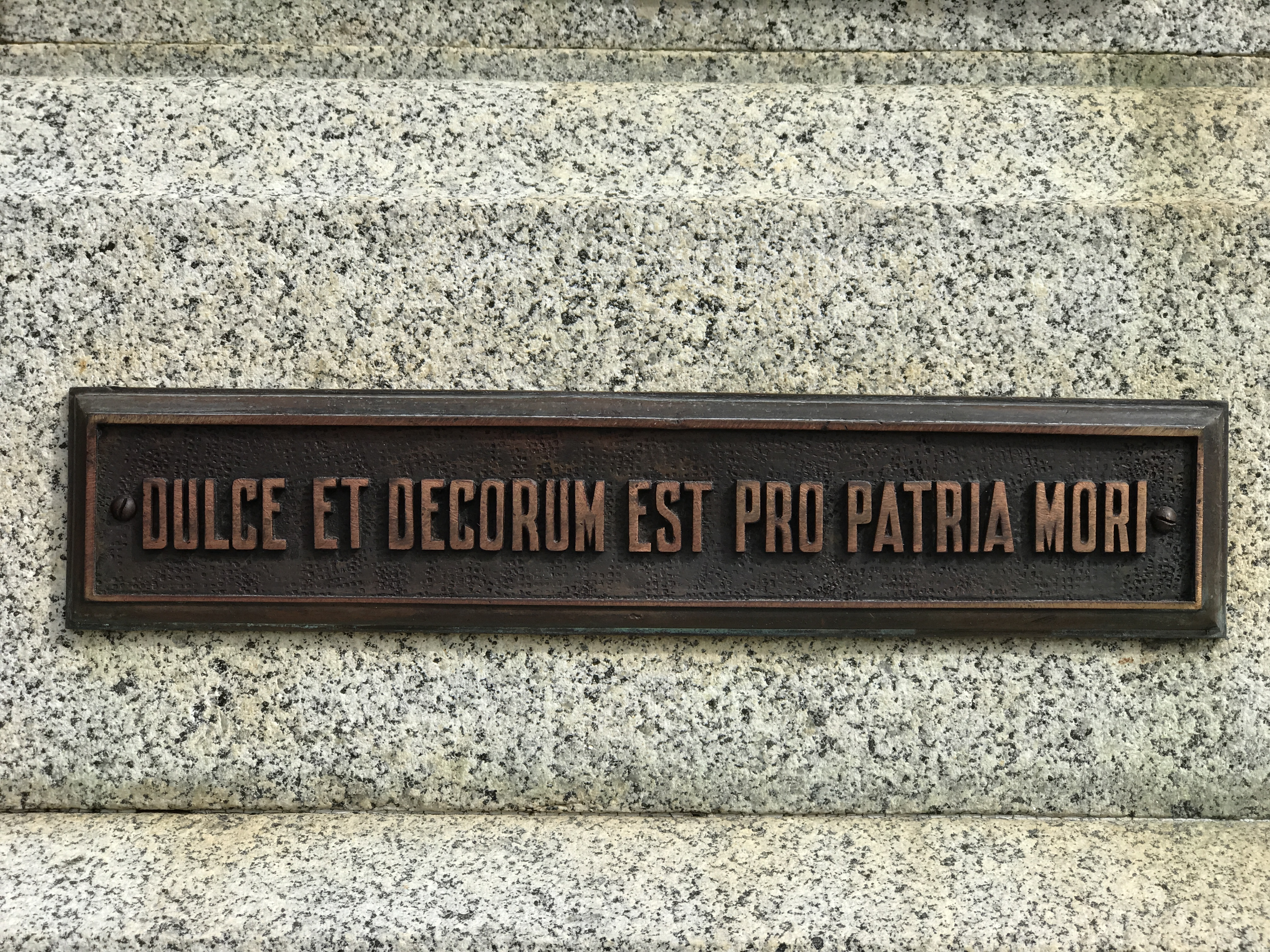
Plaque at the war memorial in Graceville, Queensland, Australia

Australia
The phrase appears prominently on a plaque at AMA House, Sydney commemorating fallen members of the New South Wales branch of the British Medical Association.
The phrase can be found at the Graceville War Memorial, Graceville, Queensland.
Brazil
The phrase can be found at the Monument to the Expeditionary (Monumento ao Expedicionário) in Alegrete city, state of Rio Grande do Sul.

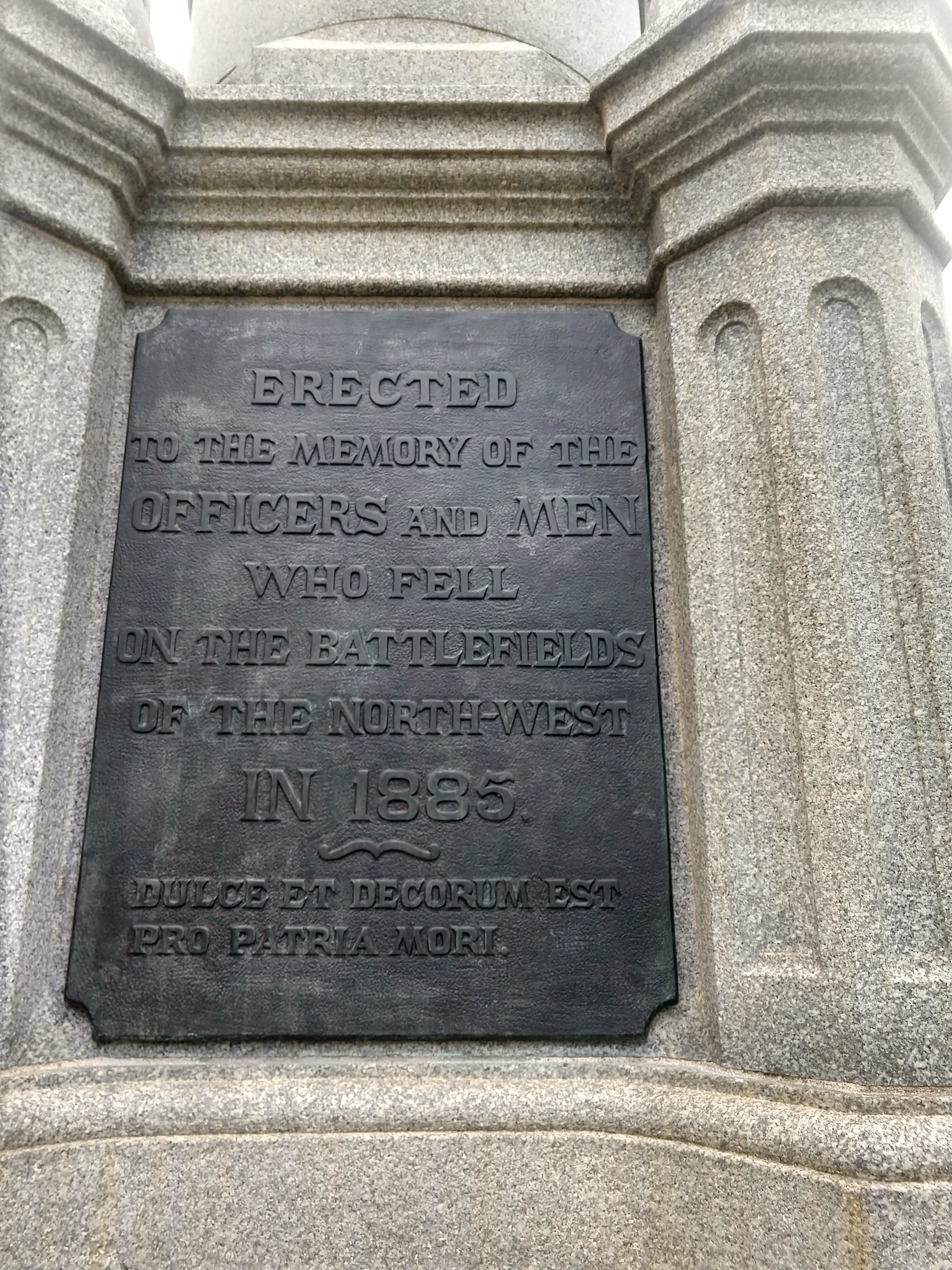
Plaque at Queen's Park in Toronto dedicated to the militia that put down the North-West Rebellion

Canada
Queen's Park in Toronto includes a monument to the militia members who died putting down the North-West Rebellion with the phrase.
The phrase appears on a bronze plaque bearing the names of Canadian soldiers lost from the city of Calgary during World War I and World War II at Central Memorial High School's front entrance.
The phrase is found on the Great War cenotaph in Phoenix, British Columbia
Cuba
The phrase was prominently inscribed in a large bronze tablet commemorating Cuban patriot Calixto García, Major-General of the Spanish–American War. The tablet was erected by the Freemasons where he died at the Raleigh Hotel in Washington, D.C. Today, this tablet resides at the private residence of one of García's direct descendants.
Dominican Republic
The phrase is inscribed in bronze letters above the arch of the Puerta del Conde in Santo Domingo, Dominican Republic.
Finland

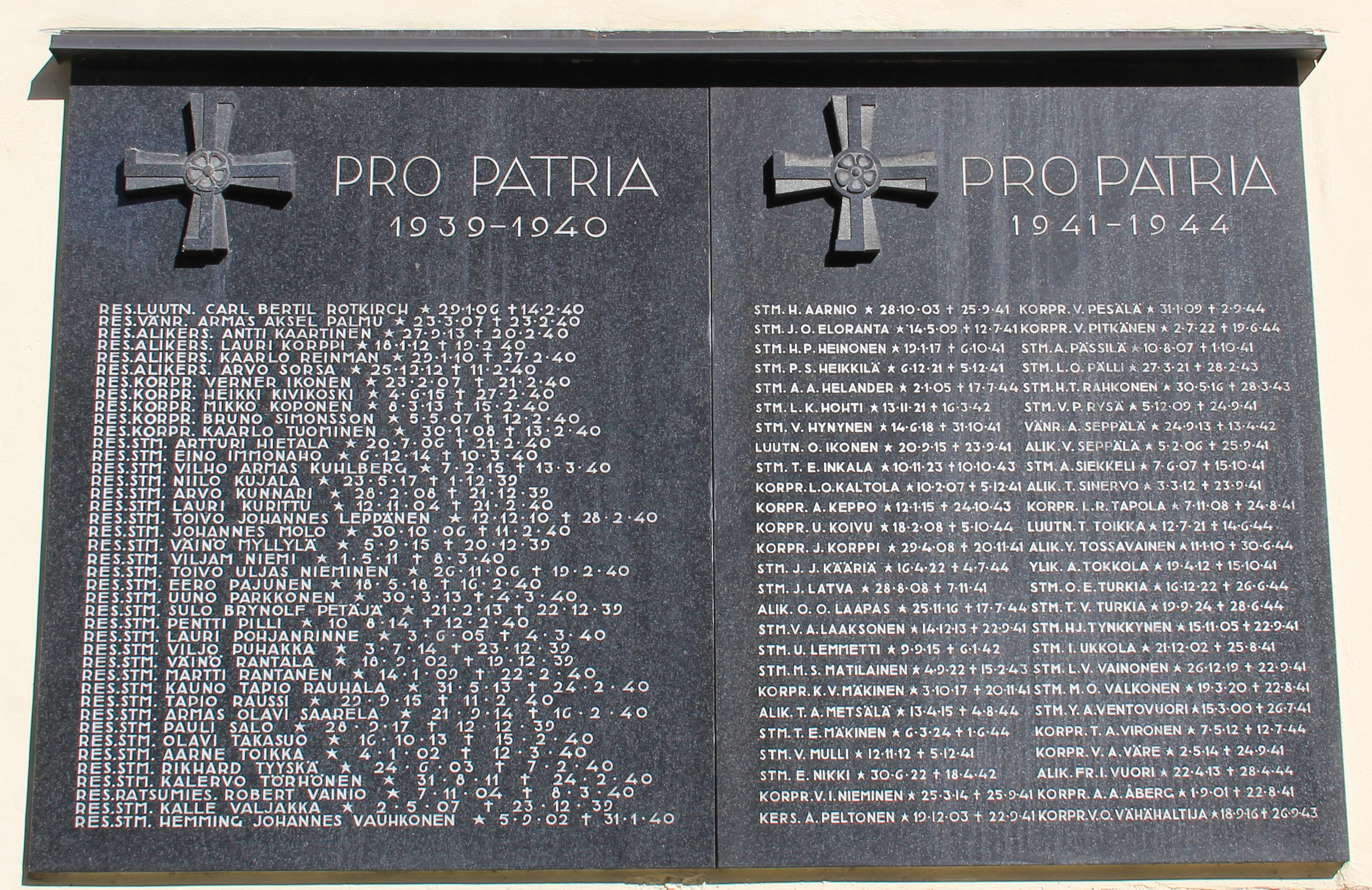
Plaque at the Inkeroinen (Kouvola) church in Kouvola, Finland, in honour of the fallen of the Continuation War (1941–1945), adorned with crosses of liberty.

The phrase is commonly inscribed on stone plaques in public spaces, often school and graveyards, but also churches, factories, and libraries. The plaques list local soldiers that fought and died in the Finnish War of 1918, the Winter War, the Continuation War, the Lapland War or, less often, the wars of the 1920s.
India
Found on the inscription on the French Monument in Shillong, Meghalaya for the soldiers of the 26th Khasi Labour Corps who died during World War I (1917–1918).
The inscription is also seen on the rear-quarter of the Memorial Tablet in the front garden of St Joseph's Boys' High School, Bangalore in memory of the Old Boys of the school who died in the Great War (1914–1918). A statue of Saint Joseph with Infant Jesus now stands upon the tablet.
Italy
The verse is engraved in each medallion in the center of the crosses of Aquileia's Cemetery of the Heroes, dedicated to every soldier who died during the First World War. This is the place from which, in October 1921, the Unknown Soldier departed in the direction of the Altare della Patria in Rome.
Nepal
The phrase was the national motto of Nepal from 1932 to 1962 along with Janani Janmabhumishcha Swargadapi Gariyasi, before being removed, and completely replaced by the latter.
New Zealand
The phrase is found on the memorial archway at the entrance of Otago Boys' High School in Dunedin.
Pakistan
The phrase is written on a plaque on the left wall of main entrance of the Patiala Block, King Edward Medical University, Lahore. It commemorates the students and graduates of the institution who died in the First World War.
Spain
The phrase is scribed on the tomb of Major William Martin, a fictional Royal Marine officer whose death was concocted as part of Operation Mincemeat, in the cemetery of Nuestra Señora in Huelva.
Sweden
The phrase can be found inscribed on the outer wall of an old war fort within the Friseboda nature reserve in Sweden.

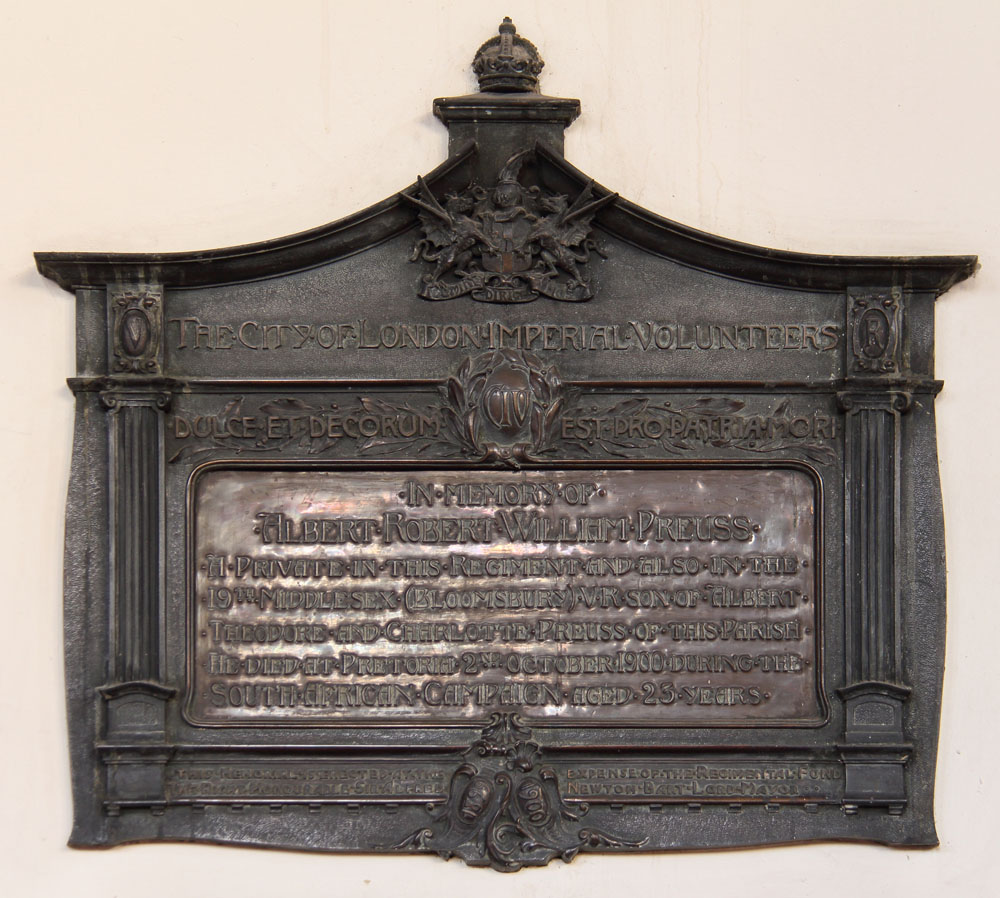

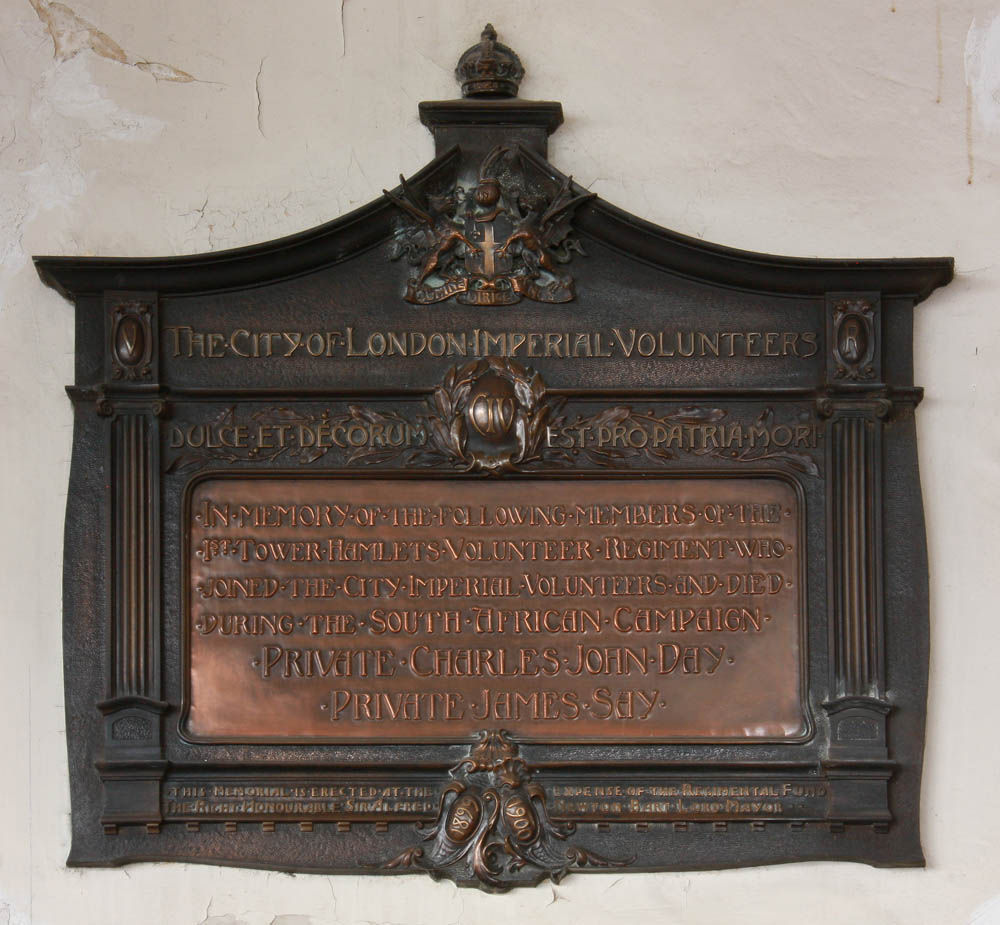
Boer War memorials at St George the Martyr, Holborn (top) and St Leonard's, Shoreditch (above)

United Kingdom
The phrase was inscribed on the wall of the chapel of the Royal Military Academy Sandhurst in 1913.
It is inscribed on the Parish Roll of Honour for Devoran in Cornwall, hanging in the Village Hall.
It is also inscribed on Second Boer War memorial tablets in three London churches: St George the Martyr, Holborn; St John the Evangelist, Upper Holloway; and St Leonard's, Shoreditch.
United States
The phrase can be found at the front entrance to the Arlington Memorial Amphitheater at the Arlington National Cemetery, which was constructed from 1915 to 1920 – just before Owen's poem was published.
The phrase is carved in the monument commemorating the Battle of Wyoming (Pennsylvania), also known as the Wyoming Massacre, 3 July 1778, erected 3 July 1878.
The phrase is located on the second monument of the Point Lookout Confederate Cemetery in Point Lookout, Maryland, and at the Confederate Cemetery in the Manassas National Battlefield Park.
The phrase can be found inscribed on the Civil War Monument at Millersville University in Millersville, Pennsylvania, erected in 1872.

=== Organizations ===
Dulce et decorum est pro patria mori is the motto of the following organizations:

- The Portuguese Military Academy (Academia Militar)
- The 103rd Ground Reconnaissance Squadron of the Royal Netherlands Army
- The 10/27 Royal South Australian Regiment of the Royal Australian Infantry Corps adopted Pro Patria derived from the above line meaning "For One's Country" as their unit motto.

The shorter phrase Pro Patria ("for the homeland") may or may be not related to the Horace quote:

- Pro Patria is the motto of the Higgins or O'Huigan clan.
- It is the motto of the Sri Lanka Army as well as being inscribed on the collar insignia of the Royal Canadian Regiment.
- Pro Patria is the name of a neighborhood in Caracas, Venezuela.

== See also ==
- Tellus of Athens
