= Wartau =

- Municipality
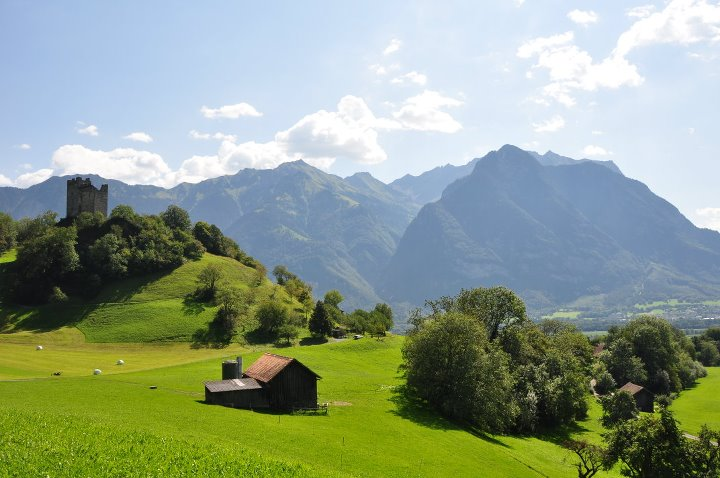
- View of the ruined Wartau castle, looking south-east across the Rhine Valley towards Mittagspitz

- Coat of arms
- Location of Wartau
- Location within Switzerland Location within Canton of St. Gallen
- Coordinates: 47°5′N 9°29′E
- Country: Switzerland
- Canton: St. Gallen
- District: Werdenberg

Government
  - Mayor: Andreas Bernold

Area
  - Total: 41.74 km^{2} (16.12 sq mi)
- Elevation: 468 m (1,535 ft)

Population (December 2020)
  - Total: 5,296
  - Density: 126.9/km^{2} (328.6/sq mi)
- Time zone: UTC+01:00 (CET)
  - Summer (DST): UTC+02:00 (CEST)
- Postal code: 9476-9479
- SFOS number: 3276
- ISO 3166 code: CH-SG
- Surrounded by: Balzers (LI), Flums, Mels, Sargans, Sevelen, Triesen (LI), Walenstadt
- Website: www.wartau.ch

Wartau is a municipality in the Werdenberg constituency of the Swiss canton of St. Gallen. The municipality consists of a number of villages on the eastern flank of the Alvier group, along the left shore of the Alpine Rhine.

== Geography ==
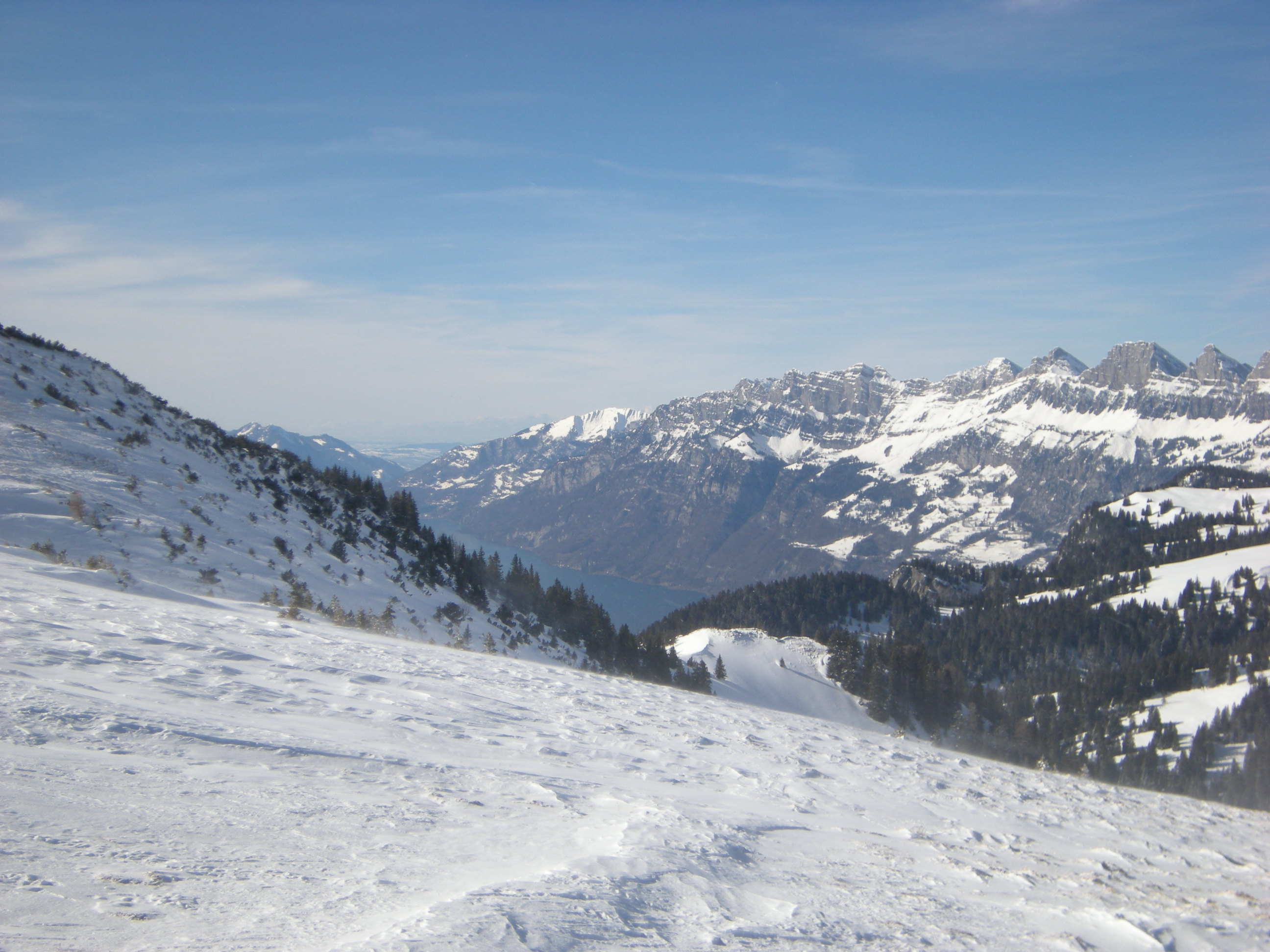
View from Chamm, the ridge between Palfris and Tschggen alps (1,710 m, 5,610 ft), looking west-northwest towards Walensee.

Wartau municipality consists of the villages of Azmoos (482 m, 1,581 ft), Trübbach (478 m, 1,568 ft), Weite (469 m, 1,539 ft) along the Rhine, Oberschan (668 m, 2,192 ft), Malans (617 m, 2,024 ft), Gretschins (600 m, 2,000 ft) and Fontnas (542 m, 1,778 ft) in the foothills of the Alvier chain, the hamlets of Plattis (464 m, 1,522 ft) and Murris (470 m, 1,540 ft), and Matug (731 m, 2,398 ft) and environs, historically a Walser Streusiedlung.

Wartau has an area, (as of the 2004/09 survey) of 41.75 km^{2} (16.12 sq mi). Of this area, about 45.8% is used for agricultural purposes, while 38.4% is forested. Of the rest of the land, 6.8% is settled (buildings or roads) and 9.0% is unproductive land. In the 2004/09 survey a total of 171 ha (420 acres) or about 4.1% of the total area was covered with buildings, an increase of 46 ha (110 acres) over the 1984 amount. About 0.19% of the total area is recreational space. Of the agricultural land, 26 ha (64 acres) is used for orchards and vineyards, 892 ha (2,200 acres) is fields and grasslands and 1,232 ha (3,040 acres) consists of alpine grazing areas. Since 1984 the amount of agricultural land has decreased by 85 ha (210 acres). Over the same time period the amount of forested land has increased by 56 ha (140 acres). Rivers and lakes cover 104 ha (260 acres) in the municipality.

The highest point of the municipality is Alvier peak, at 2,343 m (7,687 ft), the lowest point is the Rhine Valley at 461 m (1,512 ft).

== Demographics ==
Wartau has a population (as of December 2020) of 5,296. As of 2015, 28.6% of the population are resident foreign nationals. In 2015 a small minority (321 or 6.1% of the population) was born in Germany a small minority (273 or 5.2% of the population) was born in Italy. Over the last 5 years (2010-2015) the population has changed at a rate of 3.73%. The birth rate in the municipality, in 2015, was 10.5, while the death rate was 8.6 per thousand residents.

As of 2015, children and teenagers (0–19 years old) make up 22.5% of the population, while adults (20–64 years old) are 61.1% of the population and seniors (over 64 years old) make up 16.4%. In 2015 there were 2,179 single residents, 2,443 people who were married or in a civil partnership, 243 widows or widowers and 366 divorced residents.

In 2015 there were 2,176 private households in Wartau with an average household size of 2.38 persons. In 2015 about 67.1% of all buildings in the municipality were single family homes, which is greater than the percentage in the canton (60.5%) and greater than the percentage nationally (57.4%). Of the 1,446 inhabited buildings in the municipality, in 2000, about 69.3% were single family homes and 14.2% were multiple family buildings. Additionally, about 29.6% of the buildings were built before 1919, while 11.0% were built between 1991 and 2000. In 2014 the rate of construction of new housing units per 1000 residents was 7.66. The vacancy rate for the municipality, in 2016, was 0.82%.

As of 2007, about 23.3% of the population was made up of foreign nationals. Of the foreign population, (as of 2000), 84 are from Germany, 176 are from Italy, 424 are from ex-Yugoslavia, 53 are from Austria, 25 are from Turkey, and 155 are from another country. Most of the population (as of 2000) speaks German (88.5%), with Albanian being second most common (3.2%) and Italian being third (2.9%). Of the Swiss national languages (as of 2000), 4,161 speak German, 9 people speak French, 135 people speak Italian, and 11 people speak Romansh.

The historical population is given in the following chart:

== History ==
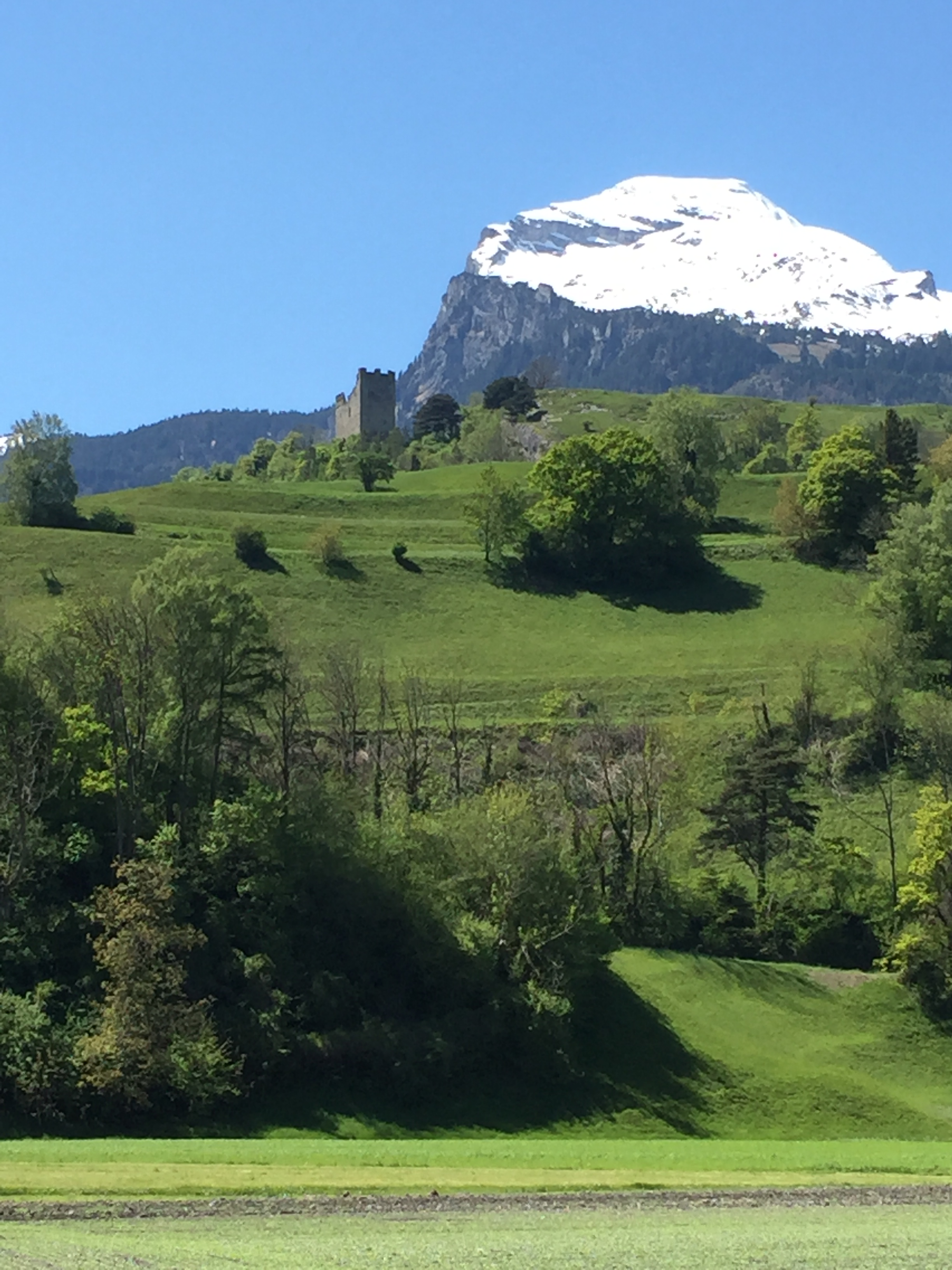
Wartau Castle from the B13 road south of Sevelen, Canton Graubünden

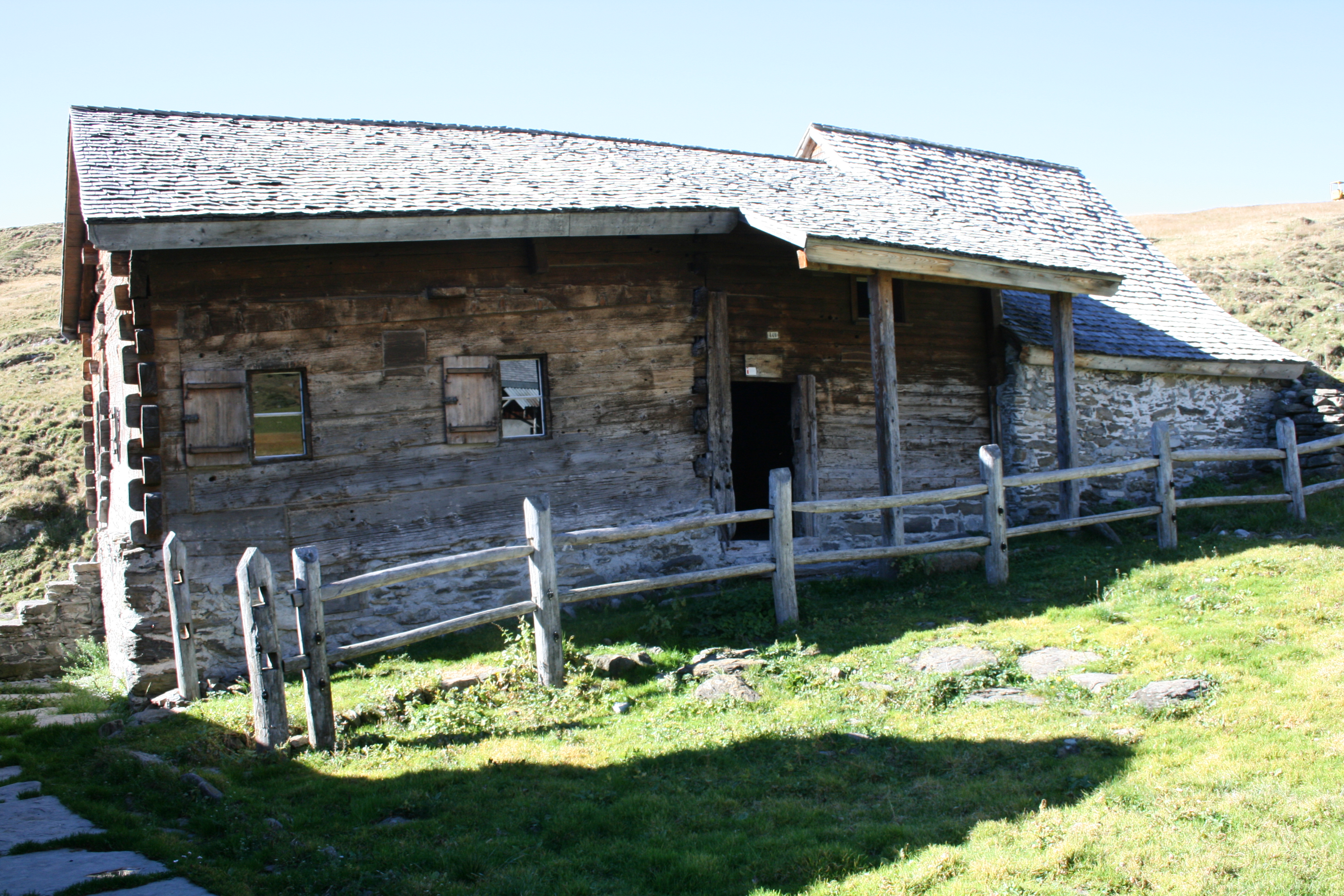
Walser Rathaus, Palfries

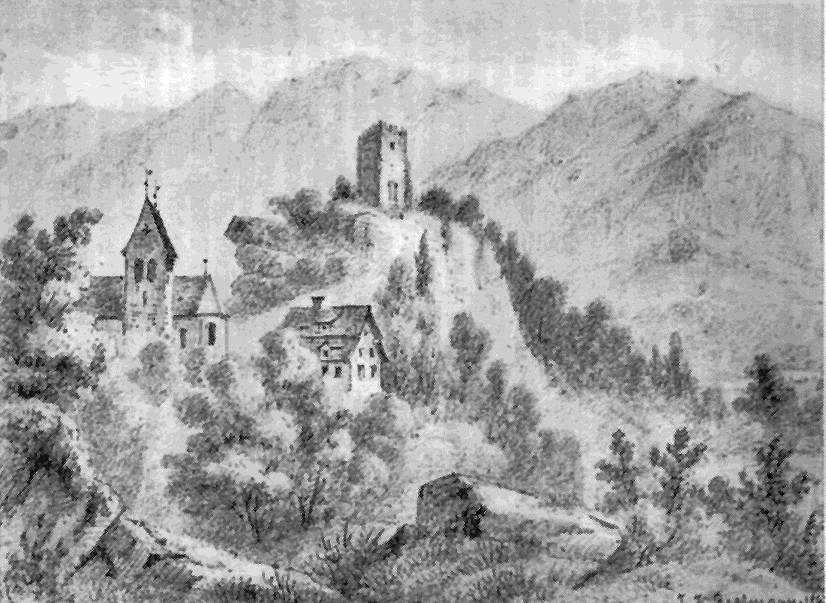
View of Gretschins church with Wartau castle in the background, drawing by Johann Jakob Rietmann (1808–1868)

Aerial view (1964)

There are a number of Mesolithic, Neolithic and Bronze Age traces, as well traces of an early medieval estate. The name Wartau is taken from that of Wartau Castle, built in 1225 (overlooking Gretschins). The center of the medieval manor was at Gretschins, with a church first mentioned in 1273.

The lordship of Wartau passed to the counts of Werdenberg-Heiligenberg in 1399, and further to Lucerne in 1485 and to Glarus in 1517. In the 14th century, the higher parts of the territory of the modern municipality (Matug, Walserberg, Palfris) were settled by Walser. High justice lay with the county of Sargans from 1483 until 1798. There was a Rhine ferry between Trübbach and Balzers in the medieval period. The Swiss Confederacy constructed a road along the Rhine to Sargans in 1491/2.

The church at Gretschins was dedicated to Saint Martin in 1494, but the parish adopted the Swiss Reformation at an early time, in the 1520s. Attempts to re-introduced the Catholic mass in 1694/4 resulted in the "Wartau conflict" (Wartauerhandel), which almost triggered a larger religious war in the Swiss Confederacy. A second church was built in Azmoos in 1736.

The municipal coat of arms is attested on a stained glass panel dated 1632. It shows a grapevine below a gold star in a red field (Gules a Vine Stump Vert leaved issuant from Coupeaux of the same and in chief a Mullet Or). An unrelated municipal coat of arms, showing the castle ruins, was designed in 1939. This was replaced in favour of the historical coat of arms in the 1970s.

In 1802, a short-lived "Republic of Wartau" was proclaimed, before the modern municipality was formed as part of the Swiss canton of St. Gallen in 1803. The Walser population which now found itself on the territory of the municipality was naturalized only in 1827, under pressure from the cantonal authorities. Railway stations at Trübbach and Weite were built in 1858. The Rhine ferry was replaced by a bridge in 1872. The A13 motorway dates to 1967.

The prehistoric settlement and sacrifice site at Gretschins-Herrenfeld and Ochsenberg, as well as the nearby medieval castle ruins and the Walser Rathaus (the town hall) auf Palfries are listed as Swiss heritage sites of national significance.

The villages of Azmoos and Oberschan as well as the hamlets of Fontnas and Gretschins are designated as part of the Inventory of Swiss Heritage Sites.

== Politics ==
In the 2015 federal election the most popular party was the SVP with 38.3% of the vote. The next three most popular parties were the FDP (21.3%), the SP (15.6%) and the CVP (7.5%). In the federal election, a total of 1,405 votes were cast, and the voter turnout was 46.3%.

In the 2007 federal election the most popular party was the SVP which received 42.3% of the vote. The next three most popular parties were the FDP (23.2%), the SP (15.7%) and the CVP (7.3%).

== Education ==
In Wartau about 70.2% of the population (between age 25–64) have completed either non-mandatory upper secondary education or additional higher education (either university or a Fachhochschule). Out of the total population in Wartau, as of 2000, the highest education level completed by 991 people (21.1% of the population) was Primary, while 1,759 (37.4%) have completed their secondary education, 440 (9.4%) have attended a Tertiary school, and 232 (4.9%) are not in school. The remainder did not answer this question.

== Economy ==
Wartau is an industrial community, a municipality where manufacturing provides over a quarter of all jobs.

As of 2014, there were a total of 1,886 people employed in the municipality. Of these, a total of 194 people worked in 49 businesses in the primary economic sector. There was one mid sized primary section business with a total of 71 employees. The secondary sector employed 771 workers in 67 separate businesses. Finally, the tertiary sector provided 921 jobs in 229 businesses.

In 2015 a total of 7.7% of the population received social assistance. In 2011 the unemployment rate in the municipality was 2%.

In 2015 local hotels had a total of 5,594 overnight stays, of which 13.4% were international visitors.

In 2015 the average cantonal, municipal and church tax rate in the municipality for a couple with two children making SFr 80,000 was 4.8% while the rate for a single person making SFr 150,000 was 19.4%. In 2013 the average income in the municipality per tax payer was SFr 66,142 and the per person average was SFr 26,799, which is less than the cantonal average of SFr 71,897 and SFr 30,336 and less than the national per tax payer average of SFr 82,682 and the per person average of SFr 35,825.

As of 2000 there were 1,017 residents who worked in the municipality, while 1,407 residents worked outside Wartau and 926 people commuted into the municipality for work.

== Religion ==
The parish of Gretschins was probably established in the early 13th century (first mention 1273). The church of Gretschins was rebuilt in 1494 and dedicated to Saint Martin. The Swiss Reformation was adopted still in the 1520s, and the population resisted attempts made by Glarus in the 17th century of re-introducing Roman Catholicism. Azmoos-Trübbach was established as a separate parish in 1743.

A Catholic church was built in Azmoos 1892, and Catholic population gradually increased, reaching parity by the later 20th century. As of the 2000 census, 42% of population were Catholic and 38% belonged to the Swiss Reformed Church. Wartau has received a significant immigrant population since the later 20th century, reflected by 7.8% (367 individuals) identifying as Muslim in the 2000 census. 5.5% (261 individuals) identified as non-religious (atheist or agnostic).

== Heritage sites of national significance ==
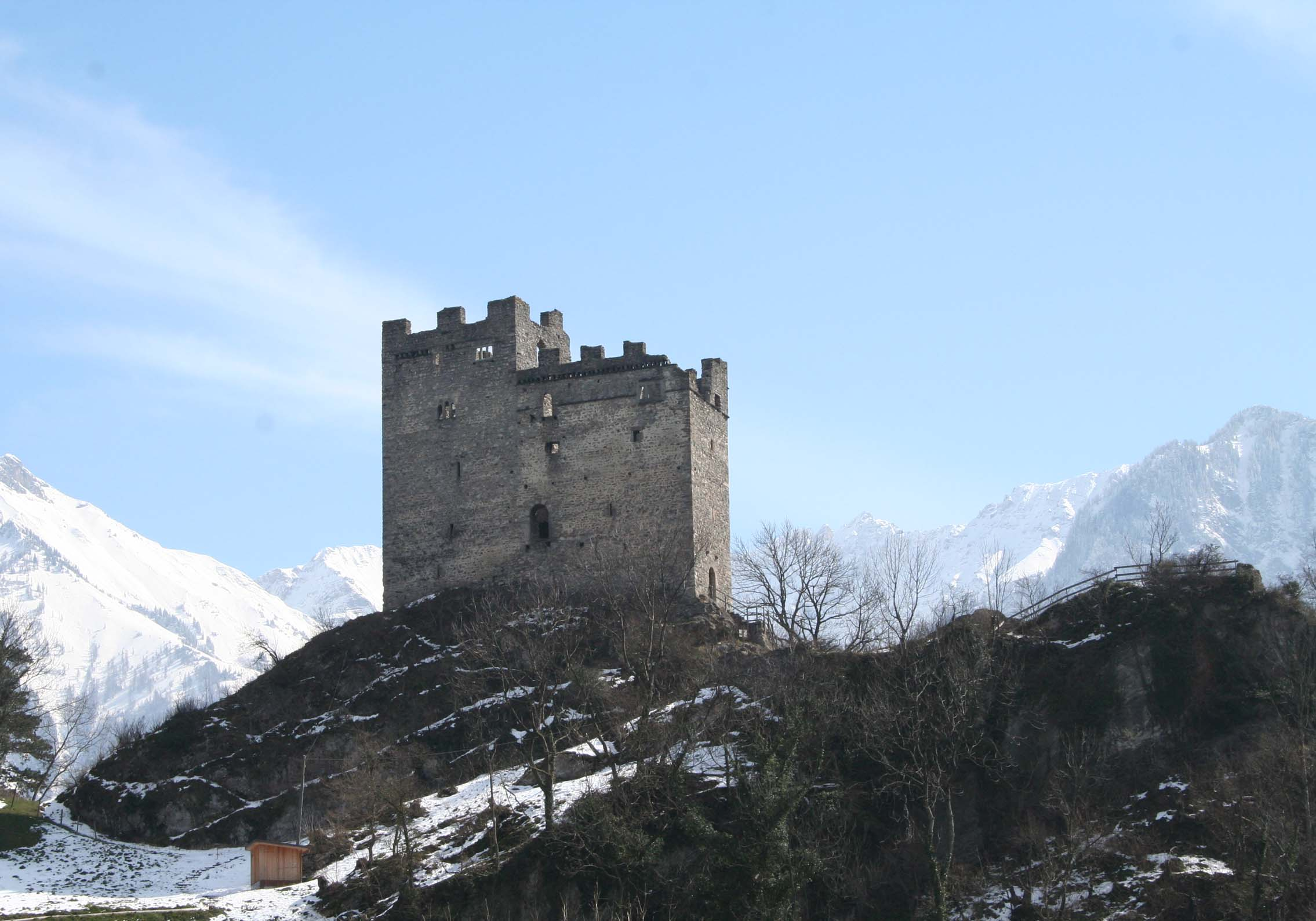
Wartau Castle

The Gretschins-Herrenfeld and Ochsenberg prehistoric settlement and sacrifice site as well as the ruins of Wartau Castle and the so-called Walser Rathaus (town council house) auf Palfries are listed as Swiss heritage sites of national significance. The villages of Azmoos and Oberschan and the hamlets of Fontnas and Gretschins are part of the Inventory of Swiss Heritage Sites.
