= Wartau Castle =

Castle in Switzerland

Wartau
- Wartau
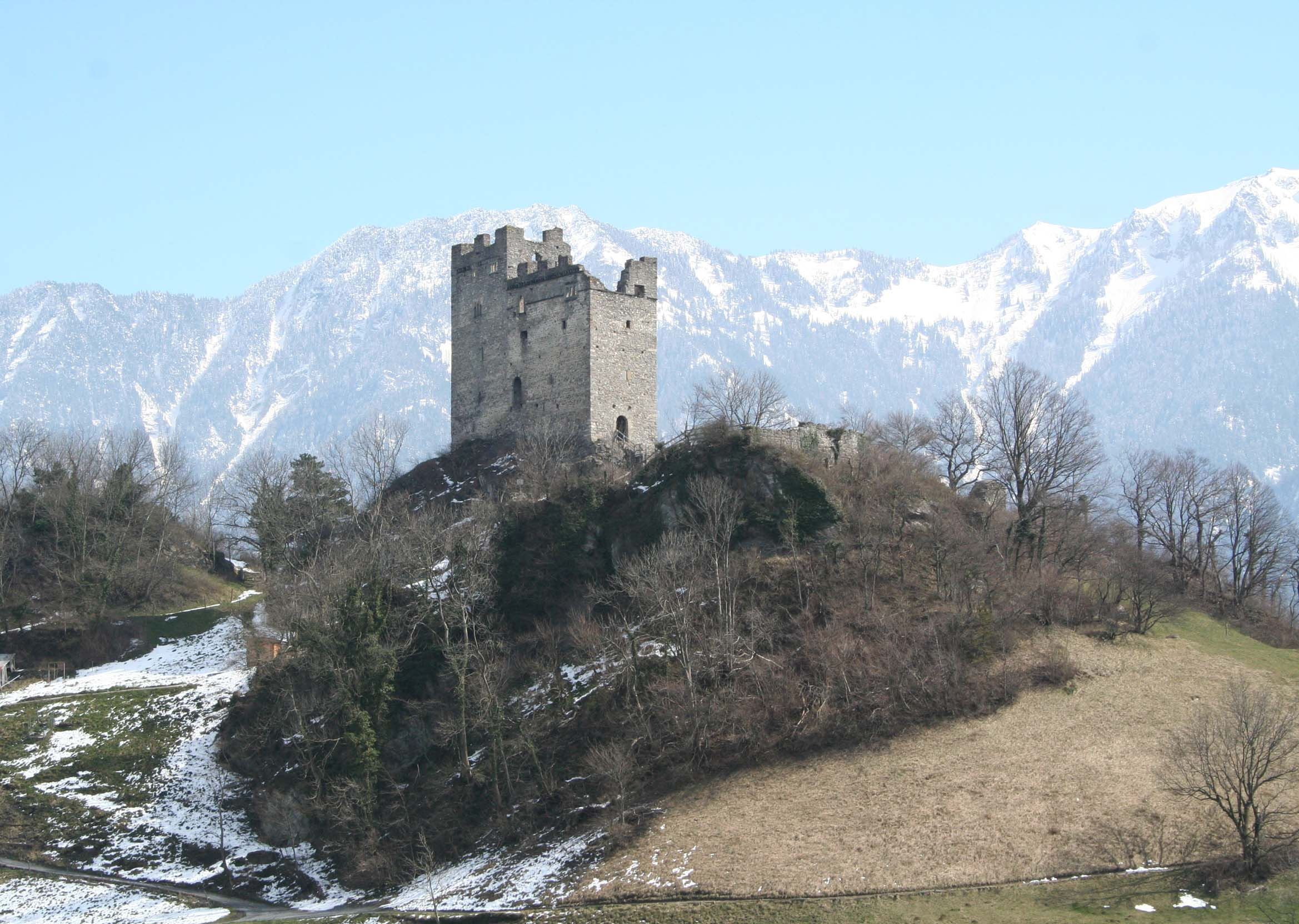
- Ruins of Wartau above Wartau

Site information
- Type: hill castle
- Code: CH-SG
- Condition: ruin

Location
- Location within Canton of St. Gallen Location within Switzerland
- Coordinates: 47°05′55.44″N 9°29′26.24″E
- Height: 650 m above the sea

Site history
- Built: about 1225
- Materials: Tuff blocks

Garrison information
- Occupants: Freiadelige

Wartau Castle is a ruined castle in the municipality of Wartau of the Canton of St. Gallen in Switzerland. It is a Swiss heritage site of national significance.

== History ==
The area around Wartau was first settled around 9,000 years ago, culminating in Neolithic settlements on the nearby Ochsenberg and Prochna Burg at about 3000 BC. A Merovingian fortress was built at Prochna Burg, but was destroyed around 750. While there are no written records that mention the first owner of the castle or when it was built, the wooden beams in the castle have been dated to about 1225. It was probably built as an administrative center for royal estates in the area. It may have been built by the Graubünden Freiherr von Sagogn, because around 1320 it was inherited by Count Hugo III von Werdenberg-Heiligenberg from the Freiherr von Wildenberg who was related to the Freiherr vonf Sagogn.

The castle first appears in the historical record in 1342 when Johannes von Belmont pledged it to his wife Adelheid von Klingen in exchange for 250 silver marks. In the following decades the Belmont family fought the Werdenberg-Heiligenbergs until the death of Ulrich Walter von Belmont in 1371 and the extinction of the Belmont family. The castle probably returned to the Werdenberg-Heiligenberg family and was occupied by their vassals for the next couple decades. Around 1390 the castle was owned by the related Werdenberg-Sargans. In 1393 as the two families fought for territory, the castle was besieged for eleven days. In 1399 it returned to the Counts of Werdenberg-Heiligenberg.

During the 14th century the castle was expanded several times, but by the 15th century it began to be neglected. In 1414 Count Rudolf II sold Wartau to his cousin Count Friedrich VII of Toggenburg, but six days later converted the sale into collateral for a loan. The Counts of Werdenberg-Heiligenberg died out in 1428, before they could redeem the loan. Eight years later Friedrich VII died, ending the Toggenburg line and starting the Old Zürich War over the Toggenburg inheritance. After the war it was inherited by the Freiherr von Thierstein, but after their extinction it passed through the von Limburg, Montfort-Tettnang and Sax-Misox families before it was sold in 1485 to the city of Lucerne. However, Wartau was too far from Lucerne and in 1493 they sold it to the Barons of Kastelwart. The Barons were faithful supporters of the Habsburgs, which caused conflicts with the villagers who supported the Swiss Confederation. In 1498 they sold the castle and lands to the Swabian von Hewen family. In the following year Matthias von Kastelwart died in the Battle of Dornach against the Swiss. In 1517 the Hewen family sold the castle and lands to the Canton of Glarus. However, the Glarus appointed Landvogt lived at Werdenberg Castle and so the castle at Wartau lost its administrative role and was abandoned around 1530.

Following the collapse of the Helvetic Republic and the creation of the Canton of St. Gallen in 1803, Wartau became part of the new Canton. The castle ruins were sold in 1818 to a private owner. It was donated to the municipality in 1911 and restored in 1932. In 1982 it was again repaired and restored, followed by a survey and excavations in 2002.

== Castle site ==
It was built atop a small tor or rock outcrop east of Gretschins hamlet. The castle consists of either two square towers built next to each other or a single rectangular tower which was divided into two. The north-eastern tower was about four stories tall, while the south-western tower was lower and divided into apartments. Around 1300 a crenellated parapet was added around the top of both towers. In the 14th century an additional story was added to the top of both towers along with new parapets and a flat roof. The new upper story is still visible as it was built from different stone. Around 1500 the upper story was rebuilt. The main tower is 22 meters (72 ft) tall with walls that are up to 1.75 m (5.7 ft) thick. Each story is about 4 m (13 ft) tall.

The castle is surrounded on three sides by a ring wall, which ran along a steep cliff.

== Gallery ==
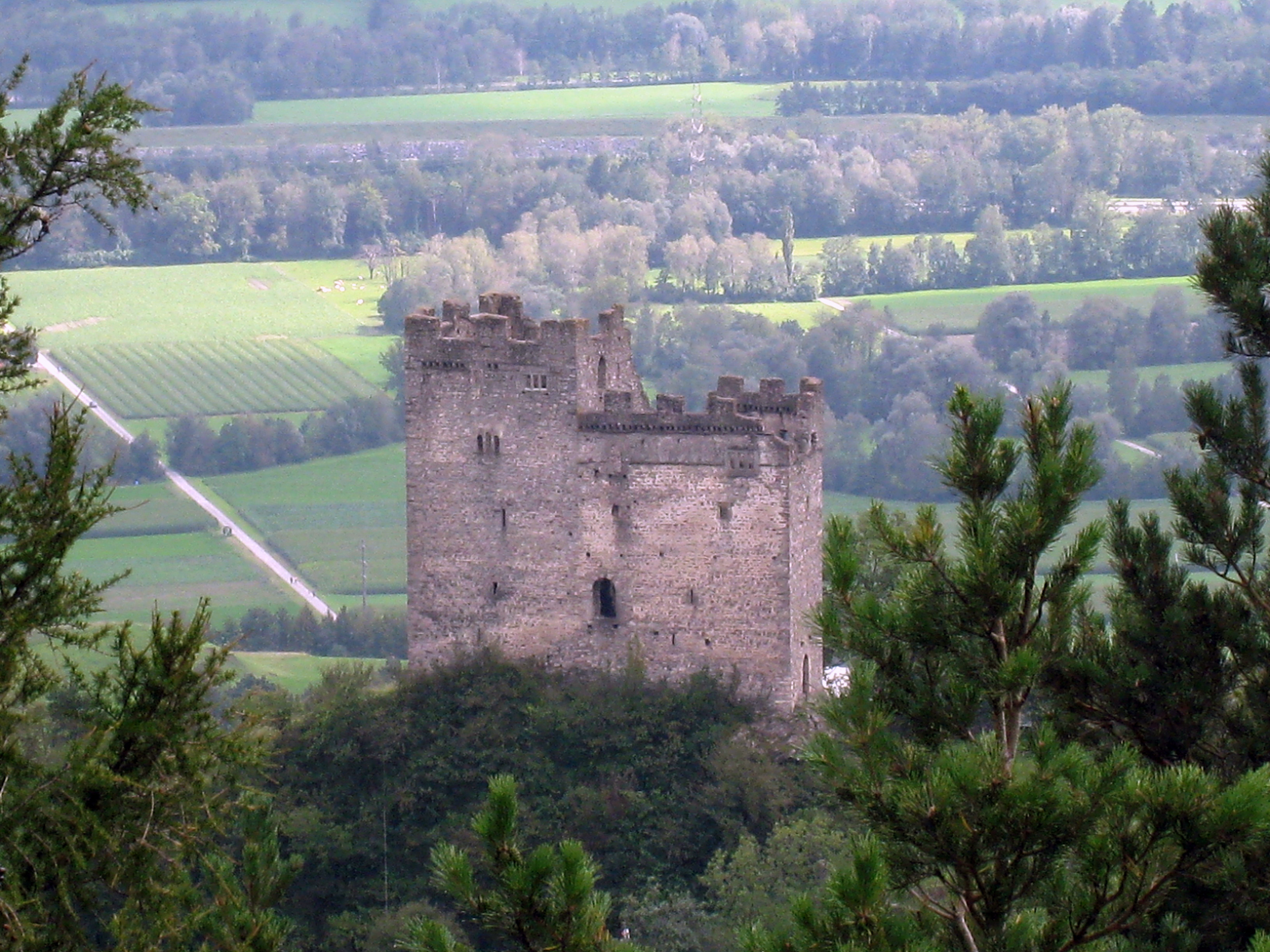
View of the castle from nearby Procha Castle

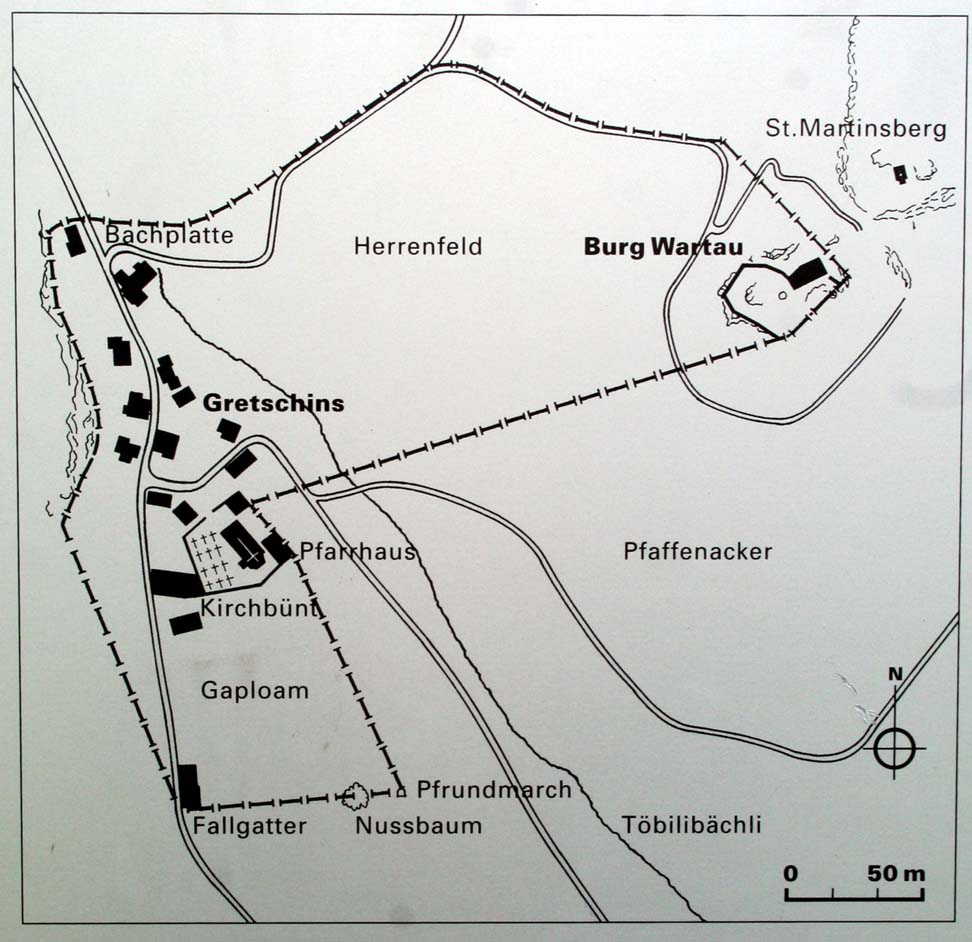
Reconstruction of the castle from between 1511 and 1752

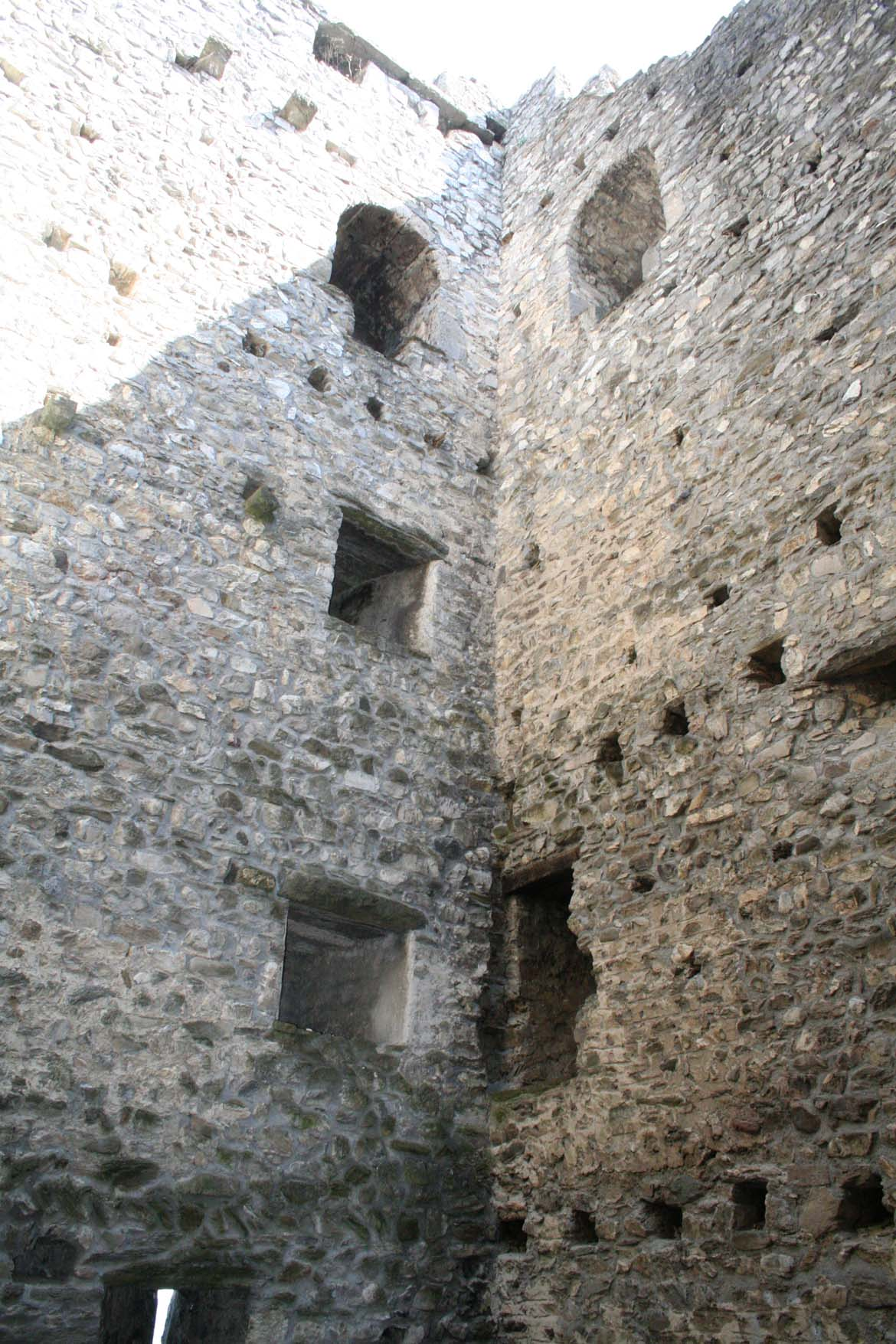
Interior of the tower with holes for the floors visible

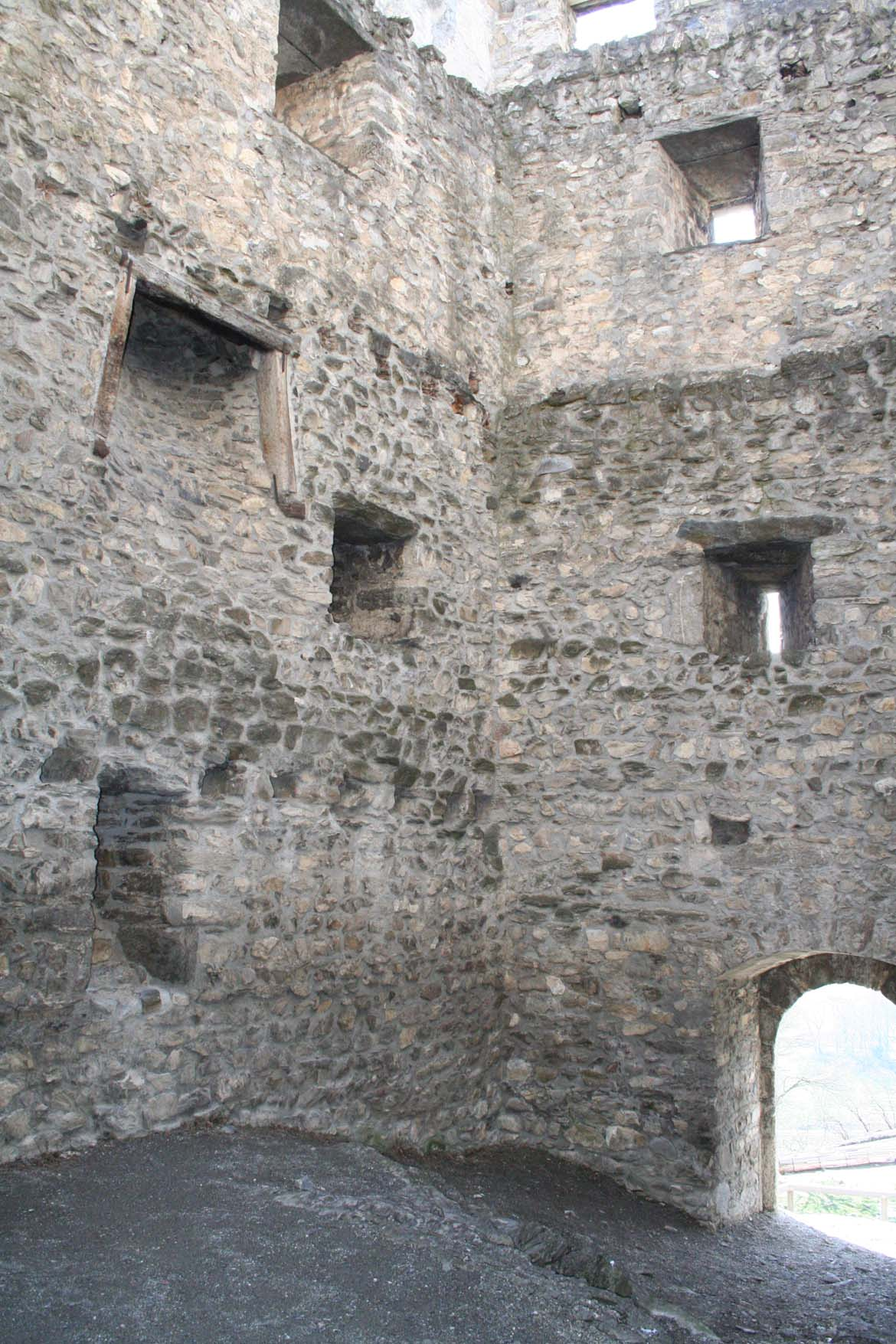
Interior of the tower, chimney visible on the left

== See also ==
- List of castles in Switzerland
