= Pro Patria Medal =

Pro Patria Medal may refer to:

- Pro Patria Medal (South Africa), a decoration of the South African Defence Force established in 1974
- Pro Patria Medal (Poland), a civil state decoration of Poland established in 2011
