= Swedish Royal Society Pro Patria =

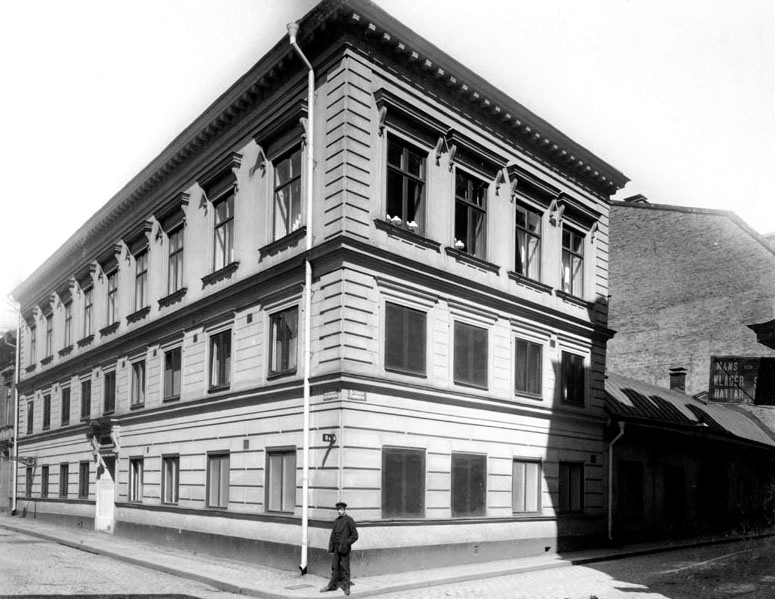
Building belonging to Pro Patria in Stockholm (1915).

The Swedish Royal Society Pro Patria (Swedish: Kungliga sällskapet Pro Patria) is a Swedish society and a charitable organisation founded in 1766, and a royal society under royal protection since 1775 (King Gustav III), with the purpose of making contributions to education and care of the needy, and by granting wearable medals with royal crown and portrait, rewarding socially beneficial activities as well as long and faithful service.

Since 1803, Pro Patria has royal authorisation to confer medals suspended from a royal crown with the obverse of the medal displaying the portrait of the current monarch of Sweden.
