= Walenstadt =

- Municipality
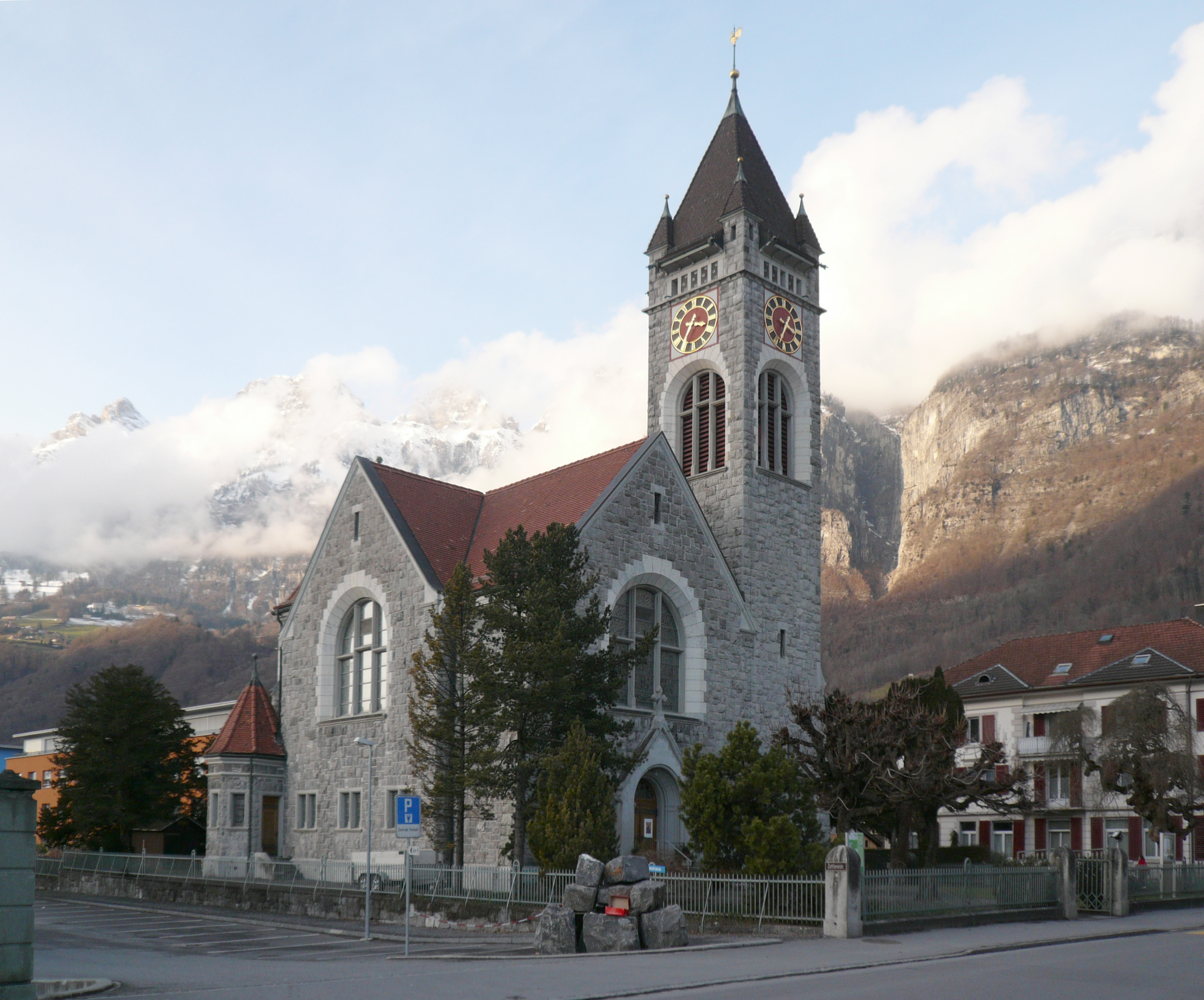
- Reformed Church of Walenstadt

- Flag Coat of arms
- Location of Walenstadt
- Location within Switzerland Location within Canton of St. Gallen
- Coordinates: 47°07′N 9°19′E
- Country: Switzerland
- Canton: St. Gallen
- District: Wahlkreis Sarganserland

Government
  - Mayor: Gemeindepräsident; Werner Schnider (as of 2008)

Area
  - Total: 45.75 km^{2} (17.66 sq mi)
- Elevation: 425 m (1,394 ft)

Population (December 2020)
  - Total: 5,728
  - Density: 125.2/km^{2} (324.3/sq mi)
- Time zone: UTC+01:00 (CET)
  - Summer (DST): UTC+02:00 (CEST)
- Postal code: 8880
- SFOS number: 3298
- ISO 3166 code: CH-SG
- Localities: Walenstadt, Walenstadtberg, Knoblisbühl, Berschis, Tscherlach
- Surrounded by: Alt Sankt Johann, Flums, Grabs, Quarten, Sevelen, Wartau
- Website: www.walenstadt.ch

Walenstadt is a municipality in the Wahlkreis (constituency) of Sarganserland in the canton of St. Gallen in Switzerland. It is located on Lake Walen (also known as "Lake Walenstadt").

== Geography ==
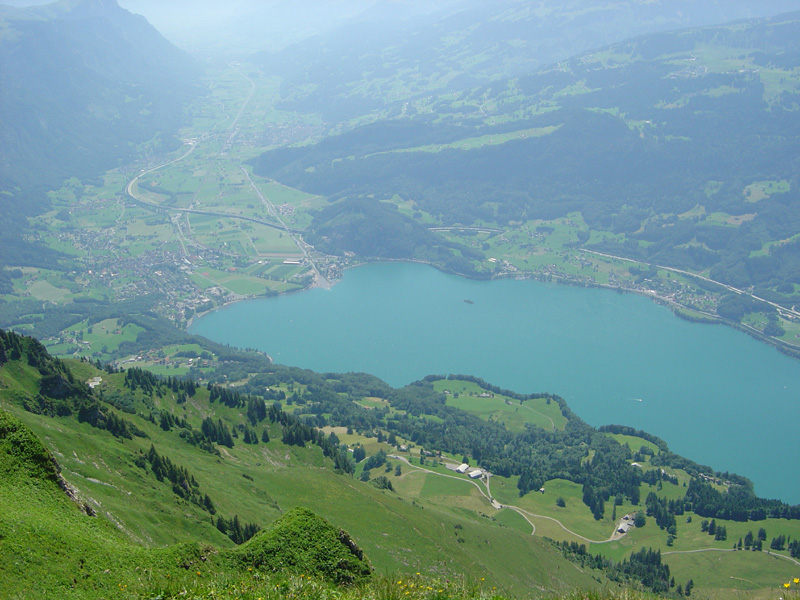
Walenstadt from above

Aerial view from 400 m by Walter Mittelholzer (1934)

Walenstadt has an area of 45.7 km^{2} (17.6 sq mi) as of 2006. Of this area, 35.1% is used for agricultural purposes, while 40.4% is forested. Of the rest of the land, 5.3% is settled (buildings or roads) and the remainder (19.2%) is non-productive (rivers or lakes). Until 1952, Walenstadt was known as Wallenstadt.

Lime glacial erratic show that the Seez valley (Seeztal) was 1000 m high covered with ice during the last ice age. As the ice began to melt, wild brooks arise. The south side from the Churfirsten falls almost vertical.

The community Walenstadt is divided in five towns: Walenstadt, Walenstadtberg, Knoblisbühl, Berschis and Tscherlach. In Walenstadtberg is a famous building: The Paxmal, built by Karl Bickel. All towns are linked by a public transport bus system. Walenstadt has a rail station.

== Coat of arms ==
The blazon of the municipal coat of arms is Azure a fortified civic gates Argent.

== Demographics ==
Walenstadt has a population (as of 31 December 2020) of 5,728. As of 2007, about 18.1% of the population was made up of foreign nationals. Of the foreign population, (as of 2000), 73 are from Germany, 148 are from Italy, 400 are from ex-Yugoslavia, 24 are from Austria, 95 are from Turkey, and 107 are from another country. Over the last 10 years the population has grown at a rate of 6.8%. Most of the population (as of 2000) speaks German (88.5%), with Albanian being second most common ( 2.9%) and Italian being third ( 2.4%). Of the Swiss national languages (as of 2000), 4,010 speak German, 22 people speak French, 110 people speak Italian, and 13 people speak Romansh.

The age distribution, as of 2000, in Walenstadt is; 579 children or 12.8% of the population are between 0 and 9 years old and 637 teenagers or 14.1% are between 10 and 19. Of the adult population, 523 people or 11.5% of the population are between 20 and 29 years old. 747 people or 16.5% are between 30 and 39, 642 people or 14.2% are between 40 and 49, and 545 people or 12.0% are between 50 and 59. The senior population distribution is 378 people or 8.3% of the population are between 60 and 69 years old, 315 people or 7.0% are between 70 and 79, there are 148 people or 3.3% who are between 80 and 89, and there are 18 people or 0.4% who are between 90 and 99.

In 2000, there were 558 persons (or 12.3% of the population) who were living alone in a private dwelling. There were 916 (or 20.2%) persons who were part of a couple (married or otherwise committed) without children, and 2,629 (or 58.0%) who were part of a couple with children. There were 227 (or 5.0%) people who lived in single parent home, while there are 27 persons who were adult children living with one or both parents, 6 persons who lived in a household made up of relatives, 30 who lived household made up of unrelated persons, and 139 who are either institutionalized or live in another type of collective housing.

In the 2007 federal election, the most popular party in Walenstadt was the Swiss People's Party, which received 37% of the vote. The next three most popular parties were the Christian Democratic Party (27.8%), the Social Democratic Party (13.1%) and the Free Democratic Party (12%).

About 69.7% of the Walenstadt population aged 25–64 have completed either non-mandatory upper secondary education or additional higher education (either university or a Fachhochschule). Out of the total population in Walenstadt, as of 2000, the highest education level completed by 997 people (22.0% of the population) was primary, while 1,681 (37.1%) have completed their secondary education, 476 (10.5%) have attended tertiary school, and 203 (4.5%) are not in school. The remainder did not answer this question.

== Transportation ==
The municipality is located on the A3 motorway. There is a landing stage served by the Schiffsbetrieb Walensee boat cruises on Lake Walen.

At Lochezen, on the northern shore of Walensee, there used to be a limestone quarry (Bergwerk Lochezen). Its funicular, the Standseilbahn Lochezen, still exists.

== Economy ==
As of 2007, Walenstadt had an unemployment rate of 1.07%. As of 2005, there were 142 people employed in the primary economic sector and about 52 businesses involved in this sector. 454 people are employed in the secondary sector and there are 57 businesses in this sector. 1,278 people are employed in the tertiary sector, with 161 businesses in this sector.

As of October 2009 the average unemployment rate was 3.1%. There were 266 businesses in the municipality of which 58 were involved in the secondary sector of the economy while 160 were involved in the third.

As of 2000 there were 1,220 residents who worked in the municipality, while 1,081 residents worked outside Walenstadt and 573 people commuted into the municipality for work.

== Religion ==
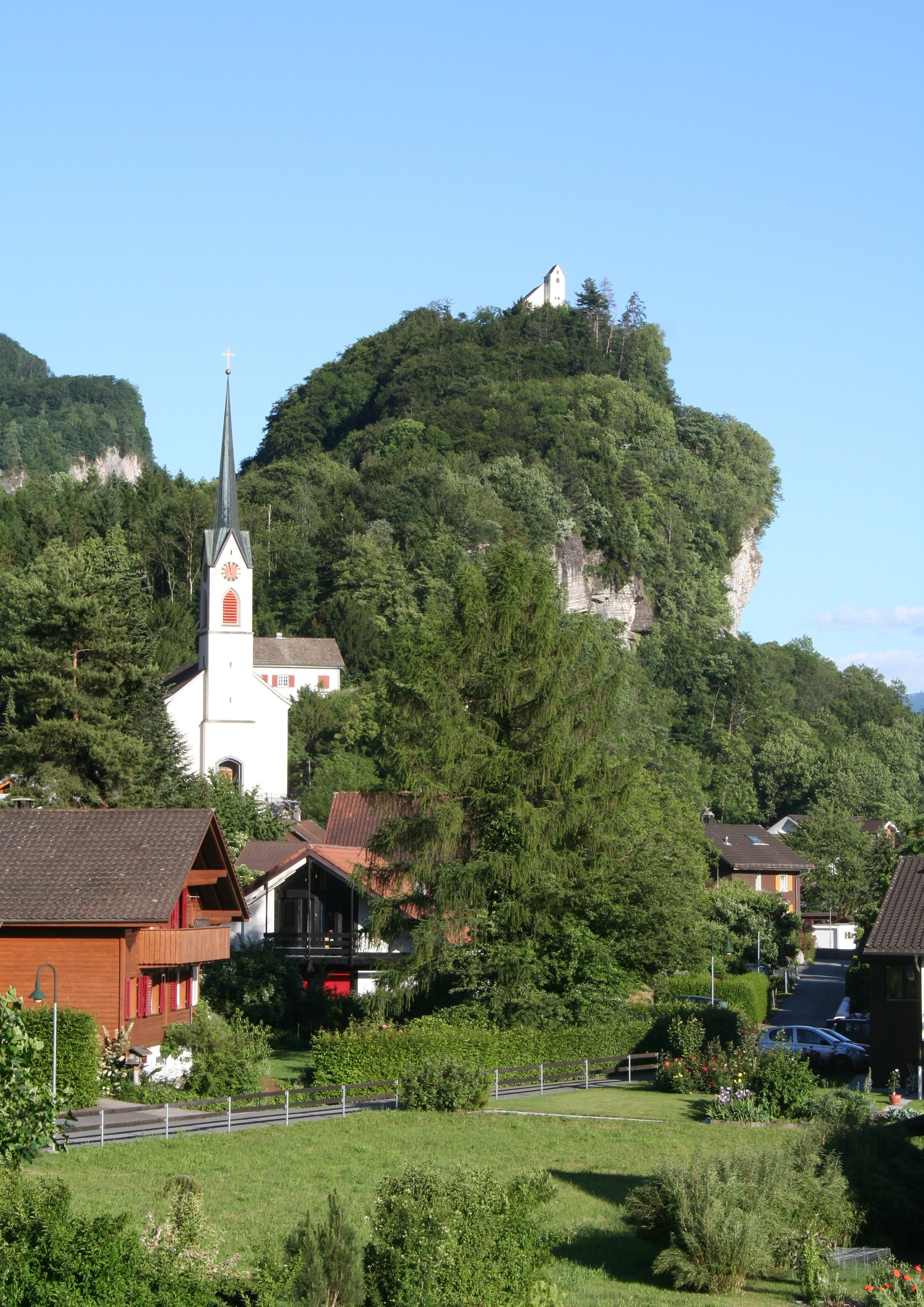
Village church of Walenstadt-Berschis, in the background is the St. Georg Chapel

From the 2000 census, 3,057 or 67.5% are Roman Catholic, while 672 or 14.8% belonged to the Swiss Reformed Church. Of the rest of the population, there is 1 individual who belongs to the Christian Catholic faith, there are 152 individuals (or about 3.35% of the population) who belong to the Orthodox Church, and there are 40 individuals (or about 0.88% of the population) who belong to another Christian church. There are 267 (or about 5.89% of the population) who are Islamic. There are 9 individuals (or about 0.20% of the population) who belong to another church (not listed on the census), 218 (or about 4.81% of the population) belong to no church, are agnostic or atheist, and 116 individuals (or about 2.56% of the population) did not answer the question.

== Historic population ==
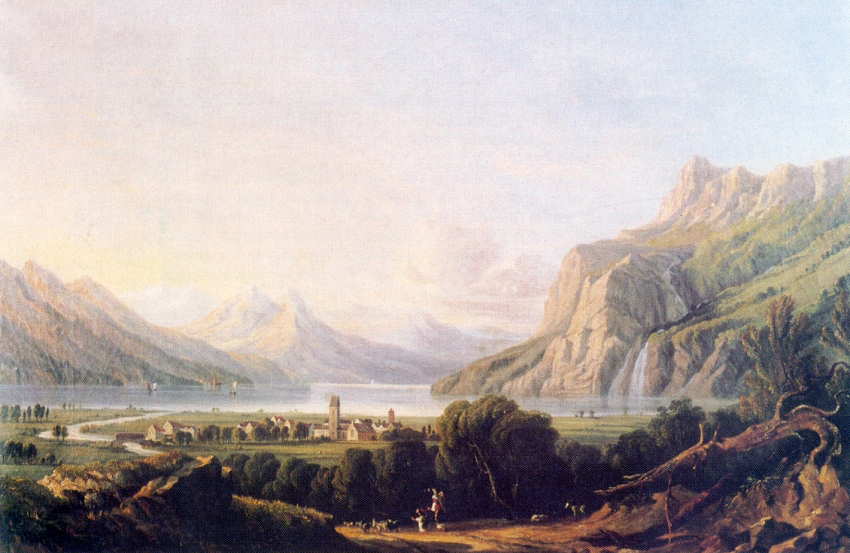
Walenstadt in 1800

Year	1850	1900	1950	1980	2000	2005
Population	1868	2994	3349	3605	4532	4749

== Heritage sites of national significance ==
The Berschis, a prehistoric hill settlement on the St. Georgenberg, and the early medieval chapel of St. Georg on the same hill are listed as Swiss heritage sites of national significance.

== Notable people ==
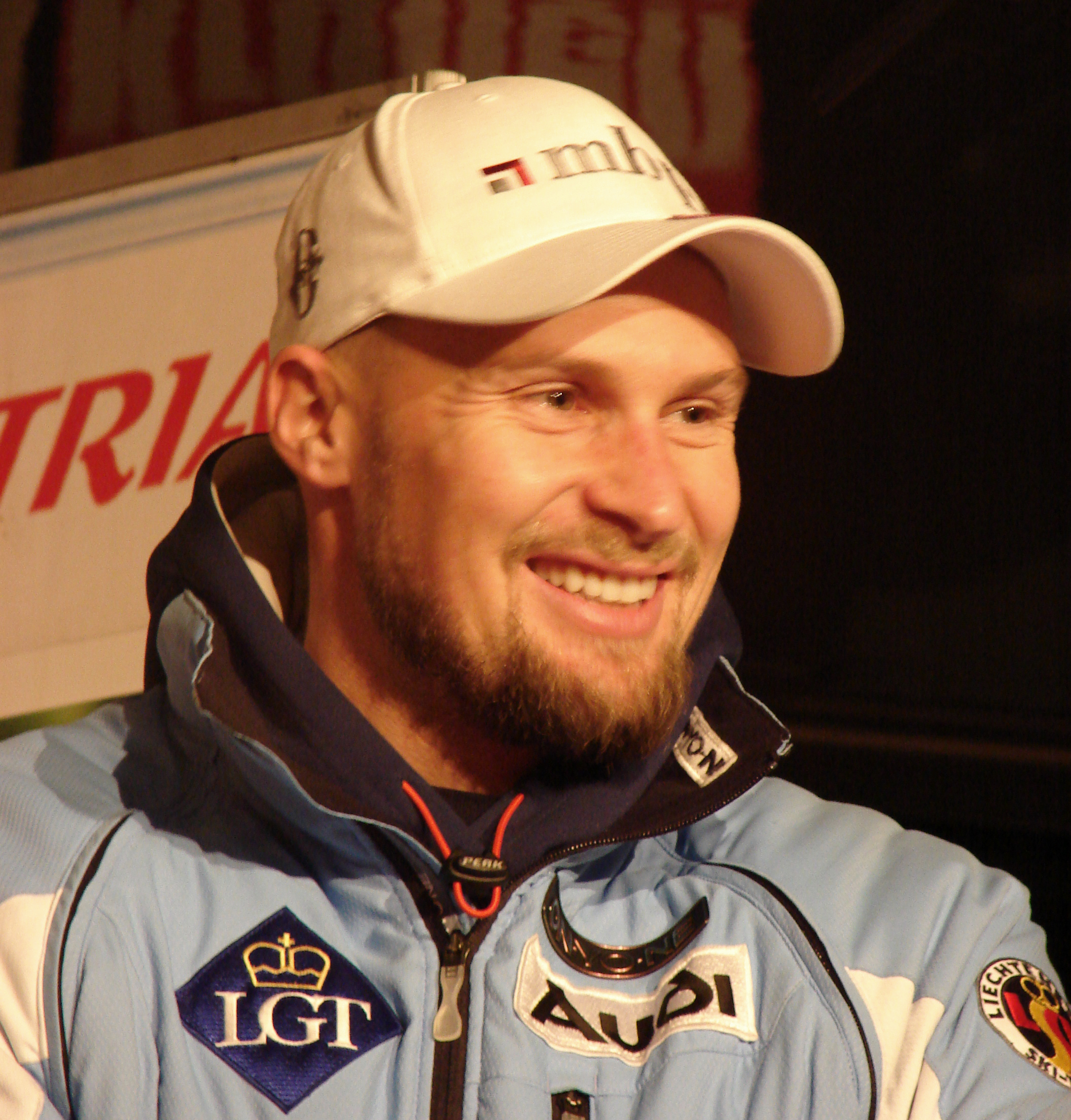
Marco Büchel, 2006

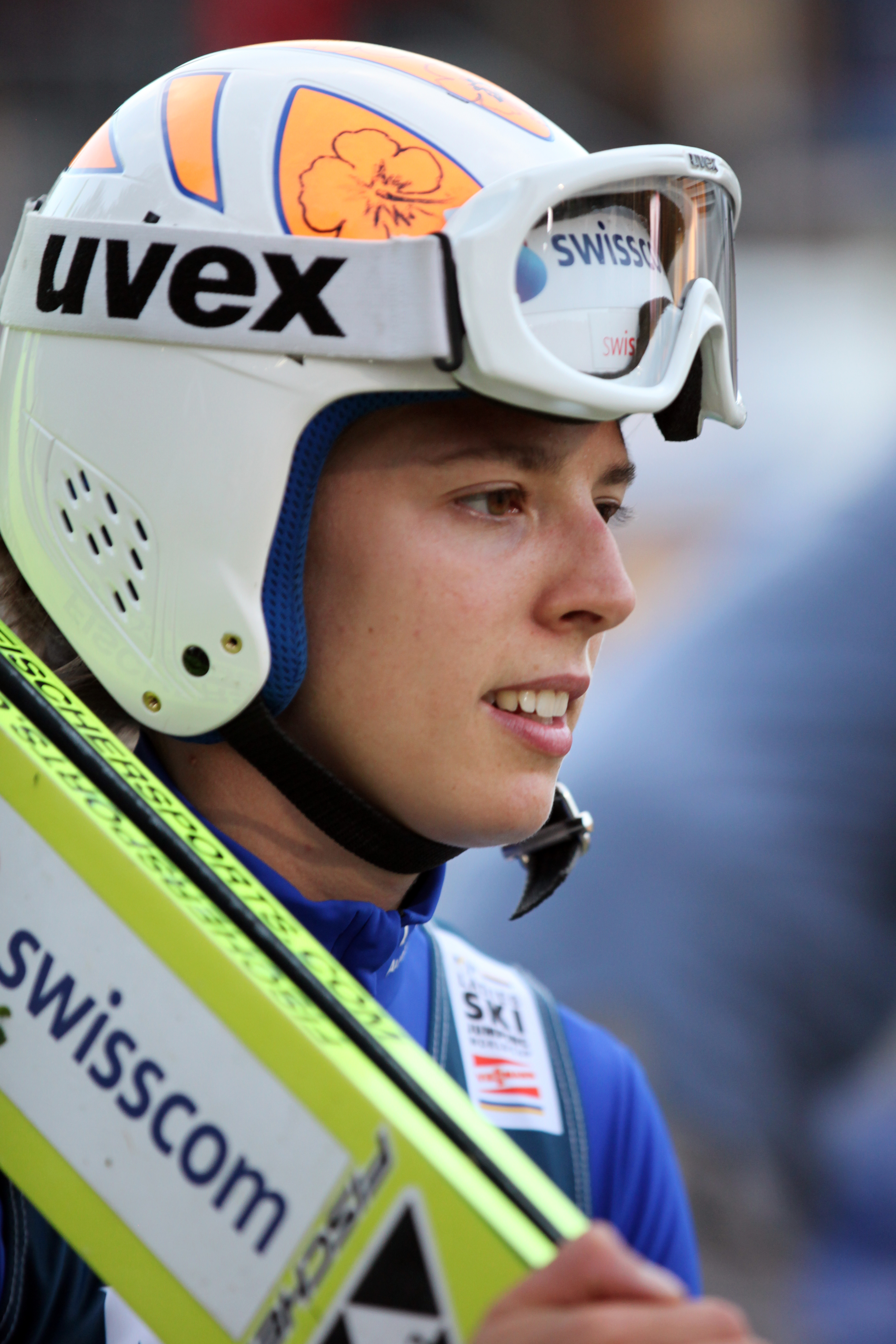
Sabrina Windmueller, 2012

- Eduard Thurneysen (1888 – 1974), a Swiss Protestant clergyman and theologian, representative of dialectical theology
- Luzius Wildhaber (born 1937), former Swiss judge in the European Court of Human Rights, citizen of Walenstadt
- Josef Ackermann (born 1948), former CEO of Deutsche Bank
- Daniel Anrig (born 1972), the thirty-fourth Commandant of the Papal Swiss Guard, 2008–2015

Sport

- Marco Büchel (born 1971), a retired alpine ski racer from Liechtenstein, competed in six Winter Olympics 1992/2010
- Alexander Hug (born 1975), ski mountaineer
- Martin Kohler (born 1985), Swiss road racing cyclist
- Martin Jäger (born 1987), Swiss biathlete
- Sabrina Windmüller (born 1987), Swiss ski jumper
- Julie Zogg (born 1992), Swiss alpine snowboarder, competed at the 2014 Winter Olympics
- Marco Pfiffner (born 1994), an alpine skier, competed for Liechtenstein at the 2014 Winter Olympics
- Boris Babic (born 1997), a Swiss football player of Serbian descent
