= Pro Patria (Switzerland) =

Pro Patria, officially Stiftung PRO PATRIA Schweizerische Bundesfeierspende, is a Swiss patriotic and charitable organization. Its purpose is to give meaning to the Swiss national holiday, August 1, by collecting donations to the benefit of social and cultural works of national public interest.

== History ==
Pro Patria was founded in 1909 as the Verein Schweizerische Bundesfeier-Spende (Swiss Federal Celebration Donation Association) by a group of public-spirited citizens led by the merchant Albert Schuster. The association's efforts were supported by the Swiss federal government and the Post Office, and Pro Patria coordinated its activities with the government during the first decades of its operation. The first Federal Celebration Collection yielded 29,000 Swiss francs and was used to support flood victims.

In the patriotic atmosphere brought about by the outbreak of World War I, Pro Patria's collections gained the support of other associations and their volunteers, including the Swiss Samaritans' Union, military associations, the Swiss Gymnastics Federation, Pro Juventute and the Swiss Hoteliers' Association. Soon, though, Swiss schoolchildren became (and have remained) the greatest part of Pro Patria volunteers.

Until long after World War II, most of Pro Patria's donation campaigns were aimed at supporting disadvantaged groups and minorities. The Swiss Red Cross was the beneficiary of eleven collection campaigns (1912, 1917, 1937, 1944, 1950, 1957, 1963, 1969, 1975, 1981 and 1987). Destitute mothers (1926, 1939, 1945, 1951, 1958, 1966, 1974, 1980 and 1985) and Swiss women's associations (1956, 1970, 1979, 1989 und 1995) were also frequently the beneficiaries of collection campaigns. Swiss soldiers and their families benefited from collections in 1916, 1918, 1929, 1940 and 1968, and the association was particularly supported by the army. In 1940, General Henri Guisan authorized the wear of the Federal Celebration Badge with military uniform; it is still the only civilian badge to benefit from such authorization. Organizations of Swiss citizens living abroad received Pro Patria donations in 1956, 1970, 1979, 1989 and 1995.

In 1991, Pro Patria was reestablished as a foundation.

== Stamps and badges ==
Pro Patria collects donations principally through the sale of postage stamps, postcards and badges, in cooperation with the Swiss Post.

Post offices sold Federal Celebration postcards from 1910 to 1960 and postage stamps since 1936. The price of these cards and stamps (marked with "Pro Patria" since 1952) exceeds their denomination, with the surcharge representing a donation to Pro Patria.

Since 1923, Pro Patria has also produced an annual Federal Celebration Badge (Bundesfeierabzeichen, 1.-August-Abzeichen), which is sold in post offices and by volunteers.
