= List of cultural property of national significance in Switzerland: St. Gallen =

This list contains all cultural property of national significance (class A) in the canton of St. Gallen from the 2009 Swiss Inventory of Cultural Property of National and Regional Significance. It is sorted by municipality and contains 77 individual buildings, 14 collections, 20 archaeological finds and 1 other, special sites or objects.

The geographic coordinates provided are in the Swiss coordinate system as given in the Inventory.

== Altstätten ==
KGS No.^{?}	Picture	Name	Street Address	CH1903 X coordinate	CH1903 Y coordinate	Location
Unknown		ISOS Kleinstadt / Flecken: Altstätten				
Unknown		ISOS Spezialfall: Schlosslandschaft Ober-/ Unterrheintal (Altstätten, Balgach, Berneck, Marbach)				

== Amden ==
KGS No.^{?}	Picture	Name	Street Address	CH1903 X coordinate	CH1903 Y coordinate	Location
9649	Betlis-Stralegg, Roman era Watch Tower, Ruined Castle	Betlis-Stralegg, Roman era Watch Tower, Ruined Castle		729.620	221.870	47.13511°N 9.147325°E

== Andwil ==
KGS No.^{?}	Picture	Name	Street Address	CH1903 X coordinate	CH1903 Y coordinate	Location
Unknown		ISOS Spezialfall: Landscapes Matten/Wilen/ Zinggenhueb (Andwil / Gossau)				

== Au ==
KGS No.^{?}	Picture	Name	Street Address	CH1903 X coordinate	CH1903 Y coordinate	Location
Unknown		ISOS Verstädtertes Dorf: Balgach / Herrbrugg				

== Bad Ragaz ==
KGS No.^{?}	Picture	Name	Street Address	CH1903 X coordinate	CH1903 Y coordinate	Location
9390	Village Baths with Trinkhalle (Water Cure Rooms)	Village Baths with Trinkhalle (Water Cure Rooms)	Bartholoméplatz 1	756.812	207.764	47.002386°N 9.500742°E
8090	St. Leonhard Chapel	St. Leonhard Chapel	Sarganserstrasse 4	756.190	208.980	47.013467°N 9.492985°E
8085	Ruins of Freudenberg Castle	Ruins of Freudenberg Castle		756.220	208.540	47.009504°N 9.493228°E

== Balgach ==
KGS No.^{?}	Picture	Name	Street Address	CH1903 X coordinate	CH1903 Y coordinate	Location
8092	Old Rathaus (Town council house)	Old Rathaus (Town council house)	Steigstrasse 17	763.654	253.054	47.407951°N 9.607131°E
Unknown		ISOS Spezialfall: Schlosslandschaft Ober-/ Unterrheintal (Altstätten, Balgach, Berneck, Marbach)				
Unknown		ISOS Verstädtertes Dorf: Balgach / Herrbrugg				

== Berg ==
KGS No.^{?}	Picture	Name	Street Address	CH1903 X coordinate	CH1903 Y coordinate	Location
9509		Kleiner Hahnberg Castle		748.980	262.316	47.494711°N 9.415868°E
Unknown		ISOS Weiler: Zwingensteinhueb				
Unknown		ISOS Spezialfall: Hahnberg				
Unknown		ISOS Spezialfall: Schlosslandschaft Rorschach / Alter Rhein (Berg, Goldach, Mörschwil, Rheineck, Rorschacherberg, St. Margrethen, Steinach, Thal, Tübach)				

== Berneck ==
KGS No.^{?}	Picture	Name	Street Address	CH1903 X coordinate	CH1903 Y coordinate	Location
Unknown		ISOS Verstädtertes Dorf: Berneck				
Unknown		ISOS Spezialfall: Schlosslandschaft Ober-/ Unterrheintal (Altstätten, Balgach, Berneck, Marbach)				
Unknown		ISOS Verstädtertes Dorf: Balgach / Herrbrugg				

== Buchs ==
KGS No.^{?}	Picture	Name	Street Address	CH1903 X coordinate	CH1903 Y coordinate	Location
Unknown		ISOS Spezialfall: Werdenberg Buchs				

== Bütschwil-Ganterschwil ==
KGS No.^{?}	Picture	Name	Street Address	CH1903 X coordinate	CH1903 Y coordinate	Location
Unknown		ISOS Urban Village: Bütschwil				

== Degersheim ==
KGS No.^{?}	Picture	Name	Street Address	CH1903 X coordinate	CH1903 Y coordinate	Location
8114	Former Parish Church of St. Verena	Former Parish Church of St. Verena	Magdenau	730.480	251.420	47.400667°N 9.167237°E
8112	Cistercian Nuns Convent of Magdenau	Cistercian Nuns Convent of Magdenau	Magdenau	730.722	251.623	47.402444°N 9.170502°E
Unknown		ISOS Verstädtertes Dorf: Degersheim				
Unknown		ISOS Spezialfall: Magdenau				

== Ebnat-Kappel ==
KGS No.^{?}	Picture	Name	Street Address	CH1903 X coordinate	CH1903 Y coordinate	Location
Unknown		ISOS Verstädtertes Dorf: Ebnat-Kappel				
Unknown		ISOS Spezialfall: Trempel				

== Eggersriet ==
KGS No.^{?}	Picture	Name	Street Address	CH1903 X coordinate	CH1903 Y coordinate	Location
Unknown		ISOS Weiler: Fürschwendi				

== Eschenbach ==
KGS No.^{?}	Picture	Name	Street Address	CH1903 X coordinate	CH1903 Y coordinate	Location
8120		Kusterhaus (Landrichterhaus)	Dorfstrasse 13	712.320	233.140	47.239625°N 8.922136°E
10481	Ruins of Fründsberg Castle	Ruins of Fründsberg Castle		713.675	238.055	47.283593°N 8.941272°E
Unknown		ISOS Weiler: Gibel				

== Flawil ==
KGS No.^{?}	Picture	Name	Street Address	CH1903 X coordinate	CH1903 Y coordinate	Location
8125	«Altes Rathaus»	«Altes Rathaus»	Burgau	733.630	252.072	47.405898°N 9.20915°E
9401	Gasthof Hirschen	Gasthof Hirschen	Oberglatt	733.370	252.666	47.411292°N 9.205883°E
Unknown		ISOS Weiler: Burgau				
Unknown		ISOS Weiler: Raaschberg				
Unknown		ISOS Spezialfall: Oberglatt				

== Flums ==
KGS No.^{?}	Picture	Name	Street Address	CH1903 X coordinate	CH1903 Y coordinate	Location
9650	Gräpplang Castle, Prehistoric Settlement, Medieval Ruined Castle	Gräpplang Castle, Prehistoric Settlement, Medieval Ruined Castle		743.750	218.620	47.102967°N 9.332489°E
8134	Chapel of St. Jakob	Chapel of St. Jakob	St. Jakob	743.327	218.273	47.099938°N 9.326808°E
8130	Catholic Church of St. Justus	Catholic Church of St. Justus	Marktstrasse	744.710	217.300	47.090888°N 9.344709°E
Unknown		ISOS Verstädtertes Dorf: Flums				

== Gaiserwald ==
KGS No.^{?}	Picture	Name	Street Address	CH1903 X coordinate	CH1903 Y coordinate	Location
8135	Catholic Parish Church of St. Josef	Catholic Parish Church of St. Josef		742.260	254.030	47.421696°N 9.324074°E

== Goldach ==
KGS No.^{?}	Picture	Name	Street Address	CH1903 X coordinate	CH1903 Y coordinate	Location
Unknown		ISOS Spezialfall: Schlosslandschaft Rorschach / Alter Rhein (Berg, Goldach, Mörschwil, Rheineck, Rorschacherberg, St. Margrethen, Steinach, Thal, Tübach)				

== Gommiswald ==
KGS No.^{?}	Picture	Name	Street Address	CH1903 X coordinate	CH1903 Y coordinate	Location
Unknown		ISOS Spezialfall: Uetliburg / Berg Sion				

== Gossau ==
KGS No.^{?}	Picture	Name	Street Address	CH1903 X coordinate	CH1903 Y coordinate	Location
9039	Former Gummibandweberei (Rubber Band Factory)	Former Gummibandweberei (Rubber Band Factory)	Stadtbühlstrasse 12	736.726	252.840	47.412168°N 9.250391°E
Unknown		ISOS Verstädtertes Dorf: Gossau (SG)				
Unknown		ISOS Spezialfall: Landscapes Matten/Wilen/Zinggenhueb (Andwil, Gossau)				

== Grabs ==
KGS No.^{?}	Picture	Name	Street Address	CH1903 X coordinate	CH1903 Y coordinate	Location
8151		Mill, Saw mill, Wool Washing Station and Hammermill	Glockenweg	751.560	227.420	47.180355°N 9.438295°E
11773	Double House	Double House	Werdenberg: Städtli 24, 25	753.459	226.127	47.168291°N 9.462899°E
11771	House	House	Werdenberg: Städtli 16	753.419	226.053	47.167634°N 9.462347°E
11772	House	House	Werdenberg: Städtli 23	753.445	226.102	47.168069°N 9.462706°E
11760	Row of Medieval Houses	Row of Medieval Houses	Werdenberg: Städtli 2–7	753.467	226.106	47.1681°N 9.462998°E
10127	«Schlangenhaus»	«Schlangenhaus»	Werdenberg: Städtli 14	753.432	226.045	47.16756°N 9.462515°E
8149	Werdenberg Castle	Werdenberg Castle	Werdenberg	753.366	226.145	47.168474°N 9.461679°E
10126	Werdenberg City Walls	Werdenberg City Walls	Werdenberg	753.470	226.130	47.168315°N 9.463045°E
Unknown		ISOS Spezialfall: Werdenberg (Buchs				

== Hemberg ==
KGS No.^{?}	Picture	Name	Street Address	CH1903 X coordinate	CH1903 Y coordinate	Location
10128	«Rotes Haus»	«Rotes Haus»	Bächli, Brugg 693	732.243	240.188	47.299315°N 9.187271°E
Unknown		ISOS Dorf: Hemberg				

== Kirchberg ==
KGS No.^{?}	Picture	Name	Street Address	CH1903 X coordinate	CH1903 Y coordinate	Location
10129	Catholic Parish and Pilgrimage Church of St Peter Und Paul	Catholic Parish and Pilgrimage Church of St Peter Und Paul	Wilerstrasse	720.885	252.442	47.411688°N 9.040434°E
Unknown		ISOS Weiler: Bäbikon				

== Lichtensteig ==
KGS No.^{?}	Picture	Name	Street Address	CH1903 X coordinate	CH1903 Y coordinate	Location
8178	Old Rathaus (Town council house)	Old Rathaus (Town council house)	Hintergasse 22	724.592	242.636	47.322818°N 9.086812°E
Unknown		ISOS Kleinstadt / Flecken (Lichtensteig				

== Lütisburg ==
KGS No.^{?}	Picture	Name	Street Address	CH1903 X coordinate	CH1903 Y coordinate	Location
Unknown		ISOS Spezialfall: Lütisburg				

== Marbach ==
KGS No.^{?}	Picture	Name	Street Address	CH1903 X coordinate	CH1903 Y coordinate	Location
Unknown		ISOS Dorf: Marbach				
Unknown		ISOS Spezialfall: Schlosslandschaft Ober-/ Unterrheintal (Altstätten, Balgach, Berneck, Marbach)				

== Mels ==
KGS No.^{?}	Picture	Name	Street Address	CH1903 X coordinate	CH1903 Y coordinate	Location
8189	Castels Prehistoric to Medieval Hilltop Settlement	Castels; Prehistoric to Medieval Hilltop Settlement		749.930	212.825	47.049487°N 9.411955°E
9651	Early Medieval Church of St Peter and Paul	Early Medieval Church of St Peter and Paul		750.725	212.520	47.046564°N 9.422313°E
Unknown		ISOS Verstädtertes Dorf: Mels				
Unknown		ISOS Dorf: Weisstannen				

== Mörschwil ==
KGS No.^{?}	Picture	Name	Street Address	CH1903 X coordinate	CH1903 Y coordinate	Location
Unknown		ISOS Spezialfall: Schlosslandschaft Rorschach / Alter Rhein (Berg, Goldach, Mörschwil, Rheineck, Rorschacherberg, St. Margrethen, Steinach, Thal, Tübach)				

== Muolen ==
KGS No.^{?}	Picture	Name	Street Address	CH1903 X coordinate	CH1903 Y coordinate	Location
Unknown		ISOS Spezialfall: Kulturlandschaft Unteregg / Rotzenwil / Hueb u.a.				

== Neckertal ==
KGS No.^{?}	Picture	Name	Street Address	CH1903 X coordinate	CH1903 Y coordinate	Location
8194	Haus Näf	Haus Näf	Furth: Furt 520	729.375	243.310	47.327958°N 9.15026°E
8195	Oberes Türmlihaus	Oberes Türmlihaus	Furth: Furtstrasse 93	729.836	243.289	47.327679°N 9.156351°E
10141	Unteres Türmlihaus	Unteres Türmlihaus	Furth: Furtstrasse 95	729.744	243.262	47.327454°N 9.155126°E
Unknown		ISOS Dorf: Mogelsberg				
Unknown		ISOS Spezialfall: Spreitenbach / Furth				

== Nesslau ==
KGS No.^{?}	Picture	Name	Street Address	CH1903 X coordinate	CH1903 Y coordinate	Location
10142	House	House	Neu St. Johann: Sidwaldstrasse 6	732.937	232.568	47.230654°N 9.194191°E
8176	Former Benedictine St. John's Abbey	Former Benedictine St. John's Abbey	Neu St. Johann: Johanneumstrasse 1, 3	732.888	232.398	47.229135°N 9.193494°E
Unknown		ISOS Dorf: Ennetbühl				

== Niederbüren ==
KGS No.^{?}	Picture	Name	Street Address	CH1903 X coordinate	CH1903 Y coordinate	Location
8519	Textile Museum in Sorntal	Textile Museum in Sorntal		735.146	259.658	47.4738°N 9.231525°E
10143	House	House	Staatsstrasse 35	733.066	258.808	47.466581°N 9.203686°E

== Niederhelfenschwil ==
KGS No.^{?}	Picture	Name	Street Address	CH1903 X coordinate	CH1903 Y coordinate	Location
8205	Catholic Parish Church of St. Johannes Baptist	Catholic Parish Church of St. Johannes Baptist		731.792	259.840	47.476117°N 9.187098°E
8206	Zuckenriet Castle	Zuckenriet Castle		729.994	261.197	47.488677°N 9.163647°E

== Oberriet ==
KGS No.^{?}	Picture	Name	Street Address	CH1903 X coordinate	CH1903 Y coordinate	Location
8213	Montlingerberg, Prehistoric Hilltop Settlement	Montlingerberg, Prehistoric Hilltop Settlement		762.360	245.140	47.337117°N 9.587123°E
8215	Ruins of Wichenstein Castle	Ruins of Wichenstein Castle		759.880	243.960	47.327113°N 9.5539°E

== Oberuzwil ==
KGS No.^{?}	Picture	Name	Street Address	CH1903 X coordinate	CH1903 Y coordinate	Location
Unknown		ISOS Weiler: Niederglatt				

== Pfäfers ==
KGS No.^{?}	Picture	Name	Street Address	CH1903 X coordinate	CH1903 Y coordinate	Location
8222	Old Mineral Baths with Chapel	Old Mineral Baths with Chapel	Bad Pfäfers	755.923	204.562	46.973803°N 9.487957°E
8225	Ruins of Wartenstein Castle	Ruins of Wartenstein Castle		757.600	206.880	46.994251°N 9.510793°E
8223	Former Benedictine Abbey	Former Benedictine Abbey		756.965	206.425	46.99031°N 9.50229°E
8224	Drachenloch, Paleolithic Cave	Drachenloch, Paleolithic Cave	Vättis	750.440	199.060	46.925593°N 9.414103°E
Unknown		ISOS Dorf: Vättis				

== Rapperswil-Jona ==
KGS No.^{?}	Picture	Name	Street Address	CH1903 X coordinate	CH1903 Y coordinate	Location
8158	Chapel of St. Dionys	Chapel of St. Dionys	St Dionysstrasse	707.760	231.686	47.227308°N 8.861574°E
8242	Kempraten, Roman era Vicus	Kempraten, Roman era Vicus		704.630	232.595	47.235986°N 8.820463°E
8234; 8573	Rapperswil Castle and Archive/Library in the Polenmuseum	Rapperswil Castle and Archive/Library in the Polenmuseum		704.270	231.621	47.227284°N 8.815484°E
8233	Rathaus (Town council house) of Rapperswil	Rathaus (Town council house) of Rapperswil	Hauptplatz 1	704.334	231.511	47.226284°N 8.816303°E
9652	Seedamm, Prehistoric and Medieval Bridge	Seedamm, Prehistoric and Medieval Bridge		704.020	230.945	47.221244°N 8.812027°E
Unknown	ISOS Kleinstadt / Flecken: Rapperswil	ISOS Kleinstadt / Flecken: Rapperswil				
Unknown	ISOS Spezialfall: Bollingen	ISOS Spezialfall: Bollingen				

== Rheineck ==
KGS No.^{?}	Picture	Name	Street Address	CH1903 X coordinate	CH1903 Y coordinate	Location
8248	Löwenhof	Löwenhof	Rorschacherstrasse 15	761.928	259.679	47.467941°N 9.586675°E
Unknown		ISOS Kleinstadt / Flecken: Rheineck				
Unknown		ISOS Spezialfall: Schlosslandschaft Rorschach / Alter Rhein (Berg, Goldach, Mörschwil, Rheineck, Rorschacherberg, St. Margrethen, Steinach, Thal, Tübach)				

== Rieden ==
KGS No.^{?}	Picture	Name	Street Address	CH1903 X coordinate	CH1903 Y coordinate	Location
Unknown		ISOS Dorf: Rieden				

== Rorschach ==
KGS No.^{?}	Picture	Name	Street Address	CH1903 X coordinate	CH1903 Y coordinate	Location
8259	Former Granary	Former Granary	Hauptstrasse 58	754.744	260.749	47.479291°N 9.49179°E
8258	Former Benedictine Abbey of Mariaberg now Kantonales Lehrerseminar	Former Benedictine Abbey of Mariaberg now Kantonales Lehrerseminar	Seminarstrasse 27	754.991	260.013	47.472615°N 9.49481°E
Unknown		ISOS Kleinstadt / Flecken: Rorschach				
Unknown		ISOS Spezialfall: Schlosslandschaft Rorschach / Alter Rhein (Berg, Goldach, Mörschwil, Rheineck, Rorschacherberg, St. Margrethen, Steinach, Thal, Tübach)				

== Rorschacherberg ==
KGS No.^{?}	Picture	Name	Street Address	CH1903 X coordinate	CH1903 Y coordinate	Location
Unknown		ISOS Spezialfall: Schlosslandschaft Rorschach / Alter Rhein (Berg, Goldach, Mörschwil, Rheineck, Rorschacherberg, St. Margrethen, Steinach, Thal, Tübach)				

== Rüthi ==
KGS No.^{?}	Picture	Name	Street Address	CH1903 X coordinate	CH1903 Y coordinate	Location
Unknown		ISOS Dorf: Rüthi (SG)				

== Sargans ==
KGS No.^{?}	Picture	Name	Street Address	CH1903 X coordinate	CH1903 Y coordinate	Location
8272	Gonzen Bergwerke, Mine, Ruins and Gravel Works	Gonzen Bergwerke, Mine, Ruins and Gravel Works		752.900	213.800	47.057576°N 9.451358°E
8270	Sargans Castle	Sargans Castle		751.851	212.957	47.050237°N 9.437272°E
Unknown		ISOS Kleinstadt / Flecken: Sargans				

== Schänis ==
KGS No.^{?}	Picture	Name	Street Address	CH1903 X coordinate	CH1903 Y coordinate	Location
8277		Biberlikopf, Roman era Watch Tower		723.720	221.480	47.132732°N 9.069465°E
8282	Former Damenstift (Women's Collegiate Foundation) zum Heiligen Kreuz	Former Damenstift (Women's Collegiate Foundation) zum Heiligen Kreuz	Rathausplatz 1	721.828	224.469	47.159963°N 9.045339°E
8278	Gallusturm (Tower)	Gallusturm (Tower)	Gallusgasse	721.935	224.604	47.161157°N 9.046786°E
Unknown		ISOS Dorf: Schänis				
Unknown		ISOS Weiler: Maseltrangen				

== Schmerikon ==
KGS No.^{?}	Picture	Name	Street Address	CH1903 X coordinate	CH1903 Y coordinate	Location
Unknown		ISOS Dorf: Schmerikon				

== St. Gallen ==
KGS No.^{?}	Picture	Name	Street Address	CH1903 X coordinate	CH1903 Y coordinate	Location
8314	Broderbrunnen (Fountain)	Broderbrunnen (Fountain)	St. Leonhard-Strasse / Oberer Graben	746.009	254.369	47.423923°N 9.373853°E
8295	Former Dominican Nuns Convent of St. Katharina	Former Dominican Nuns Convent of St. Katharina		746.236	254.731	47.427128°N 9.376979°E
8304	Railroad Bridge Bodensee-Toggenburgbahn (Shared with Herisau)	Railroad Bridge Bodensee-Toggenburgbahn (Shared with Herisau)		742.388	251.672	47.400466°N 9.325019°E
8306		Eisensteg Zweibruggen (Shared with Stein)	Haggenstrasse	743.472	251.626	47.399817°N 9.33936°E
8354	Geschäftshaus Oceanic	Geschäftshaus Oceanic	St. Leonhard-Strasse 20	745.879	254.290	47.423242°N 9.372105°E
8355	Geschäftshaus Washington	Geschäftshaus Washington	Rosenbergstrasse 20, 22	745.832	254.539	47.425491°N 9.371563°E
8296	Main Train Station	Main Train Station	Bahnhofplatz 2	745.705	254.283	47.423217°N 9.369797°E
8297	Main Post Office	Main Post Office	Bahnhofplatz 5	745.714	254.199	47.42246°N 9.369889°E
8513	Historisches Museum and Völkerkundemuseum	Historisches Museum and Völkerkundemuseum	Museumstrasse 50	746.682	254.913	47.428665°N 9.382948°E
8299; 8815; 9342		Cantonal Library and City Archives (Vadiana)	Notkerstrasse 22	746.613	254.967	47.429166°N 9.382052°E
8333	Kantonsschule St. Gallen	Kantonsschule St. Gallen	Burggraben 21	746.485	254.554	47.425481°N 9.38022°E
10154	Catholic Parish Church of St. Maria Neudorf	Catholic Parish Church of St. Maria Neudorf	Rorschacherstrasse 257	748.492	256.066	47.438626°N 9.407314°E
8310	Kräzern-Strassenbrücke with Zollhaus	Kräzern-Strassenbrücke with Zollhaus	Krätzernstrasse	742.150	252.320	47.406344°N 9.322073°E
8302; 8516; 8517	Art Museum and Natural History Museum	Art Museum and Natural History Museum	Museumstrasse 32	746.583	254.814	47.427797°N 9.381604°E
9511	Lokremise with Wasserturm	Lokremise with Wasserturm	Grünbergstrasse 7	745.400	254.082	47.421478°N 9.365691°E
9654	Medieval / Early Modern City	Medieval / Early Modern City		746.240	254.400	47.424151°N 9.376924°E
8552	Museum in Lagerhaus	Museum in Lagerhaus	Davidstrasse 44	745.517	253.887	47.419698°N 9.367178°E
8303	Swiss Reformed of St. Laurenzenkirche	Swiss Reformed of St. Laurenzenkirche	Marktgasse 25	746.245	254.430	47.424419°N 9.377°E
8776; 8795	State Archives of the Canton of St. Gallen	State Archives of the Canton of St. Gallen	Klosterhof 1	746.295	254.382	47.423977°N 9.377646°E
8995	City Theater	City Theater	Museumsstrasse 24	746.501	254.716	47.426934°N 9.380485°E
8775; 9343; 8312	Collegiate Buildings with Cathedral and Library	Collegiate Buildings with Cathedral and Library	Klosterhof 1–8	746.297	254.343	47.423626°N 9.37766°E
8515	Textile Museum	Textile Museum	Vadianstrasse 2	745.986	254.307	47.423371°N 9.373528°E
8348	Tröckneturm	Tröckneturm	Burgweiherweg 569	744.111	253.441	47.415997°N 9.348407°E
8331	University of St. Gallen (HSG)	University of St. Gallen (HSG)	Dufourstrasse 48, 50	746.033	255.229	47.431651°N 9.374452°E
8352		Volksbad	Volksbadstrasse 4, 6	746.806	254.889	47.428422°N 9.384583°E
Unknown		ISOS Spezialfall: Bruggen / Sittertal				
Unknown		ISOS Spezialfall: Landscapes Kapf / Notkersegg				

== St. Margrethen ==
KGS No.^{?}	Picture	Name	Street Address	CH1903 X coordinate	CH1903 Y coordinate	Location
8358	Old St. Margaretha Church	Old St. Margaretha Church		764.605	258.377	47.455571°N 9.621688°E
Unknown		ISOS Spezialfall: Schlosslandschaft Rorschach / Alter Rhein (Berg, Goldach, Mörschwil, Rheineck, Rorschacherberg, St. Margrethen, Steinach, Thal, Tübach)				

== Steinach ==
KGS No.^{?}	Picture	Name	Street Address	CH1903 X coordinate	CH1903 Y coordinate	Location
Unknown		ISOS Spezialfall: Schlosslandschaft Rorschach / Alter Rhein (Berg, Goldach, Mörschwil, Rheineck, Rorschacherberg, St. Margrethen, Steinach, Thal, Tübach)				

== Thal ==
KGS No.^{?}	Picture	Name	Street Address	CH1903 X coordinate	CH1903 Y coordinate	Location
Unknown		ISOS Dorf: Thal / Feldmoos				
Unknown		ISOS Spezialfall: Landscapes Buechberg / Buechstig				
Unknown		ISOS Spezialfall: Schlosslandschaft Rorschach / Alter Rhein (Berg, Goldach, Mörschwil, Rheineck, Rorschacherberg, St. Margrethen, Steinach, Thal, Tübach)				

== Tübach ==
KGS No.^{?}	Picture	Name	Street Address	CH1903 X coordinate	CH1903 Y coordinate	Location
8373	Capuchin Nuns Convent of St. Scholastika	Capuchin Nuns Convent of St. Scholastika	Schulstrasse 38	751.863	260.861	47.480969°N 9.453619°E
Unknown		ISOS Spezialfall: Schlosslandschaft Rorschach / Alter Rhein (Berg, Goldach, Mörschwil, Rheineck, Rorschacherberg, St. Margrethen, Steinach, Thal, Tübach)				

== Untereggen ==
KGS No.^{?}	Picture	Name	Street Address	CH1903 X coordinate	CH1903 Y coordinate	Location
Unknown		ISOS Spezialfall: Sulzberg				

== Uzwil ==
KGS No.^{?}	Picture	Name	Street Address	CH1903 X coordinate	CH1903 Y coordinate	Location
8518		Hauser & Wirth Collection Henau	Felseggstrasse 51	726.790	258.221	47.462543°N 9.120297°E
8382		Villa Waldbühl	Waldbühl 996	727.565	256.327	47.445362°N 9.130032°E

== Waldkirch ==
KGS No.^{?}	Picture	Name	Street Address	CH1903 X coordinate	CH1903 Y coordinate	Location
8386	Catholic Parish Church of St. Johannes Baptist	Catholic Parish Church of St. Johannes Baptist	Bernhardzell, Kirchstrasse	743.050	259.850	47.473855°N 9.336405°E

== Walenstadt ==
KGS No.^{?}	Picture	Name	Street Address	CH1903 X coordinate	CH1903 Y coordinate	Location
8390; 9655	St. Georgenberg, Prehistoric-Early Middle Ages Hilltop Settlement and St. Georg Chapel	St. Georgenberg, Prehistoric-Early Middle Ages; Hilltop Settlement and St. Georg Chapel		745.170	218.530	47.101848°N 9.351161°E
Unknown		ISOS Kleinstadt / Flecken: Walenstadt				

== Wartau ==
KGS No.^{?}	Picture	Name	Street Address	CH1903 X coordinate	CH1903 Y coordinate	Location
8396	Gretschins-Herrenfeld / Ochsenberg Prehistoric Settlement and Sacrifice Site Medieval Fortress and Ruins	Gretschins-Herrenfeld / Ochsenberg; Prehistoric Settlement and Sacrifice Site; Medieval Fortress and Ruins		755.750	218.420	47.098455°N 9.490448°E
8397	So-Called Walser Rathaus (Town council house) auf Palfries	So-Called Walser Rathaus (Town council house) auf Palfries		748.974	218.058	47.096759°N 9.401101°E
Unknown		ISOS Dorf: Azmoos				
Unknown		ISOS Dorf: Oberschan				
Unknown		ISOS Weiler: Fontnas				
Unknown		ISOS Weiler: Gretschins				

== Wattwil ==
KGS No.^{?}	Picture	Name	Street Address	CH1903 X coordinate	CH1903 Y coordinate	Location
Unknown		ISOS Verstädtertes Dorf: Wattwil				
Unknown		ISOS Kleinstadt / Flecken (Lichtensteig				

== Weesen ==
KGS No.^{?}	Picture	Name	Street Address	CH1903 X coordinate	CH1903 Y coordinate	Location
9656		Altweesen, late-Roman era Castle/Medieval Abandoned Settlement		725.480	221.515	47.132715°N 9.092667°E
Unknown		ISOS Kleinstadt / Flecken: Weesen				

== Wil ==
KGS No.^{?}	Picture	Name	Street Address	CH1903 X coordinate	CH1903 Y coordinate	Location
8413	Baronenhaus	Baronenhaus	Marktgasse 73	721.479	258.636	47.467276°N 9.049988°E
9341		Dominican Nuns Convent of St. Katharina	Bibliothek,	721.501	258.366	47.464844°N 9.050206°E
8414	Hof	Hof	Marktgasse 88, 90	721.485	258.680	47.467671°N 9.050079°E
8106	Pilgrimage Church of Maria-Hilf	Pilgrimage Church of Maria-Hilf	Dreibrunnen, Kapellstrasse	719.580	259.072	47.471545°N 9.024922°E
Unknown		ISOS Kleinstadt / Flecken: Wil				

== Wildhaus-Alt St. Johann ==
KGS No.^{?}	Picture	Name	Street Address	CH1903 X coordinate	CH1903 Y coordinate	Location
8071	Wildenmannlisloch, Paleolithic Cave	Wildenmannlisloch, Paleolithic Cave		737.730	225.690	47.167823°N 9.255363°E
8422	Birth Place of Huldrych Zwingli	Birth Place of Huldrych Zwingli	Wildhaus, Lisighus 167	744.059	229.520	47.200915°N 9.340038°E

== Wittenbach ==
KGS No.^{?}	Picture	Name	Street Address	CH1903 X coordinate	CH1903 Y coordinate	Location
Unknown		ISOS Weiler: Dottenwil / Unterrüti				
Unknown		ISOS Weiler: Unterlören				
