= Staatsarchiv =

Staatsarchiv may refer to the archives of one of several national or sub-national governments:

- Hessisches Staatsarchiv Marburg, the archives of the state of Hesse, situated in Marburg, Germany
- Österreichisches Staatsarchiv, the national archives of Austria
- Staatsarchiv Bern, the archives of the canton of Bern, Switzerland
- Staatsarchiv Ludwigsburg, the archives of various public bodies in and around the city of Stuttgart, Germany
- Staatsarchiv München, the archives of the administration of Upper Bavaria, Germany
- Staatsarchiv des Kantons St. Gallen, the archives of the canton of St Gallen, Switzerland
- Staatsarchiv Zürich, the archives of the canton of Zürich, Switzerland
