= Freudenberg Castle =

Castle in Bad Ragaz (Switzerland)

- Bad Ragaz
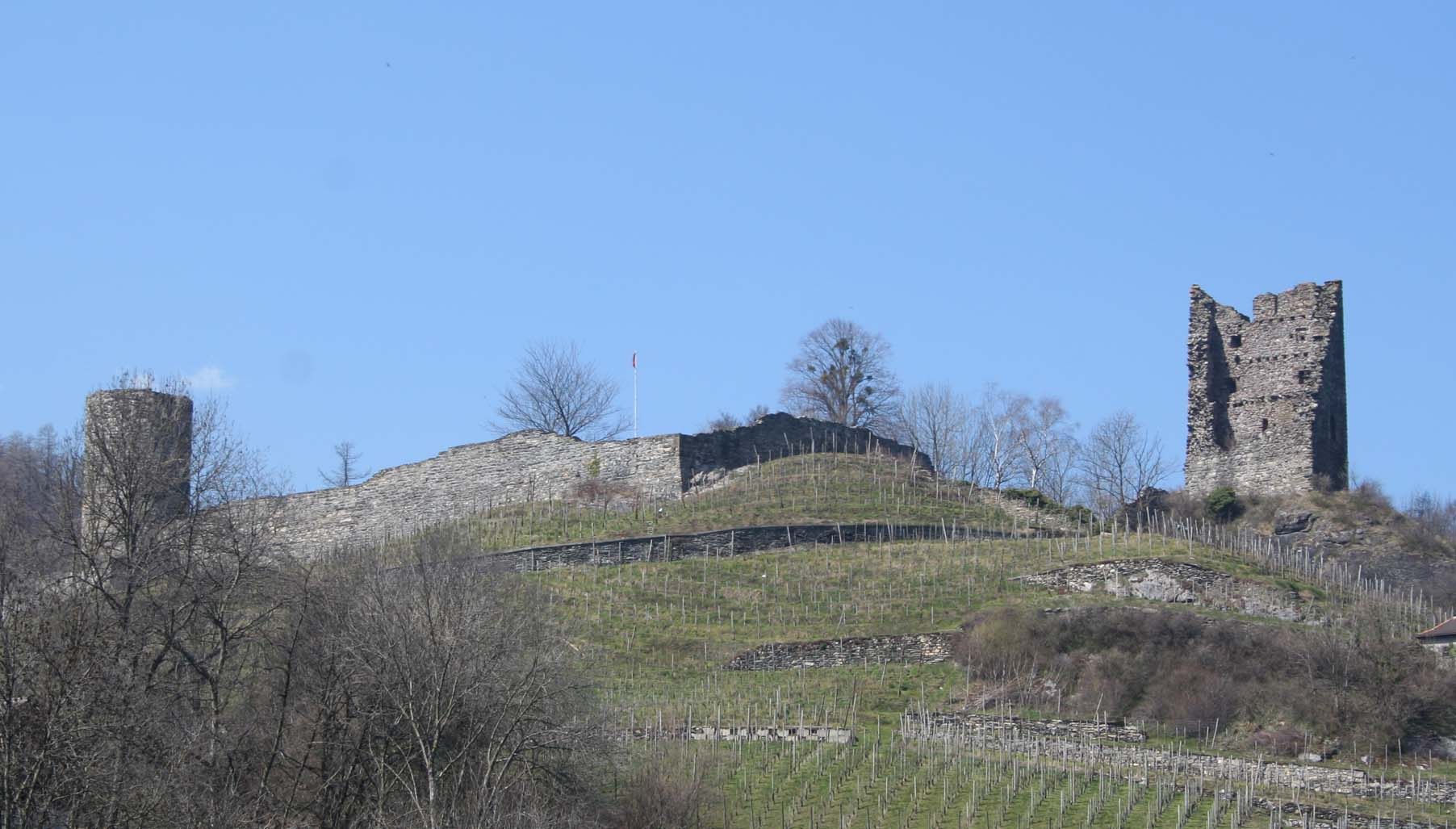
- Ruins of Freudenberg castle

Site information
- Type: hill castle
- Code: CH-SG
- Condition: ruin

Location
- Coordinates: 47°0′32″N 9°29′33″E

Site history
- Built: about 1200-1250

Freudenberg Castle is a castle in the municipality of Bad Ragaz of the Canton of St. Gallen in Switzerland. It is a Swiss heritage site of national significance.

== Gallery ==
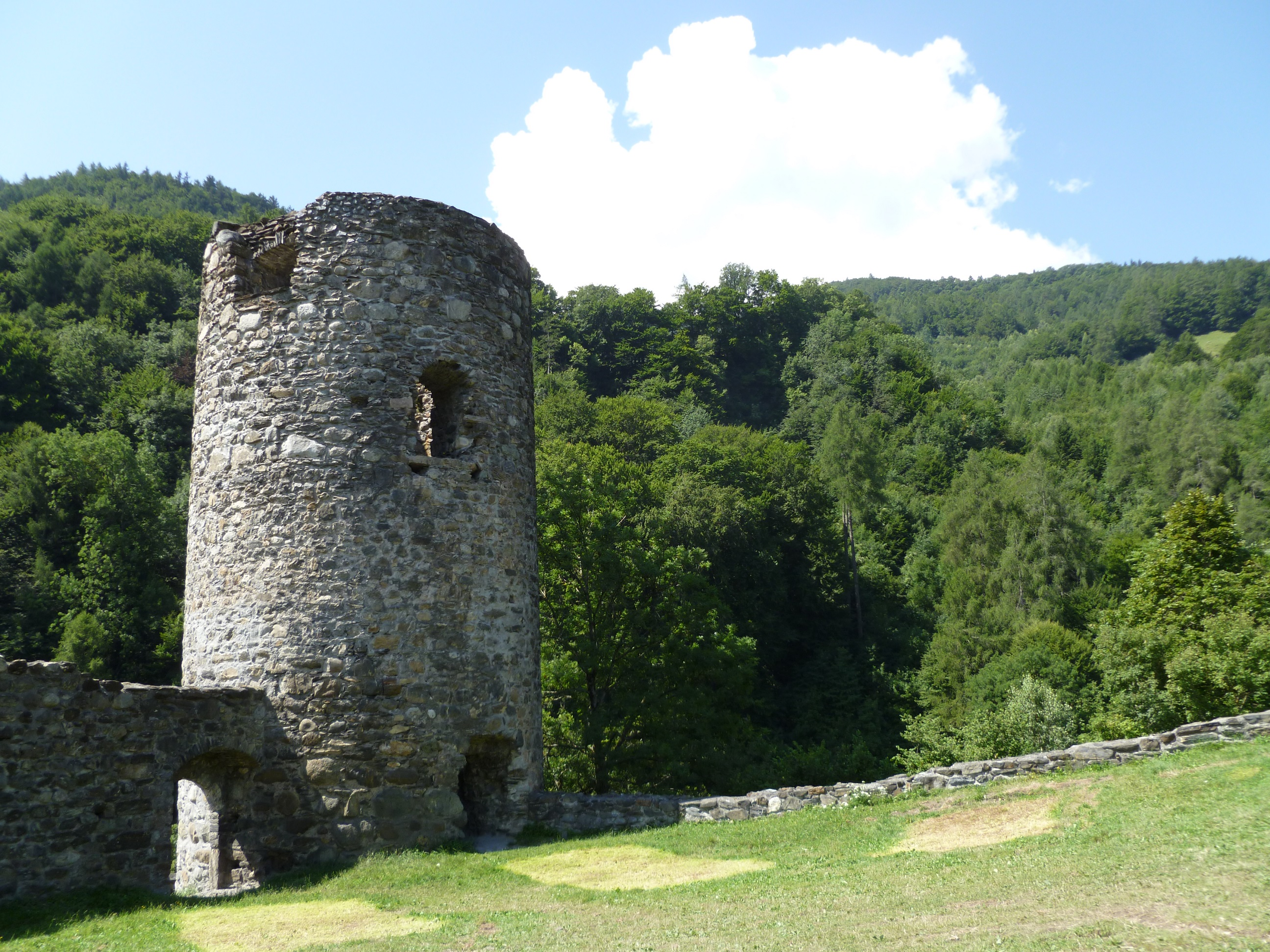
Round tower with gate

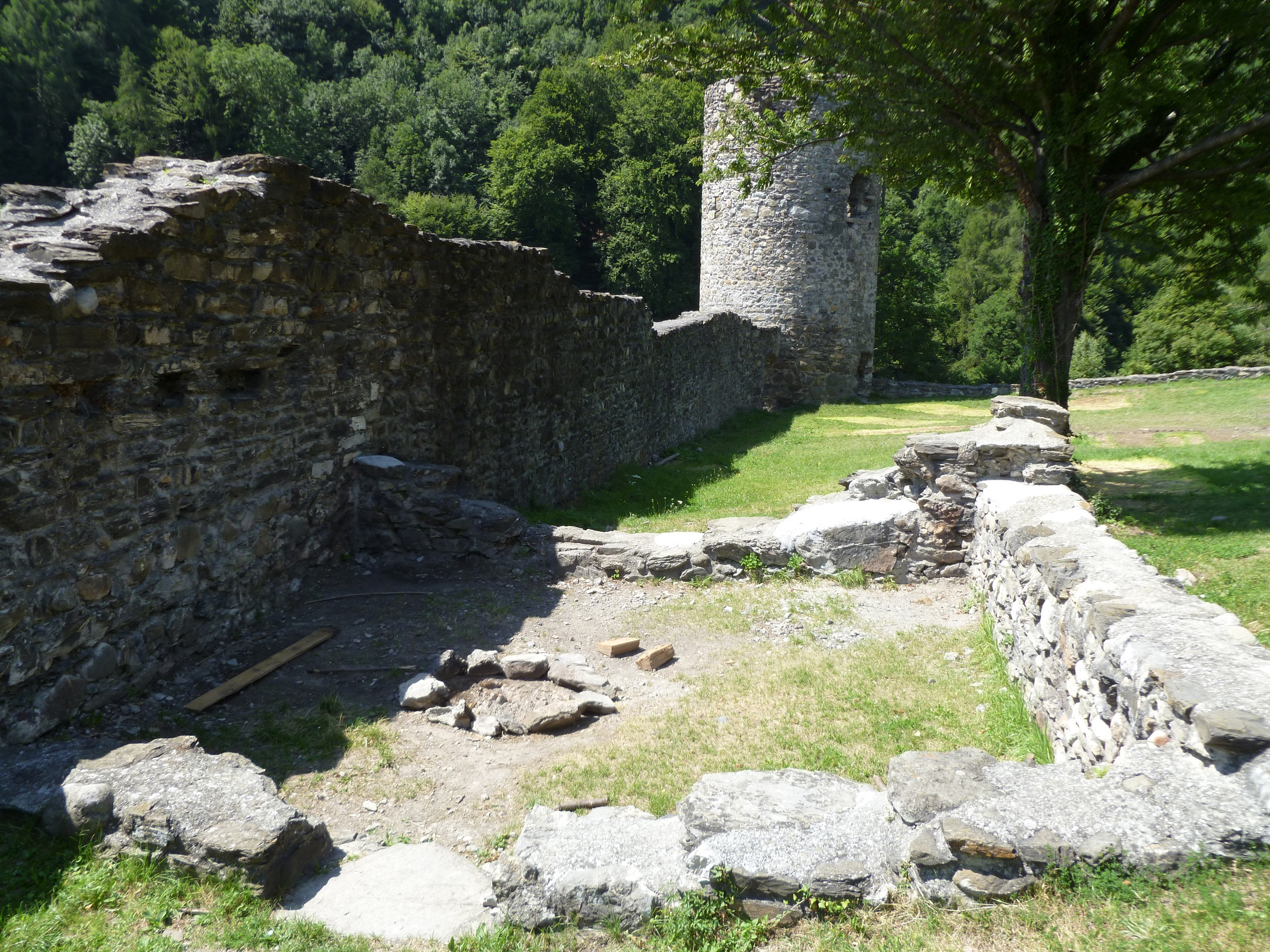
Remains of the farm buildings

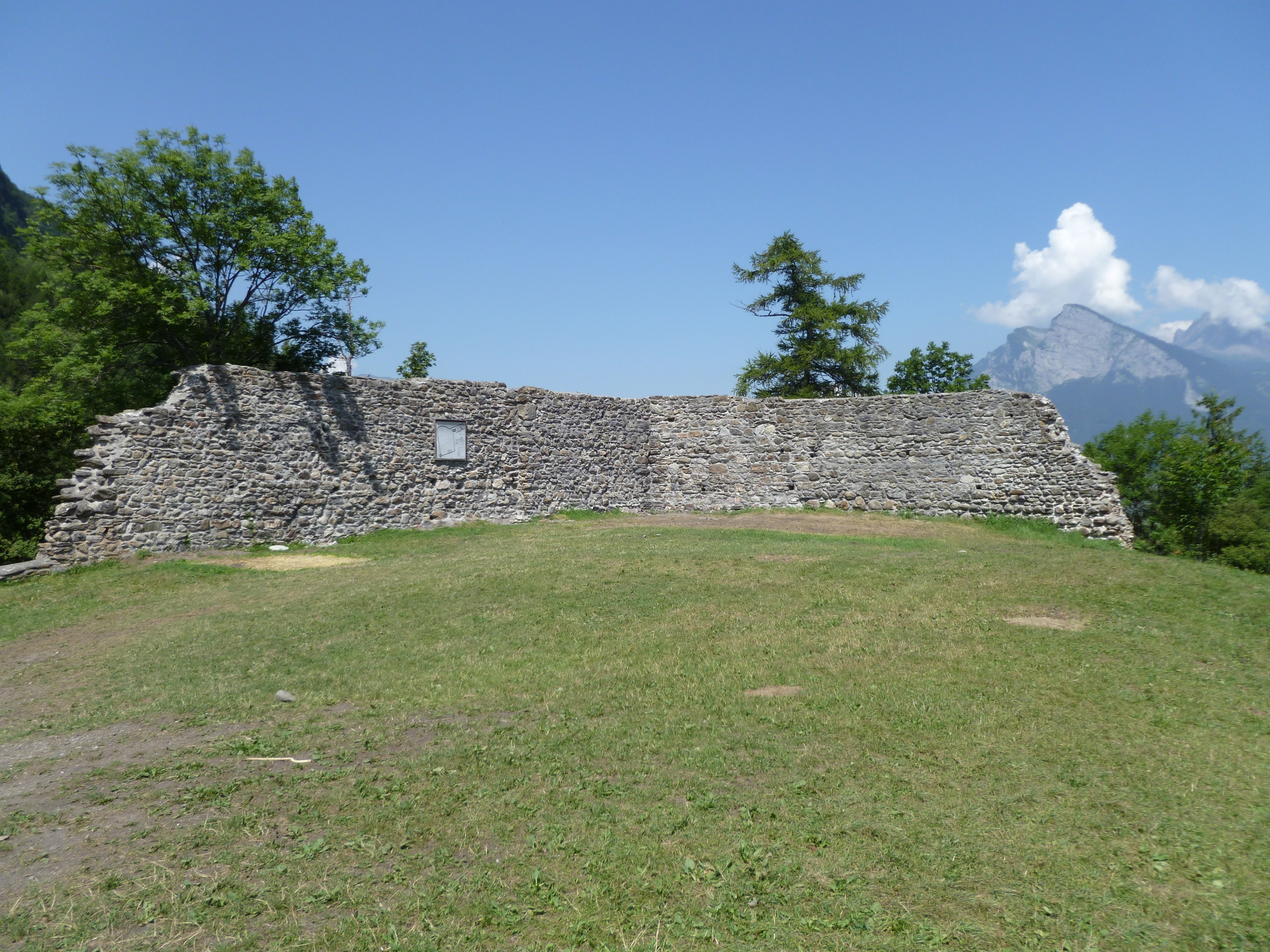
Corner tower

== See also ==
- List of castles in Switzerland
