= Gräpplang Castle =

Castle in Flums, Switzerland

- Castrum Flumius
- Flums-Gräpplang
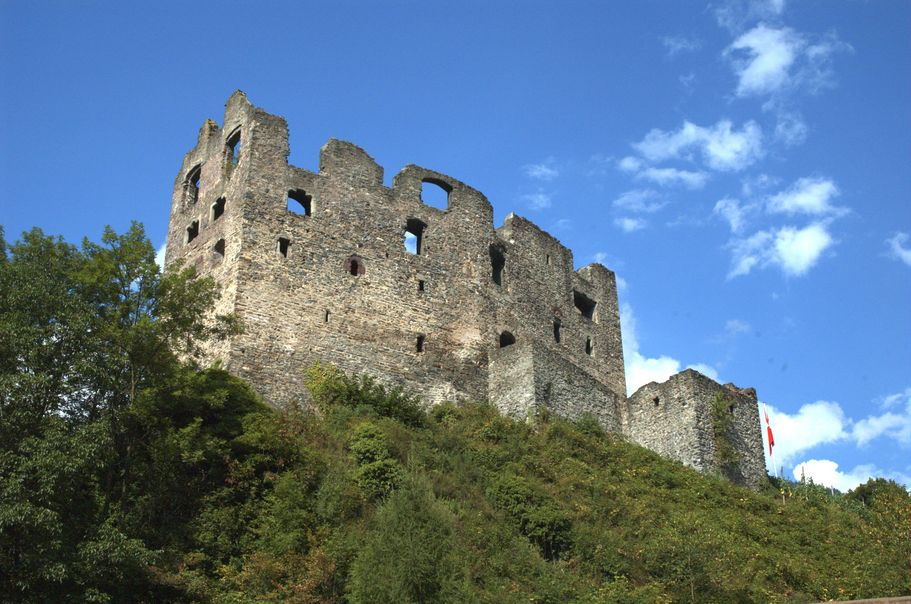
- Burg Gräpplang

Site information
- Type: hill castle, spur castle
- Code: CH-SG
- Condition: ruin

Location
- Coordinates: 47°06′10″N 09°19′56″E
- Height: 450 m above the sea

Site history
- Built: about 1100-1200

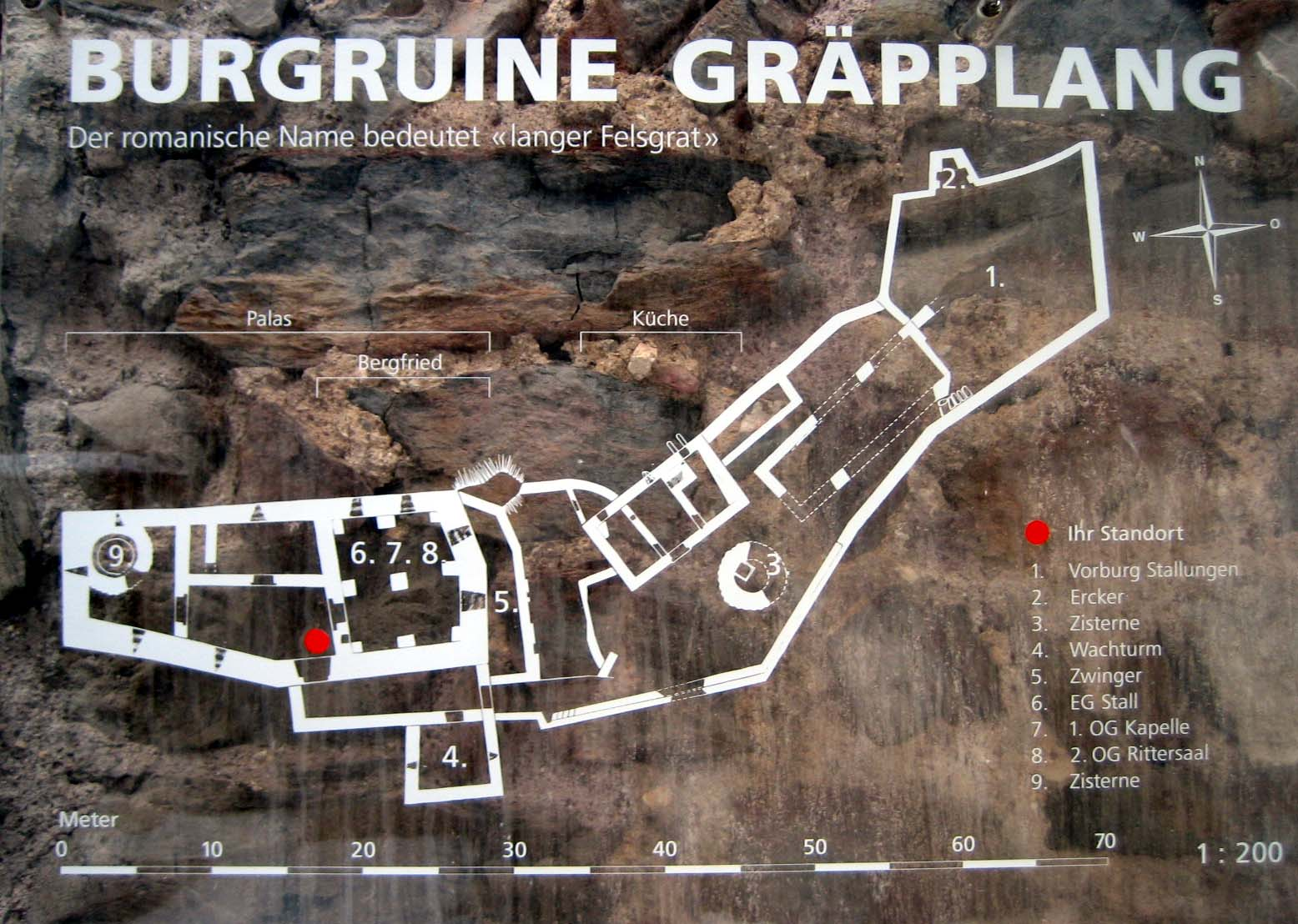
Layout of the castle

Gräpplang Castle is a castle in the municipality of Flums of the Canton of St. Gallen in Switzerland. It is a Swiss heritage site of national significance. Gräpplang is mentioned around the middle of the 13th century as the administrative seat of the Hochstift Chur, pledged to Ulrich von Flums in 1292 and sold to the Tschudi family in 1528, whose descendants remained owners until 1767.

== See also ==
- List of castles in Switzerland
