= Flums =

- Municipality
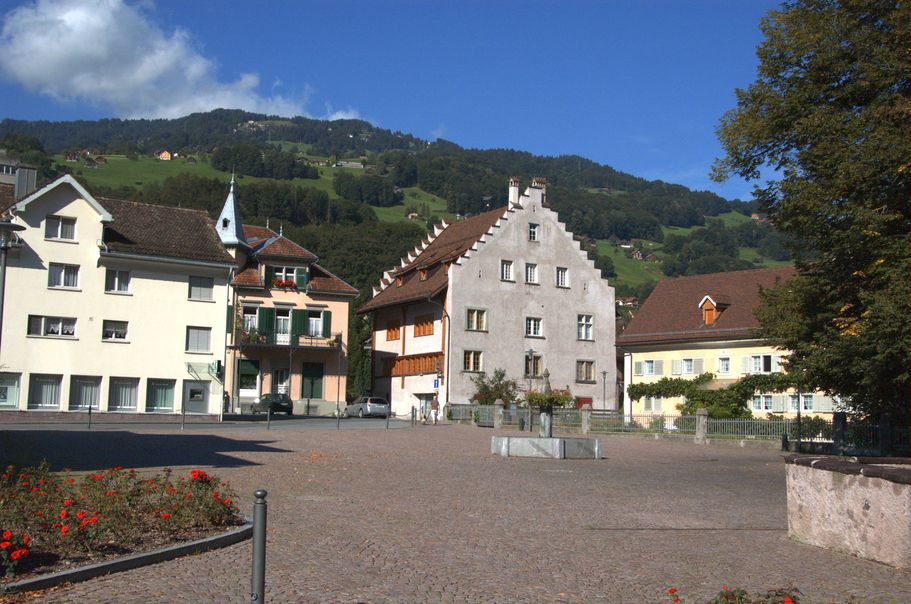

- Flag Coat of arms
- Location of Flums
- Location within Switzerland Location within Canton of St. Gallen
- Coordinates: 47°5′N 9°20′E
- Country: Switzerland
- Canton: St. Gallen
- District: Wahlkreis Sarganserland

Government
  - Mayor: Christoph Gull (since January 2013)

Area
  - Total: 75.03 km^{2} (28.97 sq mi)
- Elevation: 453 m (1,486 ft)

Population (December 2020)
  - Total: 4,964
  - Density: 66.16/km^{2} (171.4/sq mi)
- Time zone: UTC+01:00 (CET)
  - Summer (DST): UTC+02:00 (CEST)
- Postal code: 8890
- SFOS number: 3292
- ISO 3166 code: CH-SG
- Surrounded by: Engi (GL), Matt (GL), Mels, Quarten, Walenstadt, Wartau
- Website: www.flums.ch

Flums is a municipality in the Wahlkreis (constituency) of Sarganserland in the canton of St. Gallen in Switzerland.

It is close to a large shopping complex and also is the gateway to a large skiing resort called Flumserberg.

== History ==
Flums is first mentioned in 765 as Flumini.

== Geography ==
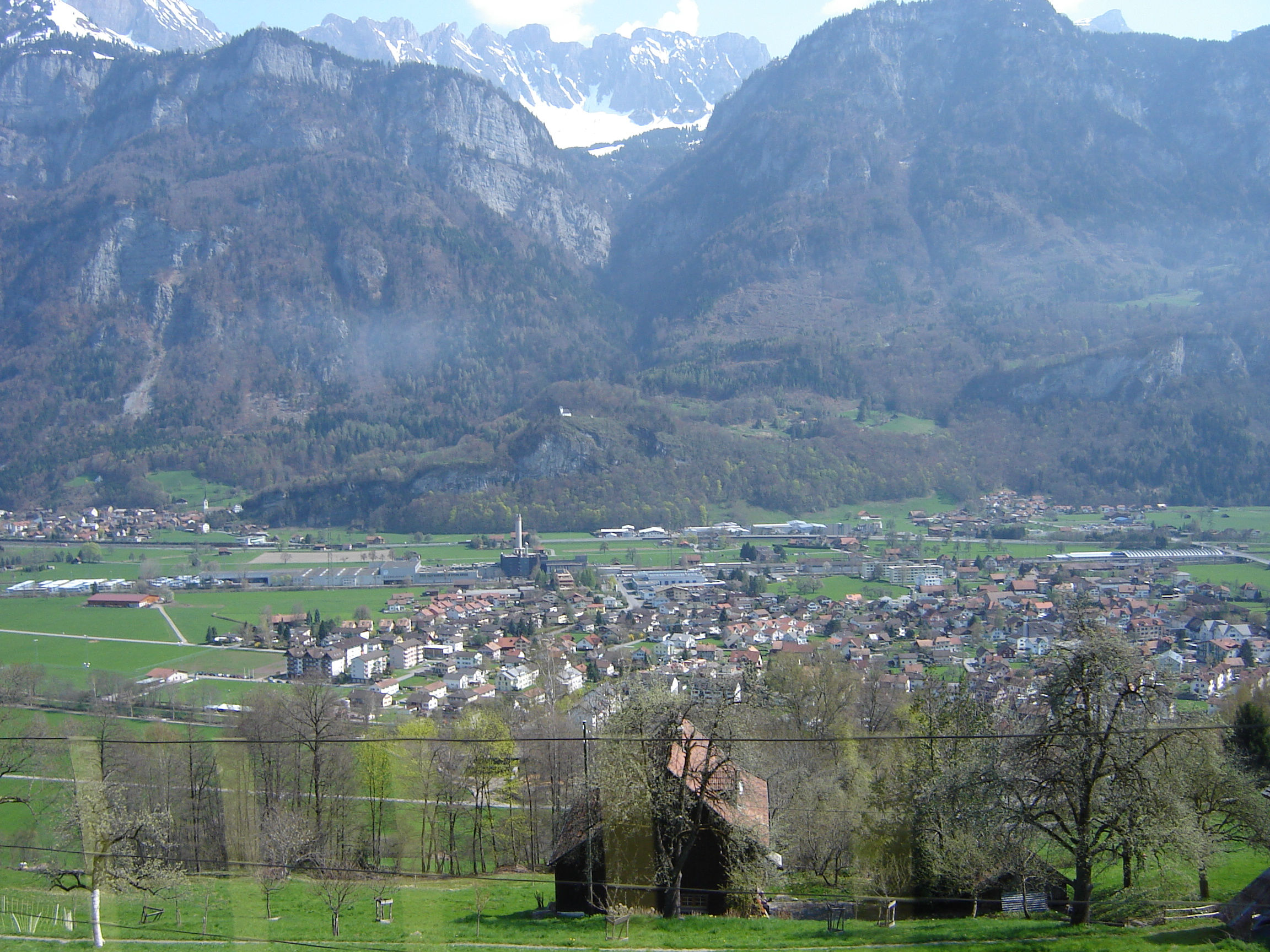
Flums

Aerial view from 400 m by Walter Mittelholzer (1919)

As of 2006, Flums has an area of 75.1 km^{2} (29.0 sq mi), of which 51.7% is used for agricultural purposes, 32.2% forested, 3.9% settled (buildings or roads), and 12.1% non-productive (rivers or lakes).

The municipality is located in the Sarganserland Wahlkreis. Until 2002 it was the capital of the Sargans district. In terms of area, it is the third largest municipality in the canton. Flums covers an area from the Schils valley to the border with the Canton of Glarus, part of the Flumserberge, part of the Seez valley, and the western slope of the Alvier chain. It consists of the village sections of Flums-Dorf, Grossberg, and Kleinberg.

== Coat of arms ==
The blazon of the municipal coat of arms is Trierced per fess Or, Sable and Argent.

== Demographics ==
As of 31 December 2020, Flums has a population of 4,964. In 2007, about 23.0% of the population was made up of foreign nationals. Of the foreign population as of 2000, 20 were from Germany, 126 from Italy, 688 from ex-Yugoslavia, 14 from Austria, 46 from Turkey, and 77 from other countries. Over the last 10 years the population has decreased at a rate of -0.3%. As of 2000, most of the population speaks German (86.9%), with Albanian being second most common (8.1%) and Italian being third (1.5%). As of 2000, of the Swiss national languages, 4,242 speak German, 9 speak French, 75 speak Italian, and 4 speak Romansh.

The age distribution in Flums is as of 2000; 691 children or 14.2% of the population are between 0 and 9 years old; 740 teenagers or 15.2% are between 10 and 19; 584 people or 12.0% are between 20 and 29 years old; 752 people or 15.4% are between 30 and 39; 629 people or 12.9% are between 40 and 49; 572 people or 11.7% are between 50 and 59; 395 people or 8.1% are between 60 and 69 years old; 332 people or 6.8% are between 70 and 79; 163 people or 3.3% are between 80 and 89; and 24 people or 0.5% are between 90 and 99.

In 2000 there were 493 persons (or 10.1% of the population) who were living alone in a private dwelling. There were 822 (or 16.8%) persons who were part of a couple (married or otherwise committed) without children, and 3,099 (or 63.5%) who were part of a couple with children. There were 220 (or 4.5%) people who lived in a single parent home, while there were 60 persons who were adult children living with one or both parents, 29 persons who lived in a household made up of relatives, 18 who lived household made up of unrelated persons, and 141 who were either institutionalized or lived in another type of collective housing.

In the 2007 federal election the most popular party was the SVP which received 52% of the vote. The next three most popular parties were the CVP (21.1%), the SP (10.9%), and the FDP (8.1%).

The entire Swiss population is generally well educated. In Flums about 57.1% of the population between age 25-64 have completed either non-mandatory upper secondary education or additional higher education (either university or a Fachhochschule). Out of the total population in Flums, as of 2000, the highest education level completed by 1,372 people (28.1% of the population) was Primary, while 1,465 (30.0%) have completed Secondary, 298 (6.1%) have attended a Tertiary school, and 274 (5.6%) are not in school. The remainder did not answer this question.

The historical population is given in the following table:

year	population
1739	1,864
1850	2,577
1900	3,567
1950	4,833
1970	4,474
2000	4,882

== Heritage sites of national significance ==
The Gräpplang Castle (a prehistoric hilltop settlement and a ruined medieval castle), the Chapel of St. Jakob, and the catholic Church of St. Justus are listed as Swiss heritage sites of national significance.

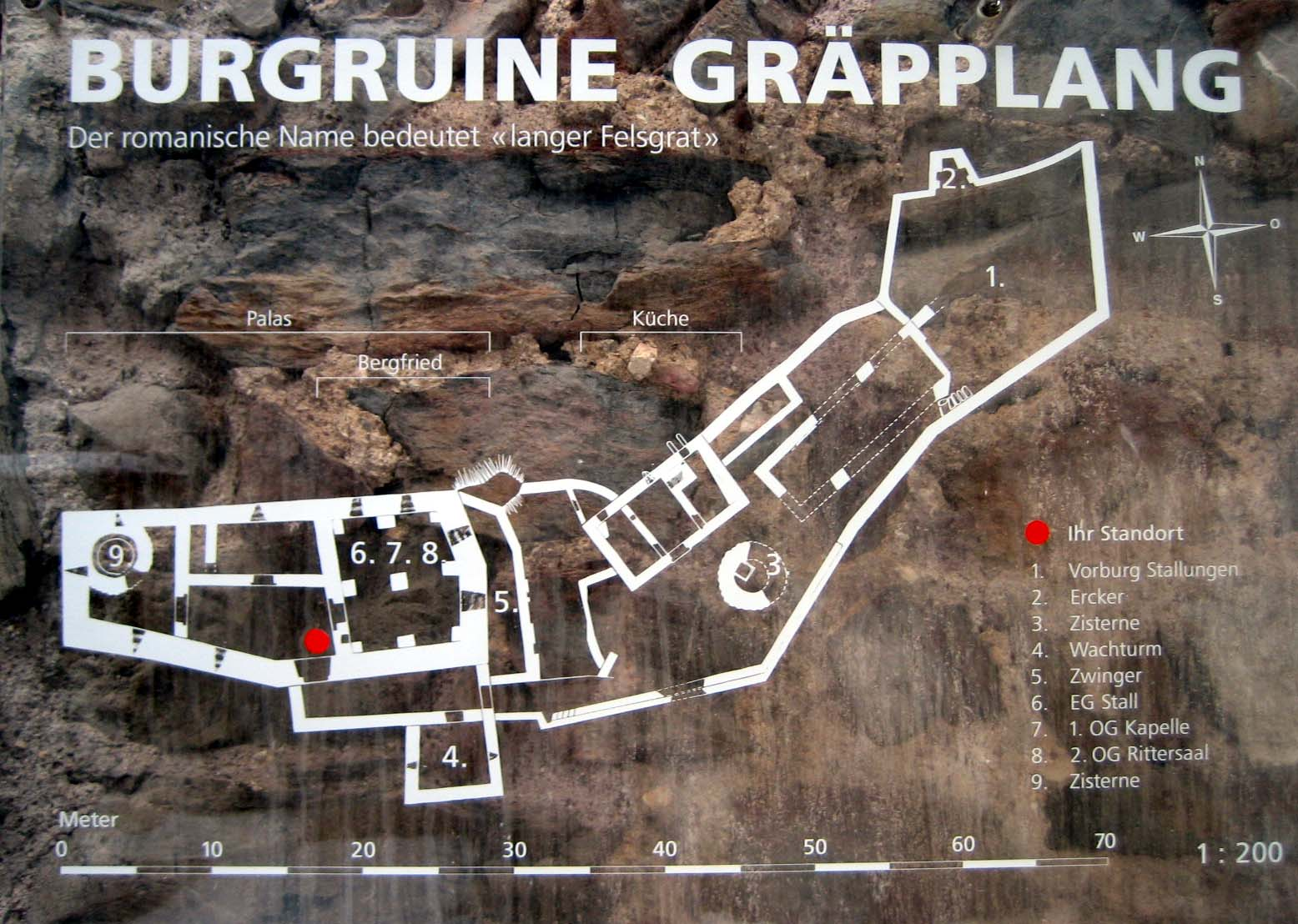
Floorplan of Castle Gräpplang

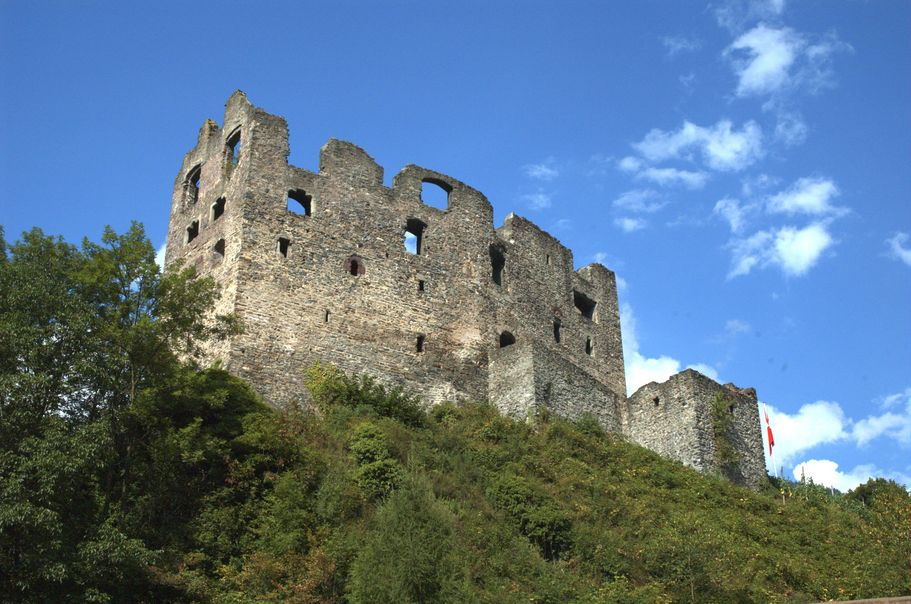
View of the castle ruins

== Transportation ==
The municipality is located on the A3 motorway.

== Economy ==
As of 2007, Flums had an unemployment rate of 1.04%. As of 2005, there were 339 people employed in the primary economic sector and about 152 businesses involved in this sector. 996 people were employed in the secondary sector with 65 businesses. 861 people were employed in the tertiary sector, with 149 businesses. As of October 2009 the average unemployment rate was 3.9%. There were 354 businesses in the municipality of which 68 were involved in the secondary sector of the economy while 147 were involved in the third. As of 2000 there were 1,403 residents who worked in the municipality, while 945 residents worked outside Flums and 664 people commuted into the municipality for work.

== Religion ==
From the 2000 census, 3,480 or 71.3% are Roman Catholic, while 380 or 7.8% belonged to the Swiss Reformed Church. Of the rest of the population, there were 5 individuals (or about 0.10% of the population) who belonged to the Christian Catholic faith, 92 individuals (or about 1.88% of the population) who belonged to the Orthodox Church, and 30 individuals (or about 0.61% of the population) who belonged to another Christian church. There were 614 (or about 12.58% of the population) who were Islamic, 5 individuals (or about 0.10% of the population) who belonged to another church not listed on the census, 139 (or about 2.85% of the population) belonged to no church and were agnostic or atheist, and 137 individuals (or about 2.81% of the population) did not answer the question.

== Notable people ==
- Paul Kutter (1863–1937) was one of Luxembourg City's early photographers, born in Flums
