= Sargans Castle =

Castle in Sargans, Switzerland

- Schloss Sargans
- Sargans
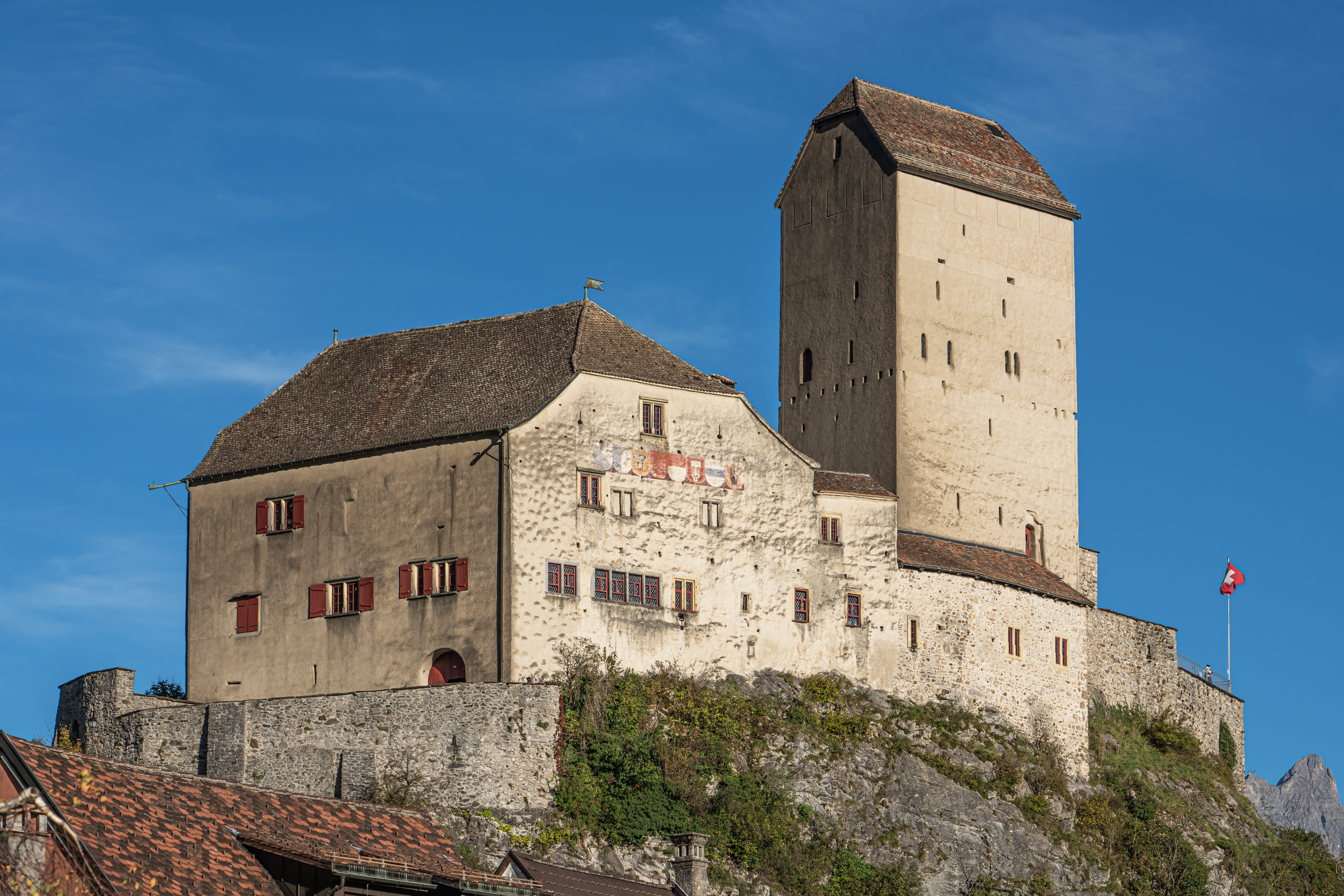
- Sargans Castle from the south-west

Site information
- Code: CH-SG
- Condition: museum

Location
- Location within Canton of St. Gallen Location within Switzerland
- Coordinates: 47°03′01″N 9°26′14″E
- Height: 535 m above the sea

Site history
- Built: 12th century

Sargans Castle is a castle in the municipality of Sargans of the Canton of St. Gallen in Switzerland. It is a Swiss heritage site of national significance.

The castle was the seat of the counts of Werdenberg-Sargans in the 13th century. Since 1899, it has been run by the local church and now houses the Sarganserland museum.

== History ==
Beginning in 982 the Sargans region was part of the lands of the Counts of Bregenz. In 1160, the male line of the Counts of Bregenz died out. Count palatine Hugo of Tübingen inherited most of their lands, through his wife Elisabeth. His son, Hugo, inherited the Bregenz lands around Lake Constance, including Sargans. This Hugo, who adopted the name Montfort und Werdenberg built or expanded Sargans Castle before his death in 1228. Excavations around the oldest part of the castle show that there was an earlier fort or castle, but nothing is known about that building. Hugo built the large bergfried, expanded the walls to the west and may have built a palas on that side of the castle.

In the mid-13th century the Montfort und Werdenberg lands were divided between Hugo of Werdenberg-Heiligenberg and his brother Hartmann of Werdenberg-Sargans. Hartmann took up residence in the castle and probably expanded the palas. The castle was first mentioned in 1282. Over the following century the wealth and lands of the Counts of Werdenberg-Sargans were divided over and over again between descendants. By the last 14th century, Count Johann I ruled over a small and poor county under the Habsburgs. In the Battle of Näfels in 1388, the count commanded a wing of the Austrian army that was supposed to cross the Kerenzerberg Pass. However, when he saw the threatened destruction of the main Austrian army, he fled back over the pass. The cost of the war, as well as other expenses forced Johann I to sell the castle and village to Leopold of Austria.

== See also ==
- List of castles in Switzerland
