= Fründsberg Castle =

Castle in Goldingen, Switzerland

Coordinates: 47°17′01″N 8°56′29″E

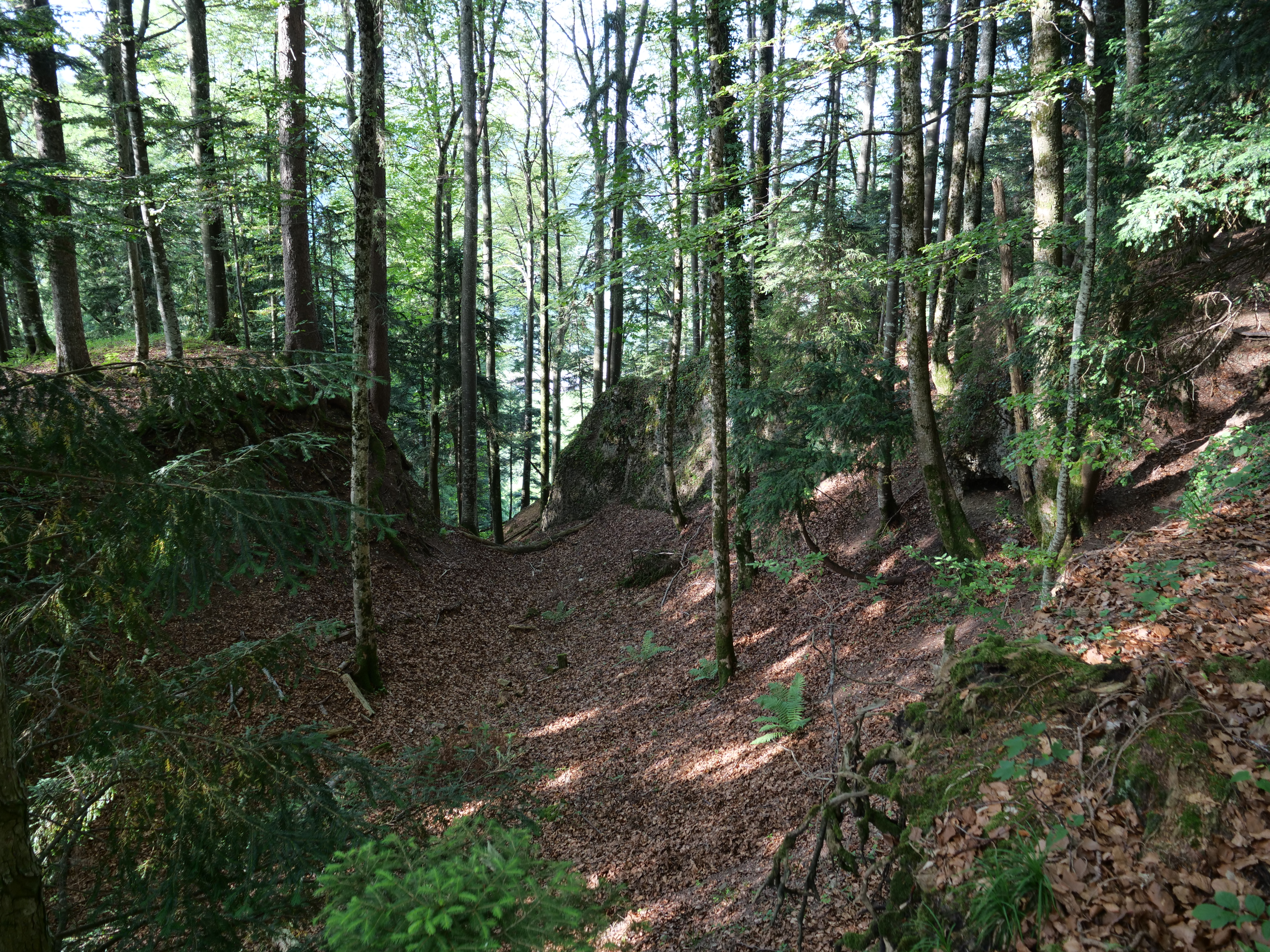
Fründsberg Castle moat

Fründsberg Castle is a castle in the municipality of Goldingen of the Canton of St. Gallen in Switzerland. It is a Swiss heritage site of national significance.

== See also ==
- List of castles in Switzerland
