= Sargans =

- Municipality
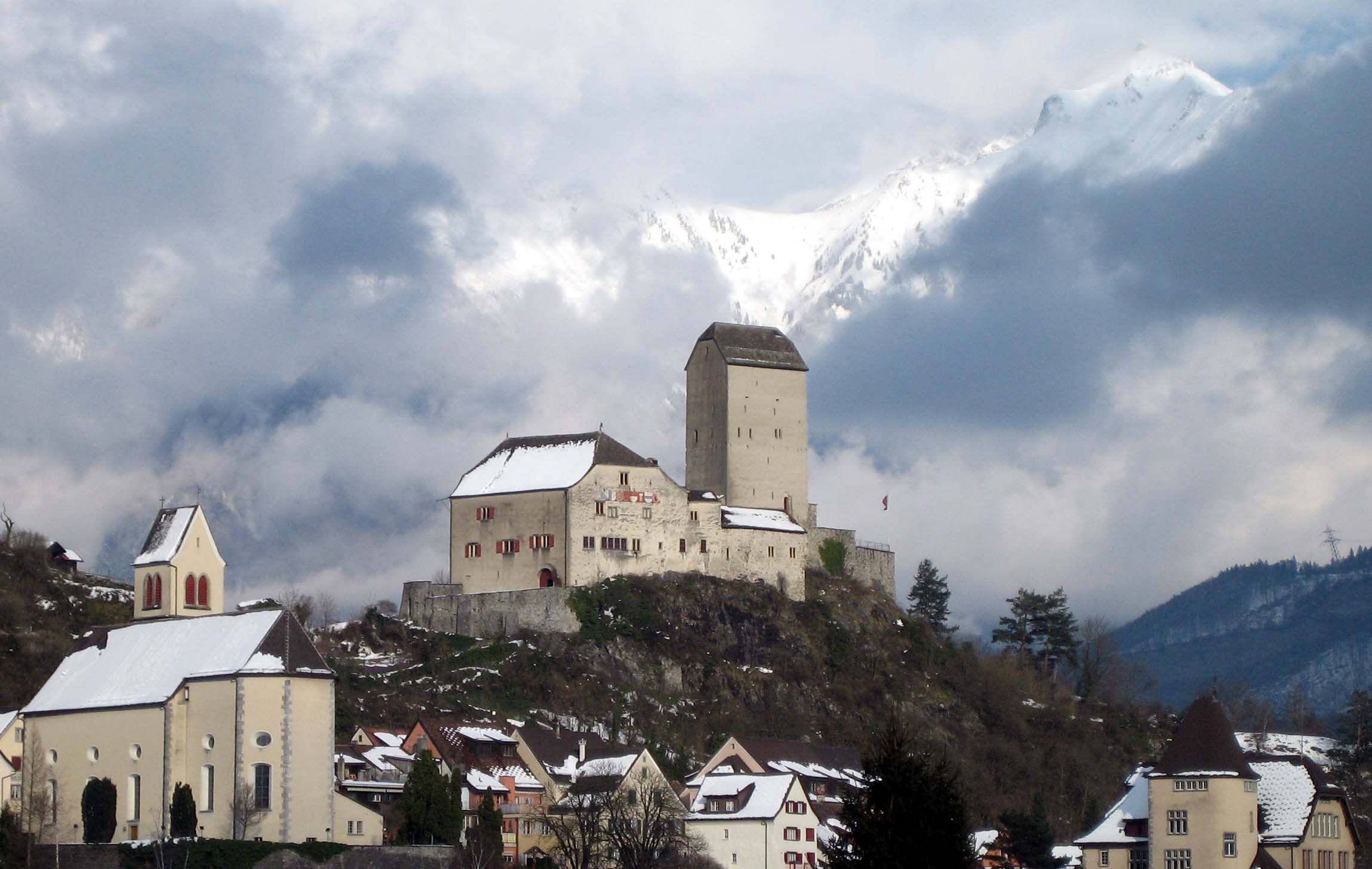

- Coat of arms
- Location of Sargans
- Location within Switzerland Location within Canton of St. Gallen
- Coordinates: 47°02′N 9°26′E
- Country: Switzerland
- Canton: St. Gallen
- District: Wahlkreis Sarganserland

Government
  - Mayor: Jörg Tanner

Area
  - Total: 9.48 km^{2} (3.66 sq mi)
- Elevation: 480 m (1,570 ft)

Population (December 2020)
  - Total: 6,213
  - Density: 655/km^{2} (1,700/sq mi)
- Time zone: UTC+01:00 (CET)
  - Summer (DST): UTC+02:00 (CEST)
- Postal code: 7320
- SFOS number: 3296
- ISO 3166 code: CH-SG
- Surrounded by: Balzers (LI), Fläsch (GR), Mels, Vilters-Wangs, Wartau
- Website: sargans.ch

Sargans (Swiss Standard German pronunciation: [ˌsarˈgans]) is a municipality in the Wahlkreis (constituency) of Sarganserland in the canton of St. Gallen in Switzerland.

Sargans is known for its castle, which dates from before the founding of the Swiss Confederation in 1291. Sargans was also a County of the Holy Roman Empire; see County of Sargans.

== History ==
There are traces of Neolithic settlement in the area. A significant Roman-era estate was destroyed by an Alamannic incursion in c. 270. Sargans remained part of Lower Raetia in the early medieval period, with gradual displacement of Rumantsch by Alemannic speakers during the high medieval period. A church dedicated to Saint Cassian is mentioned in the 9th century. Sargans was part of the territory of the county of Werdenberg from the 12th century, with a separate line of Werdenberg-Sargans established in the later 13th century. The castle was presumably first built in the 12th century and is first mentioned in 1282. The town of Sargans grew around the castle in the 13th century.

Sargans is mentioned as Senegaunis in the 11th century. An earlier mention as de Senegaune, ostensibly dated to 765, survives in a 16th-century copy. In 1248 it was mentioned as Sanegans, in 1264 as Sangans and in 1332 as Santgans. The modern spelling dates to the 16th century. The etymology of the name is unknown; San- seems to have changed to Sar- under the influence of the hydronym Saar. A popular etymology connecting the name Sargans to "goose" (German Gans) may date to as early as the 15th century.

From 1406, a combined fortification of the town and the castle was built. In 1445, the town, but not the castle, was captured and burned by the Swiss Confederacy. The town was given limited rights of self-government in 1456 when the count agreed to select a Schultheiss out of a list of three candidates to be submitted by the burghers. In 1483, count Jürg of Werdenberg-Sargans was forced to sell the county to the Swiss Confederacy for 15,000 Rhenish guilder. From this time until 1798, the castle was the seat of the Swiss reeves. The town burned down again in 1490. In 1501, the Swiss Confederacy confirmed the city rights of Sargans and granted the right for a weekly market.

The municipal coat of arms goes back to the 15th century. It is canting, showing a goose based on the folk etymology for the name Sargans. The historical coat of arms of the county of Sargans was azure three mullets or.

In 1798, Sargans became part of the Mels district of the Canton of Linth in the Helvetic Republic. It was incorporated into the Canton of St. Gallen in 1803. Most of the town was destroyed by fire in 1811.

Sargans is at the juncture of the railway lines connecting Chur with Zürich and with Lake Constance, built in 1859. The line to Vienna was added in 1884. The Saar was first canalised in 1858 for the construction of the railway station and again in 1978 for the construction of the A3-A13 motorway junction. Sargans remained mostly unaffected by industrialisation; the Gonzen iron ore mine was closed down in 1966.

== Geography ==
Aerial view from 200 m by Walter Mittelholzer (1919)

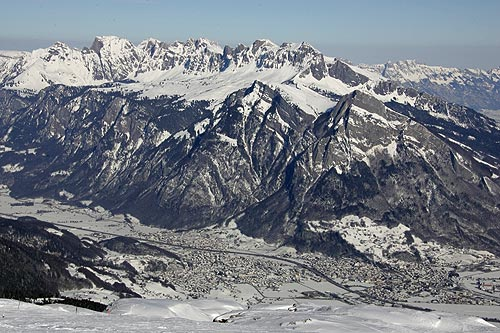
View from Mt. Laufböden toward Mels and Sargans

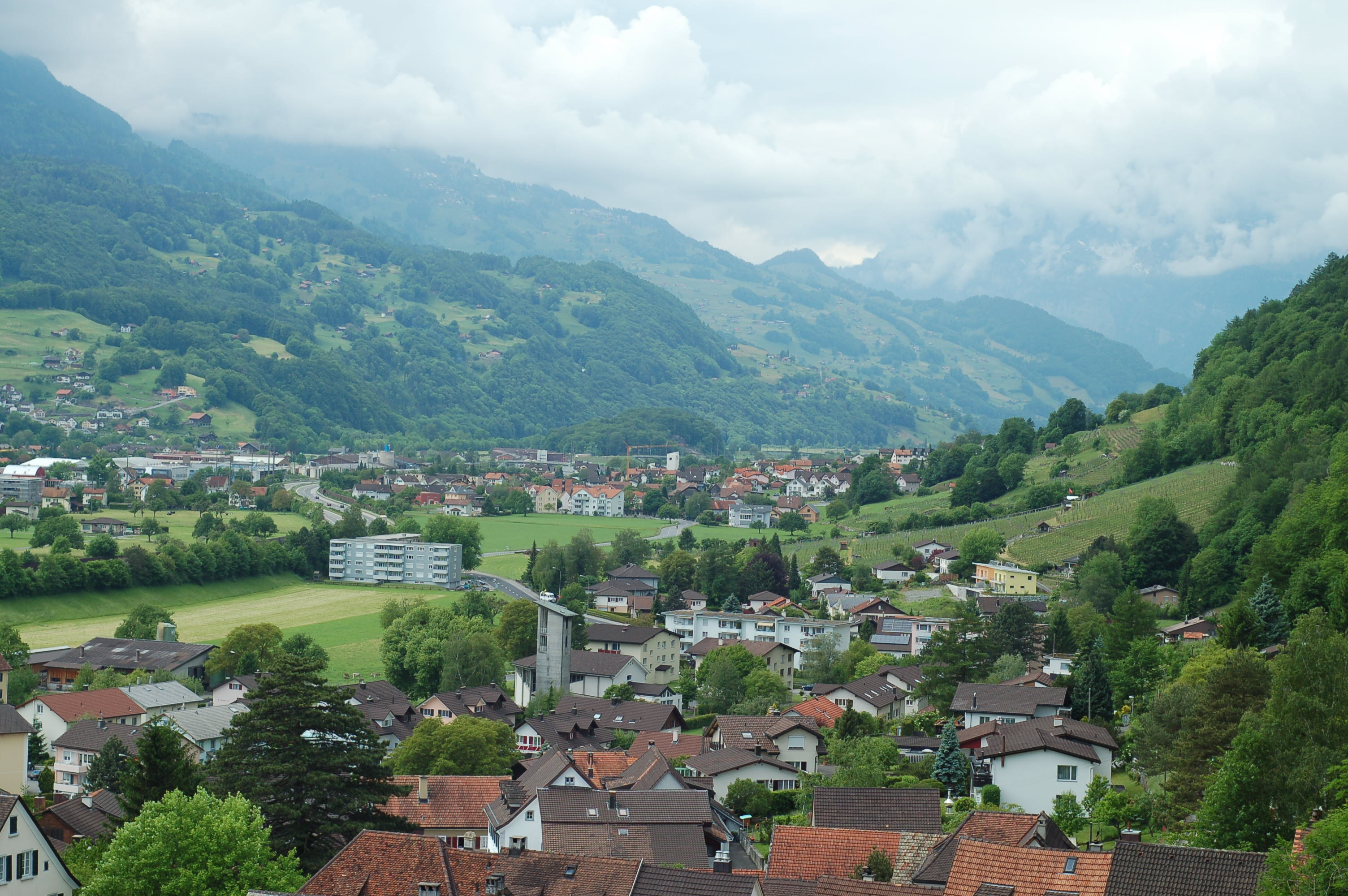
Sargans from Schloss Sargans

Sargans has an area, as of 2006, of 9.5 km^{2} (3.7 sq mi). Of this area, 38.4% is used for agricultural purposes, while 35.2% is forested. Of the rest of the land, 20.2% is settled (buildings or roads) and the remainder (6.2%) is non-productive (rivers or lakes).

The municipality is the capital of the Sarganserland Wahlkreis. It is located at the foot of the Mt Gonzen. The eastern border of the municipality is the Rhine river and Liechtenstein. As it is located at the intersection of the Rhine and Seez valleys, Sargans has long been important in both a strategic and commercial sense. It consists of the village of Sargans and the hamlets of Vild, Ratell, Prod, Splee, Riet, Farb, Töbeli and Schwefelbad.

== Transport ==
The municipality is located on the A3 motorway. Sargans is an important regional transportation node. Trains heading north toward St. Gallen, east toward Chur and Ticino, and toward Austria, all pass through Sargans. Buses heading toward Liechtenstein also leave Sargans.

== Demographics ==
Sargans has a population (as of 31 December 2020) of 6,213. As of 2007, about 22.0% of the population was made up of foreign nationals. Of the foreign population, (as of 2000), 34 are from Germany, 126 are from Italy, 432 are from former Yugoslavia, 38 are from Austria, 50 are from Turkey, and 228 are from other countries. Over the last 10 years the population has grown at a rate of 7.3%. Most of the population (as of 2000) speaks German (87.0%), with Serbo-Croatian being second most common ( 3.2%) and Italian being third ( 2.1%). Of the Swiss national languages (as of 2000), 4,146 speak German, 18 people speak French, 102 people speak Italian, and 22 people speak Romansh.

The age distribution, as of 2000, in Sargans is; 522 children or 11.0% of the population are between 0 and 9 years old and 592 teenagers or 12.4% are between 10 and 19. Of the adult population, 594 people or 12.5% of the population are between 20 and 29 years old. 749 people or 15.7% are between 30 and 39, 738 people or 15.5% are between 40 and 49, and 610 people or 12.8% are between 50 and 59. The senior population distribution is 456 people or 9.6% of the population are between 60 and 69 years old, 339 people or 7.1% are between 70 and 79, there are 139 people or 2.9% who are between 80 and 89, and there are 26 people or 0.5% who are between 90 and 99.

In 2000 there were 654 persons (or 13.7% of the population) who were living alone in a private dwelling. There were 1,108 (or 23.3%) persons who were part of a couple (married or otherwise committed) without children, and 2,555 (or 53.6%) who were part of a couple with children. There were 267 (or 5.6%) people who lived in single parent home, while there are 27 persons who were adult children living with one or both parents, 25 persons who lived in a household made up of relatives, 19 who lived household made up of unrelated persons, and 110 who are either institutionalized or live in another type of collective housing.

In the 2007 federal election the most popular party was the SVP which received 35.2% of the vote. The next three most popular parties were the CVP (21.7%), the SP (19.4%) and the FDP (13.5%).

In Sargans about 68.8% of the population (between age 25–64) have completed either non-mandatory upper secondary education or additional higher education (either university or a Fachhochschule). Out of the total population in Sargans, as of 2000, the highest education level completed by 1,079 people (22.6% of the population) was Primary, while 1,870 (39.2%) have completed their secondary education, 477 (10.0%) have attended a Tertiary school, and 236 (5.0%) are not in school. The remainder did not answer this question.

The historical population is given in the following table:

year	population
1800	680
1850	907
1900	931
1950	2,075
1960	2,571
1970	4,058
2000	4,765

== Religion ==
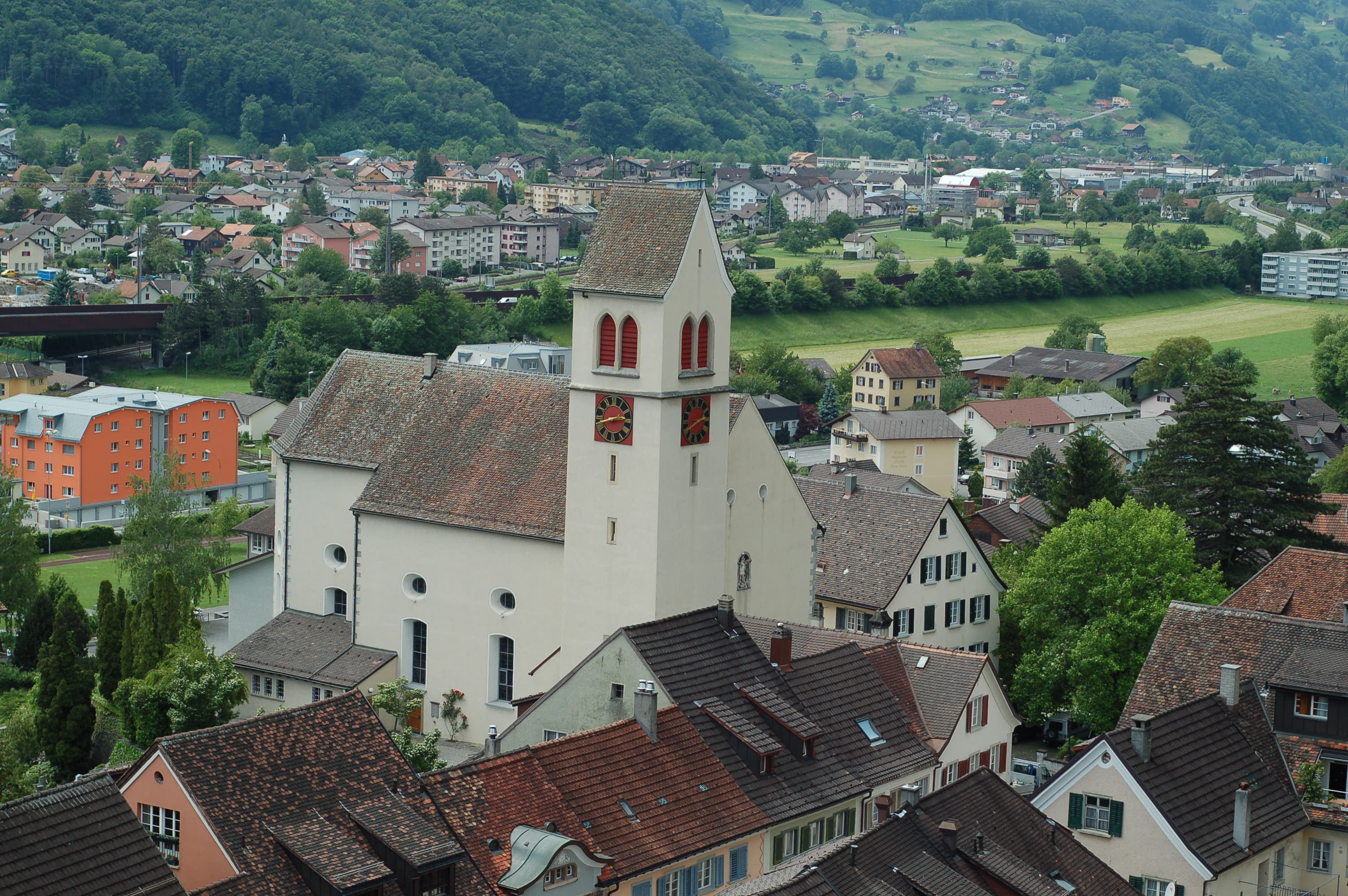
Village church in Sargans

From the 2000 census, 3,001 or 63.0% are Roman Catholic, while 843 or 17.7% belonged to the Swiss Reformed Church. Of the rest of the population, there are 4 individuals (or about 0.08% of the population) who belong to the Christian Catholic faith, there are 132 individuals (or about 2.77% of the population) who belong to the Orthodox Church, and there are 53 individuals (or about 1.11% of the population) who belong to another Christian church. There are 4 individuals (or about 0.08% of the population) who are Jewish, and 265 (or about 5.56% of the population) who are Islamic. There are 75 individuals (or about 1.57% of the population) who belong to another church (not listed on the census), 218 (or about 4.58% of the population) belong to no church, are agnostic or atheist, and 170 individuals (or about 3.57% of the population) did not answer the question.

== Economy ==
As of 2007, Sargans had an unemployment rate of 1.75%. As of 2005, there were 79 people employed in the primary economic sector and about 29 businesses involved in this sector. 1,171 people are employed in the secondary sector and there are 58 businesses in this sector. 1,791 people are employed in the tertiary sector, with 218 businesses in this sector.

As of October 2009 the average unemployment rate was 3.9%. There were 310 businesses in the municipality of which 57 were involved in the secondary sector of the economy while 227 were involved in the third.

As of 2000 there were 994 residents who worked in the municipality, while 1,493 residents worked outside Sargans and 1,893 people commuted into the municipality for work.

== Heritage sites of national significance ==
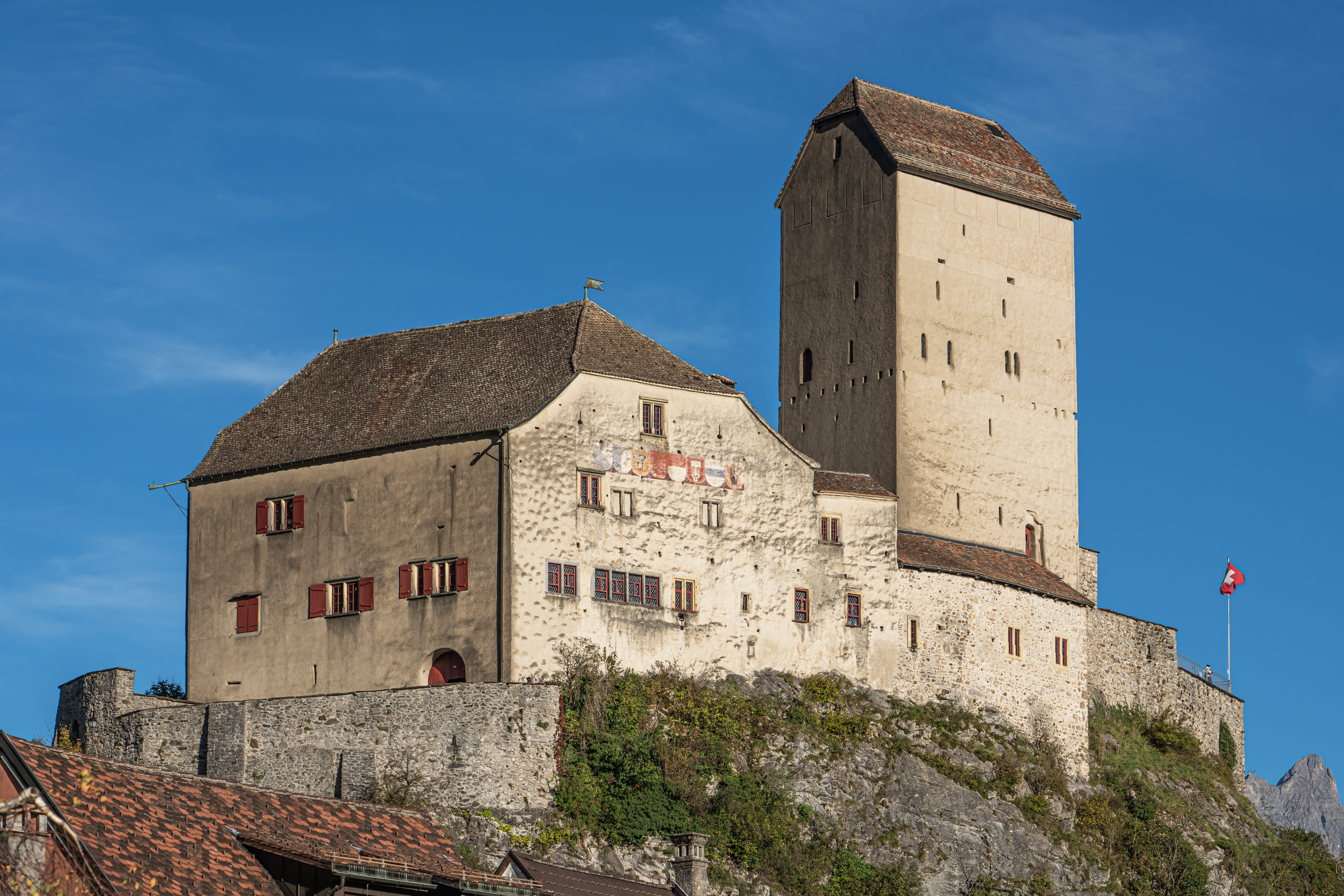
Schloss Sargans

Both the local mining operation and Schloss Sargans are listed as Swiss heritage sites of national significance.

== Notable people ==
- Josef Anton Henne (1798 in Sargans – 1870) a Swiss historian and politician active during the formation of the modern Swiss state.
- Alexander Hug (born 1975) a Swiss ski mountaineer, lives in Sargans

== Weather ==
Sargans has an average of 142.2 days of rain or snow per year and on average receives 1,325 mm (52.2 in) of precipitation. The wettest month is August during which time Sargans receives an average of 153 mm (6.0 in) of rain or snow. During this month there is precipitation for an average of 14.3 days. The month with the most days of precipitation is June, with an average of 14.5, but with only 136 mm (5.4 in) of rain or snow. The driest month of the year is October with an average of 82 mm (3.2 in) of precipitation over 14.3 days.
