= Zuckenriet Castle =

Castle in Niederhelfenschwil, Switzerland

Coordinates: 47°29′19″N 9°09′49″E

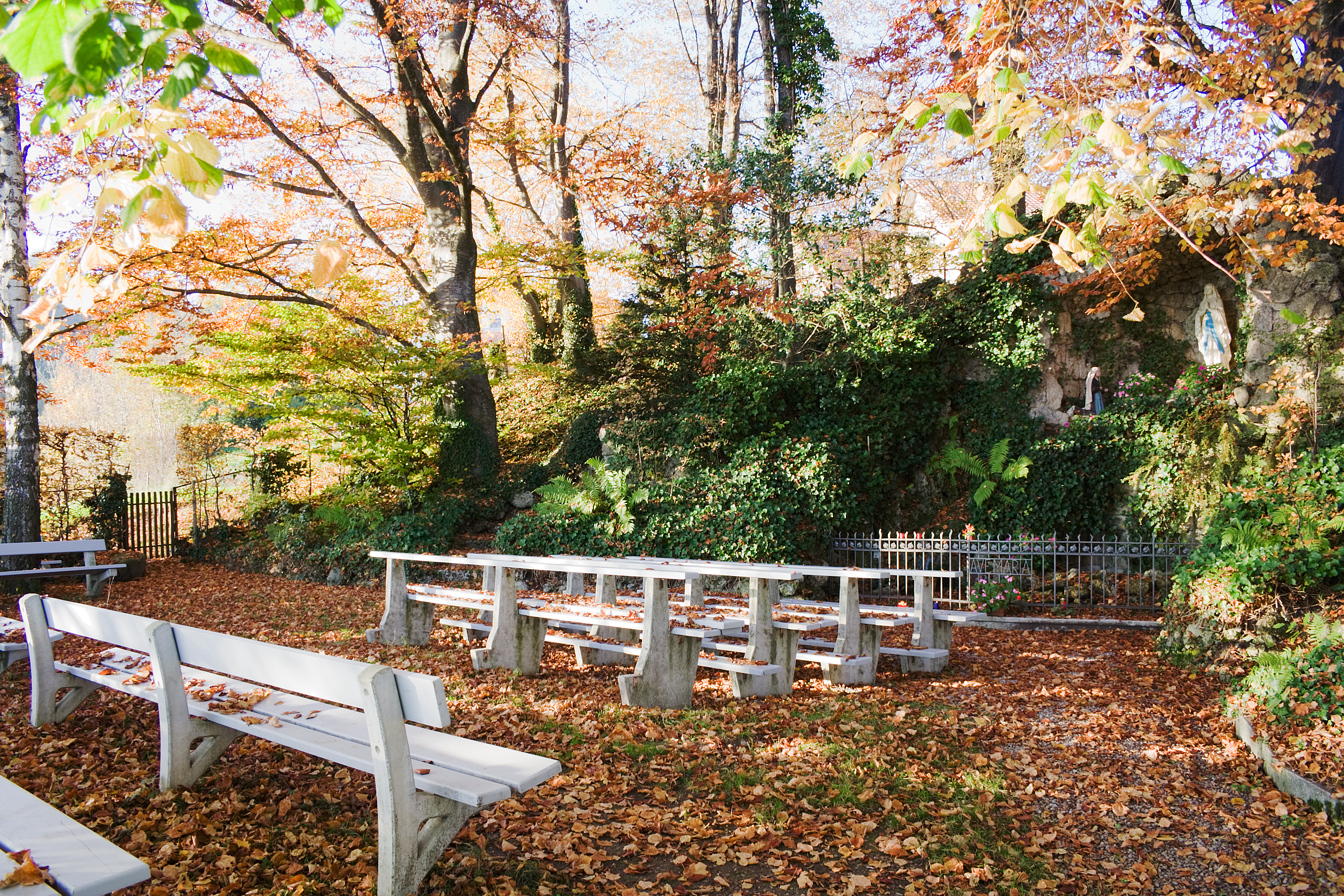
Grotto underneath Zuckenriet Castle

Zuckenriet Castle is a castle in the municipality of Niederhelfenschwil of the Canton of St. Gallen in Switzerland. It is a Swiss heritage site of national significance.

== See also ==
- List of castles in Switzerland
