= Wichenstein Castle =

Castle in Oberriet, Switzerland

Coordinates: 47°19′38″N 9°33′14″E

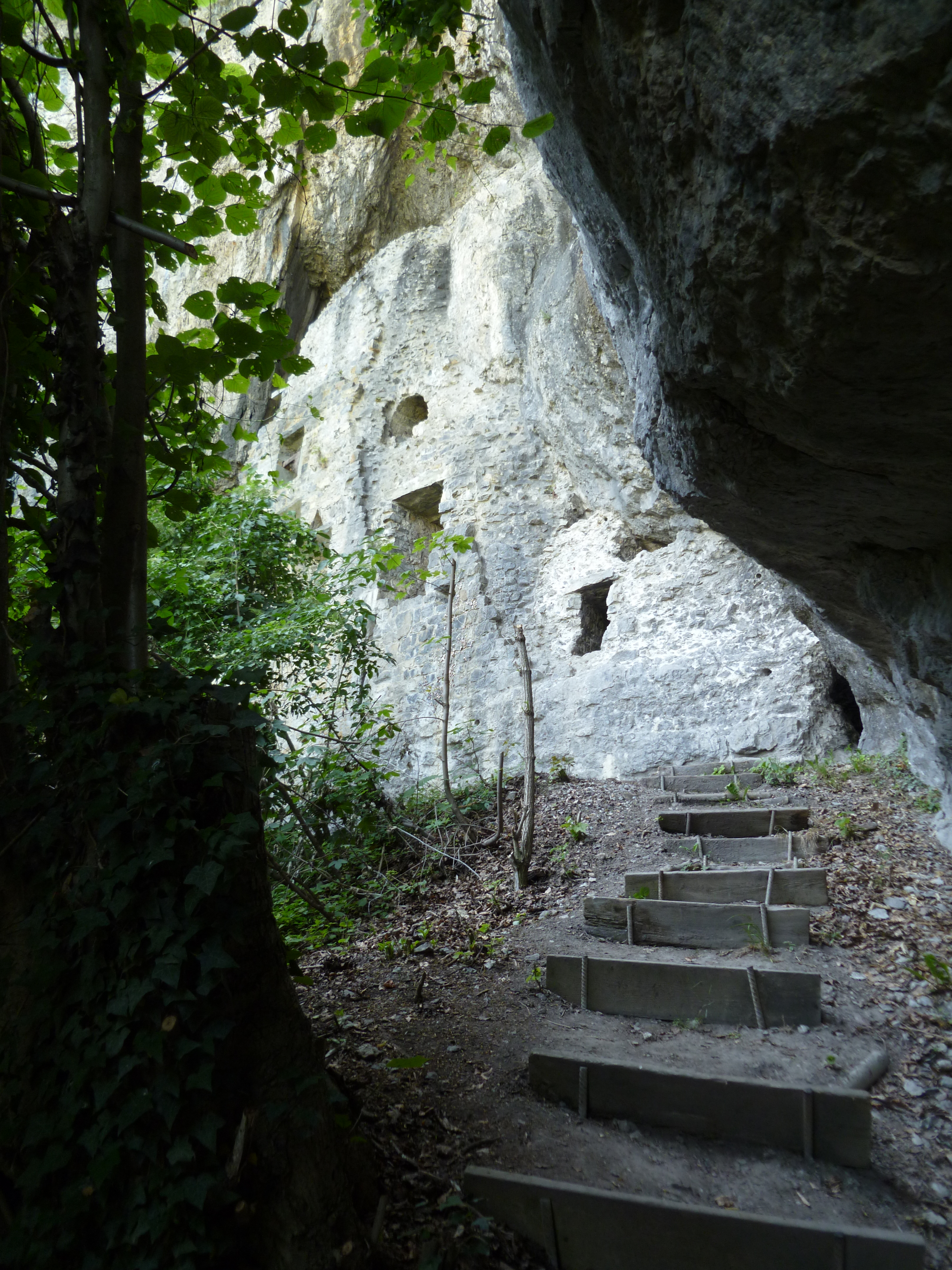
Exterior view of Wichenstein Castle

Wichenstein Castle is a castle in the municipality of Oberriet of the Canton of St. Gallen in Switzerland. It is a Swiss heritage site of national significance.

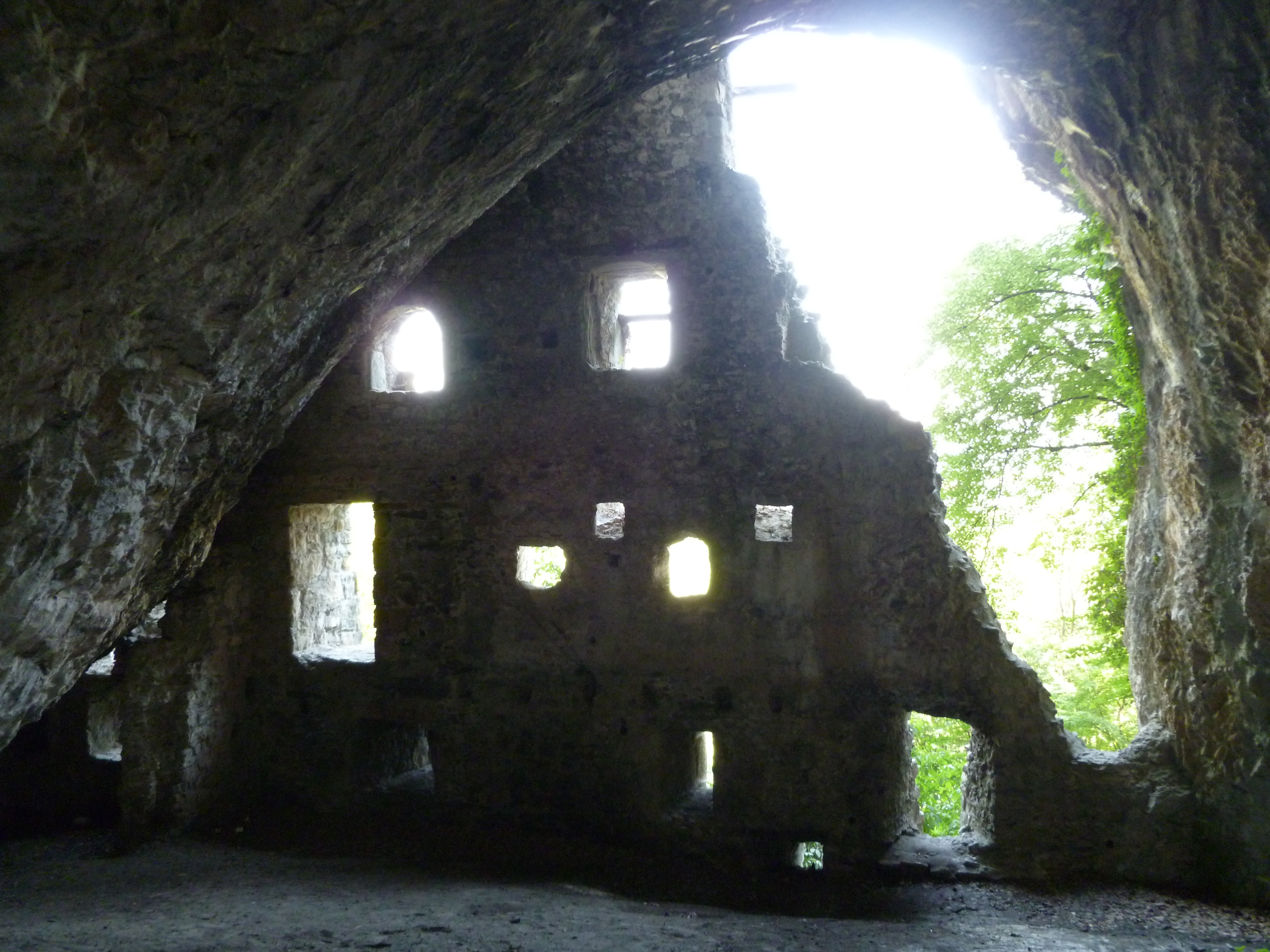
View of interior side of the castle wall

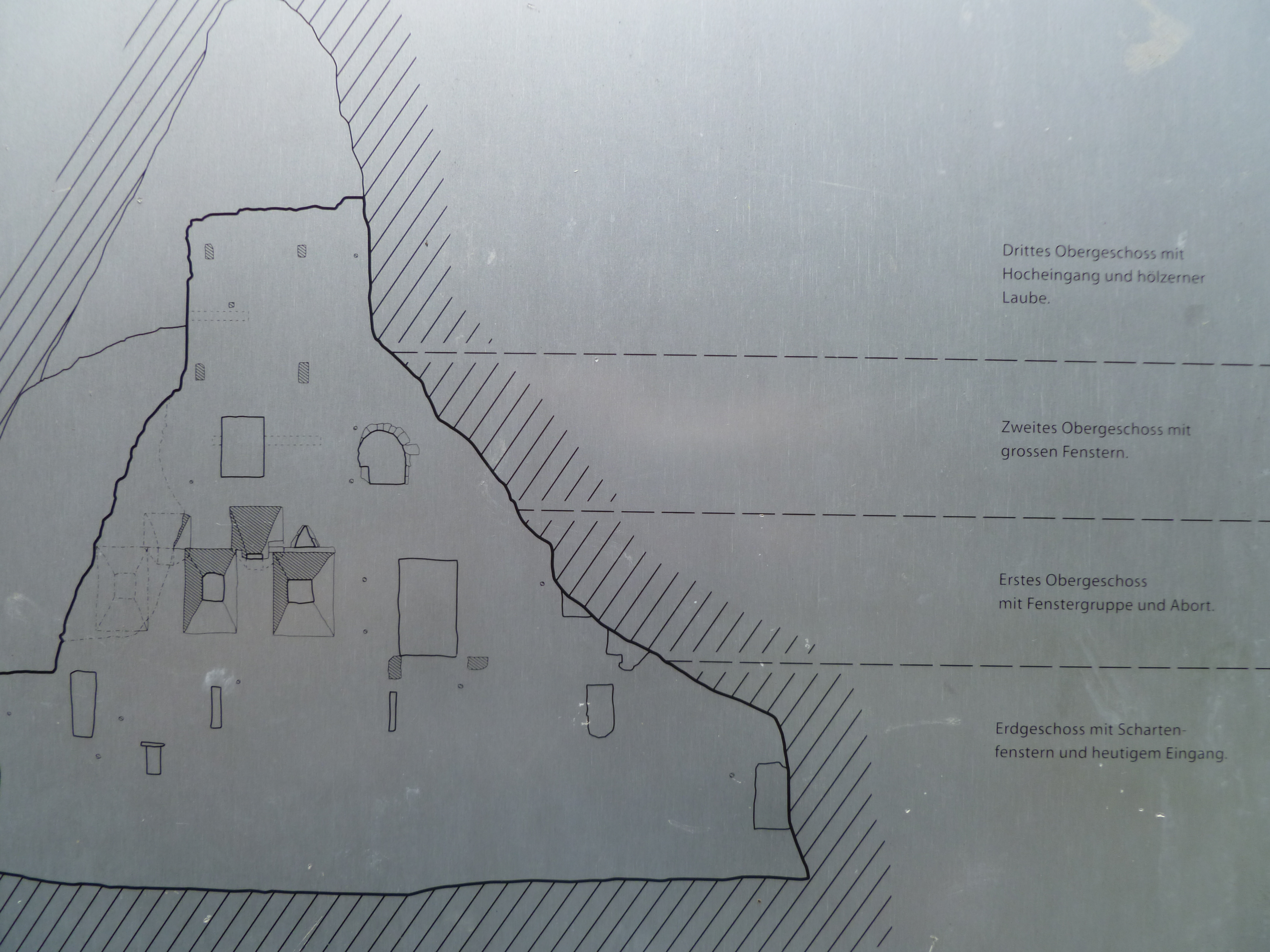
Outlining of the castle structure with floors

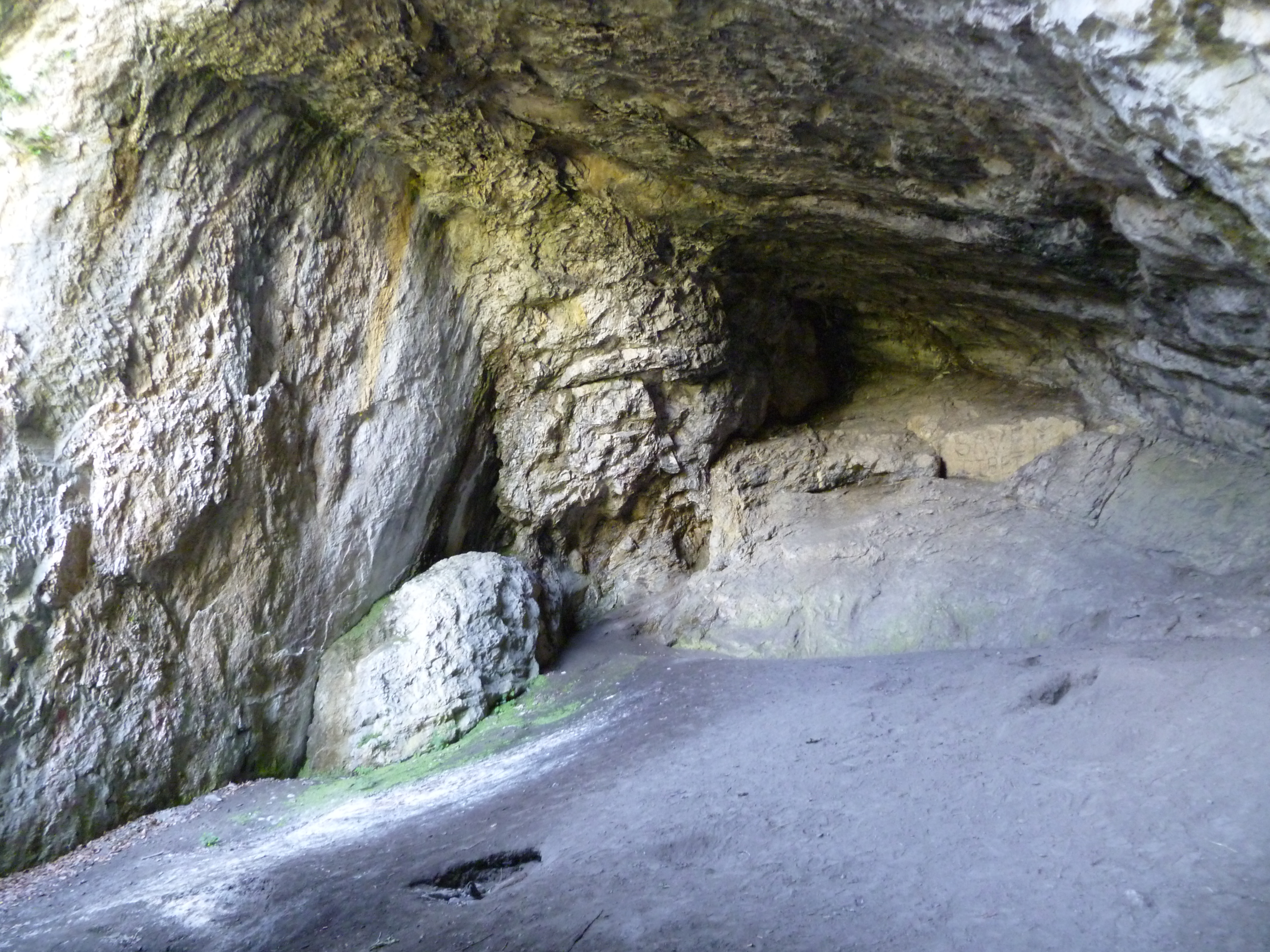
Cave behind the castle wall, in which the housing and storage was

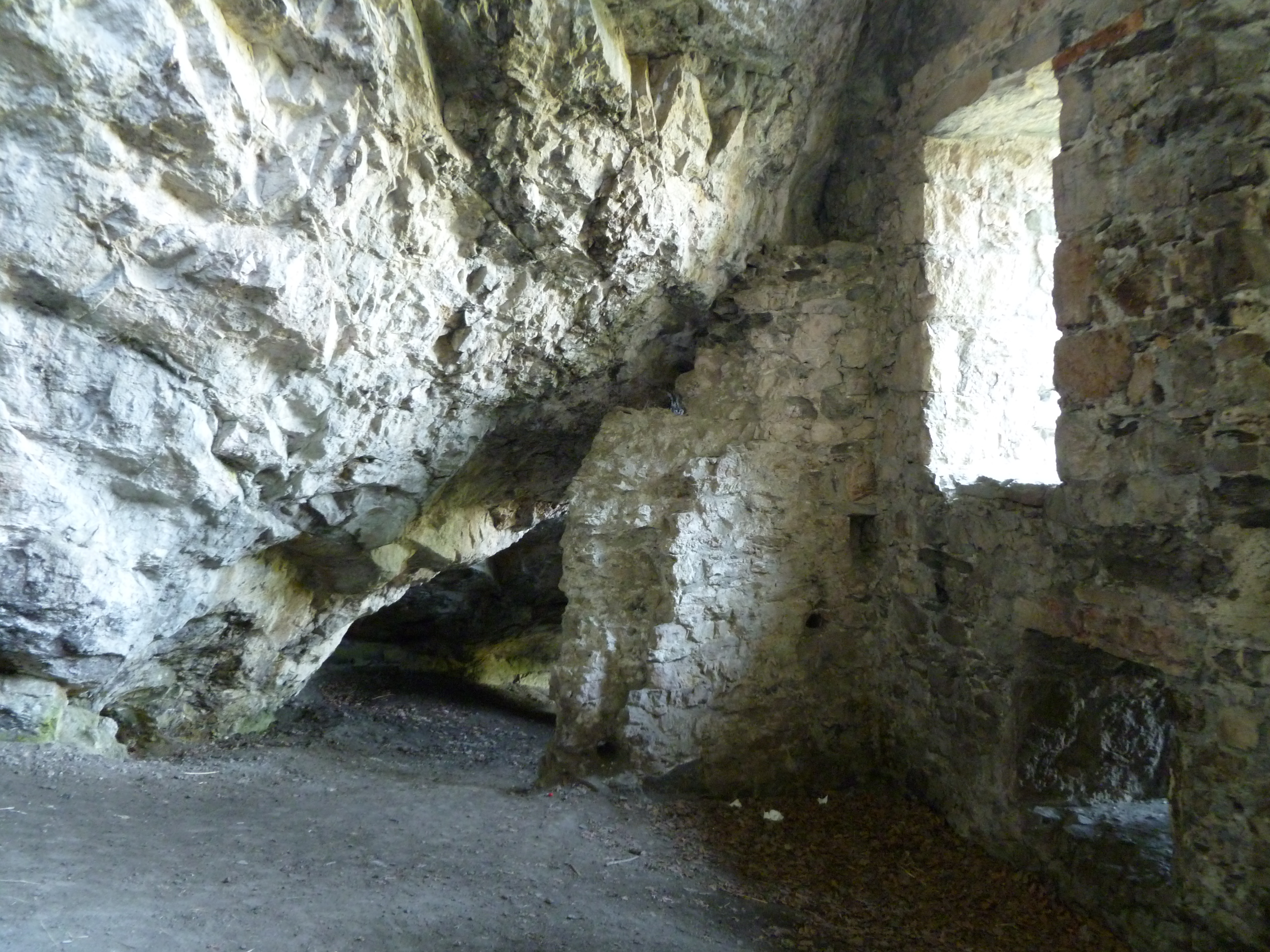
View to the current entrance niche

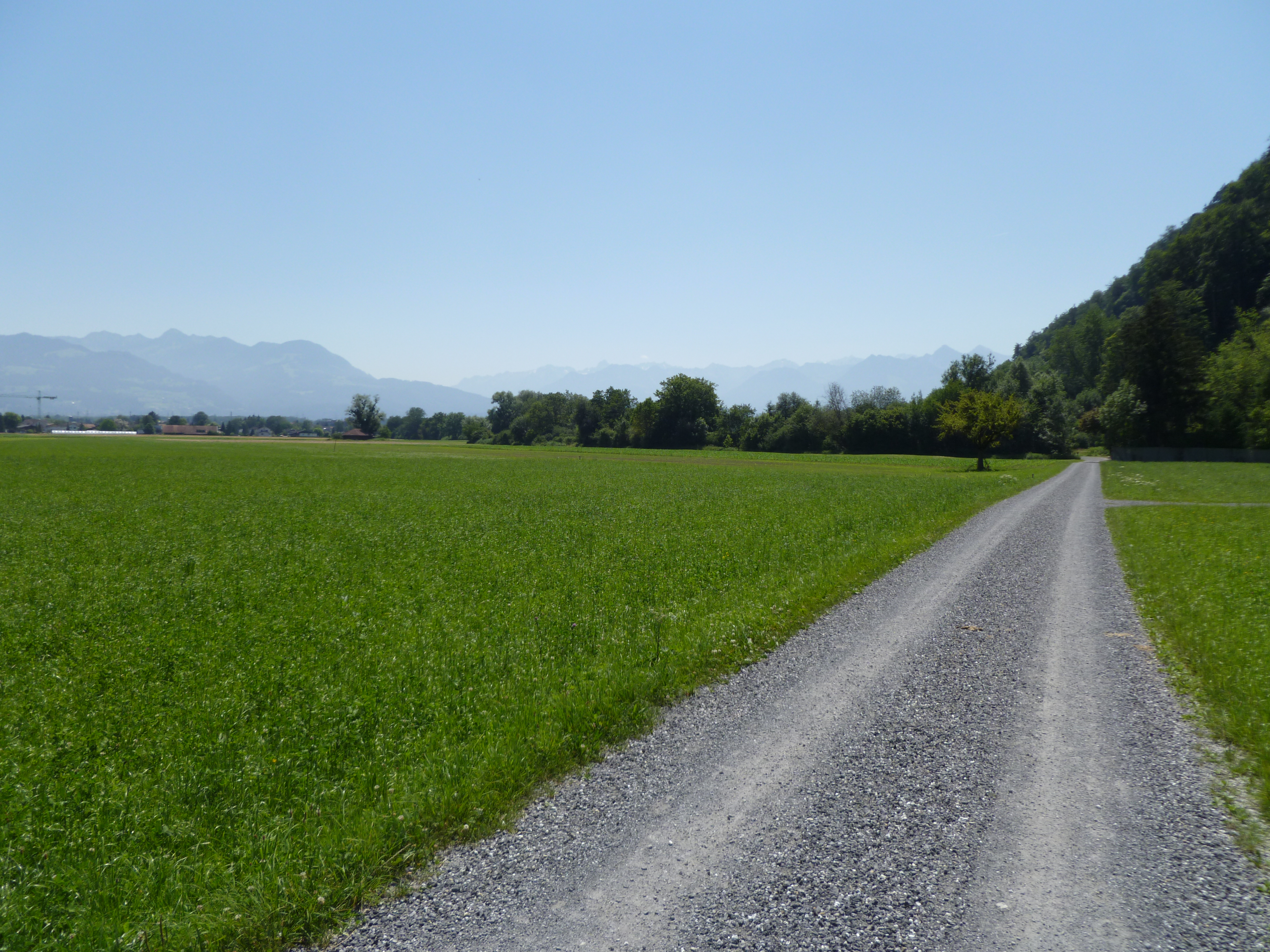
Wichenstein Street, at its end are the stairs leading up to the castle

== See also ==
- List of castles in Switzerland
