= St. Gallen State Archive =

Record keeping authority in St Gallen canton, Switzerland

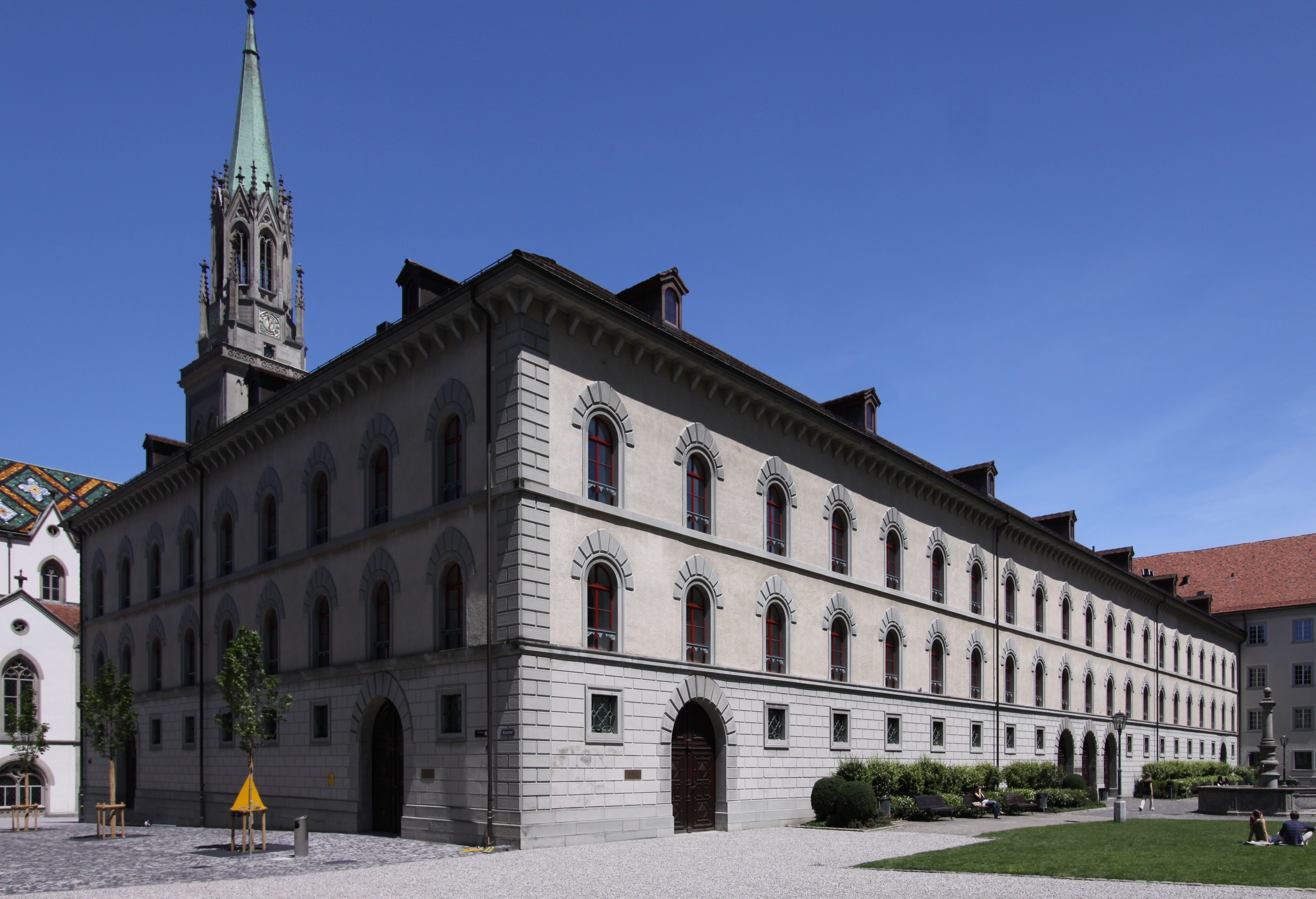
- Interactive map of St. Gallen State Archive
- 47°25′26″N 9°22′39″E
- Location: Klosterhof 1, 9000 St.Gallen
- Affiliation: list of cultural properties in St. Gallen[*]
- Website: Official website

The St. Gallen State Archive (German: Staatsarchiv des Kantons St. Gallen) is the archive for the canton of St. Gallen in Switzerland. Since the canton was founded in 1803, it has preserved the records relating to the cantonal authorities, the cantonal administration and the institutions of the state. It also contains records from the legal predecessors of today's canton. Organisationally, the State Archive is part of the Department of the Interior, located in the Office of Culture.

== Responsibilities ==
The Gesetz über Aktenführung und Archivierung (Act on Filing and Archiving – sGS 147.1) of 19 April 2011 defines the State Archive as the highest specialised cantonal body for filing and archiving. It decides on the archival value of documents offered and guarantees permanent storage and access to the records. The archive ensures the traceability of the actions of public bodies and contributes to the provision of ongoing legal certainty. In addition, it ensures the preservation of records relating to private institutions, organisations, families and individuals, in as far as these are relevant to the history of the canton and its population, and have been provided to it. It takes an independent role in carrying out its responsibilities. Further details of its legal basis and responsibilities can be found in the Verordnung über Aktenführung und Archivierung (Ordinance on Records Management and Archiving – sGS 147.11) of 19 March 2019.

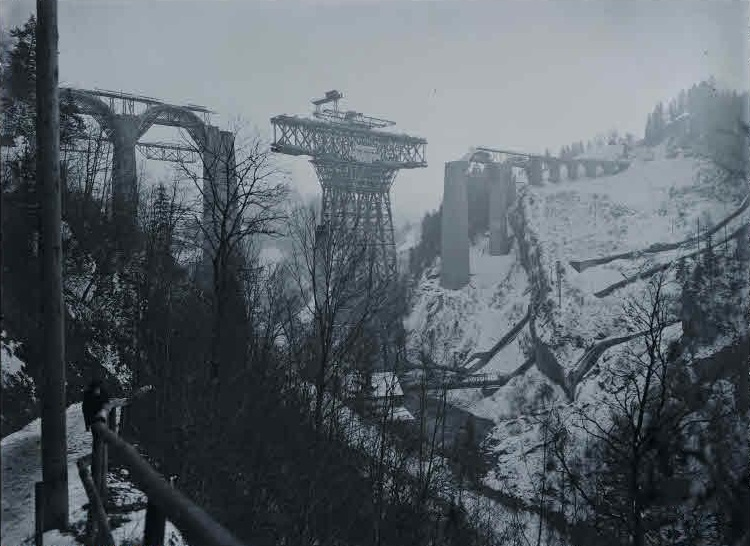
Construction of the Sitter Viaduct (1910), photo in the State Archive

== History ==
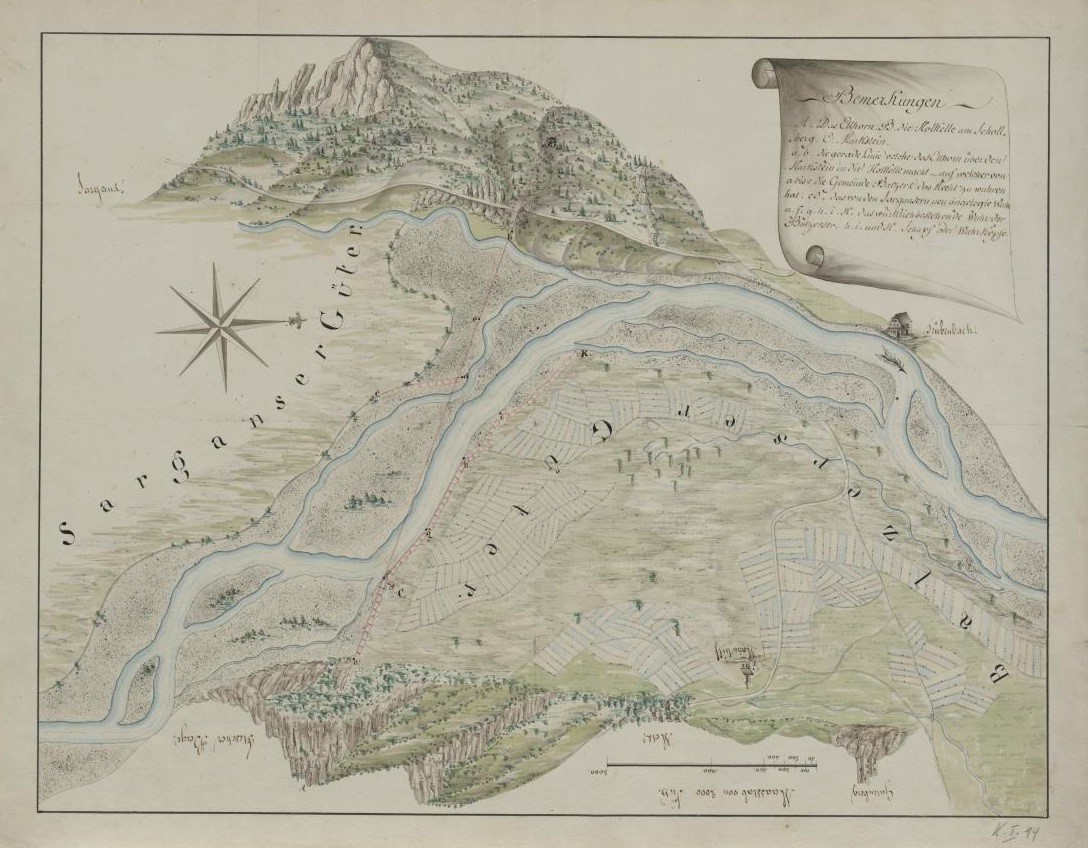
Example from the State Archive: Plan of the course of the Rhine at Balzers, 1818

Like the canton itself, the State Archive was created in 1803. Initially, the focus of its archival activity was on legal documents from the early years of the Swiss Confederation and the subsequent transitional period from 1798 to the foundation of the canton. The change in legal structure during this time led to the transfer of archival records to other cantons. Archival records, such as those from the bailiwicks of Rheintal or Sax, were finally able to be incorporated into the St. Gallen State Archive. However, some of the proposed acquisitions were difficult and some failed.

In recent years, the State Archive was able to acquire other valuable archives belonging to public bodies from the period before the canton was founded, such as the Rheineck Town Archive and the Lichtensteig Town Archive.

The fact that the canton consisted of twelve independent ‘states’ prior to 1798 is reflected in the archival landscape. For example, not all the written records from these regions are held in the State Archive. Important archival records from the period before the founding of the canton can be found in the Abbey Archive and in the St. Gallen Local Authority City Archive (the archive of the former imperial city and republic of St. Gallen), in various other cantonal archives and in communal archives in the canton. There is currently no overview of all the archival records relating to St. Gallen in other Swiss archives from before 1798. However, the cantonal records since 1803 have been secured, although there are gaps in certain periods. Important privately owned records have been acquired in recent years and the State Archive has developed a consistent process for overseeing and evaluating records, which has been in place since 2003. In addition, the State Archive plays a significant role in digital preservation. In this and other areas, it collaborates with other archives both nationally and internationally (e.g. archives in the Arge Alp).

List of state archivists
Term of office	Name
1803–1805	Franz Josef Büeler
1805–1811	Konrad Meyer
1812–1819	Vacant
1820–1826	Gallus Jakob Baumgartner
1826–1833	Josef Anton Henne
1834–1847	Peter Ehrenzeller
1847–1848	Karl Wegelin
1848–1852	Johann Theodor Gsell
1852–1858	Johann Joseph Weder
1859–1872	Otto Henne am Rhyn
1872–1885	Joseph Anton Hardegger
1886–1912	Otto Henne am Rhyn
1913–1943	Josef Anton Müller
1943–1957	Karl Schönenberger
1958–1968	Franz Perret
1968–1993	Walter Lendi
1993–2001	Silvio Bucher
Since 2002	Stefan Gemperli

== Records ==
The records are divided into state and non-state archival records. They are further divided into the following sections:

State archival records

- Old Archive (until 1798) (AA): Documents, files and books from the bailiwicks of Rheintal, Sax-Forstegg, Werdenberg, Sargans, Gaster, Uznach and the city of Rapperswil. Individual files and books on the history of Toggenburg and the historical territory of Fürstenland.
- Helvetic Archive (1798–1803) (HA): Files and books from the canton of Säntis and the St. Gallen parts of the canton of Linth.
- Archive of the Cantonal Parliament and Government (AGR, ARR): Minutes and files on parliamentary and governmental decisions.
- Cantonal Archive (1803–1931) (KA): Files, books and official publications of the cantonal administration, archived based on a classification system using the pertinence principle.
- New Archive (from 1931) (A): Records from the cantonal administration, archived in the order in which they were received and by place of delivery using the provenance principle.
- Court Archive (from 1803) (G, GA): Rulings and acts from the regional and cantonal courts.
- St. Gallen official publications (from 1803) (ZA): Publications from state authorities.
- Independent institutions of the state and companies with significant public involvement (B, HSG): Archives from the Building Insurance Institute, the Bodensee-Toggenburg-Bahn, the St. Gallen-Appenzell power plants and the University of St. Gallen.

Non-state archival records

- Corporation Archive (C): Archival records from public or private corporations.
- Private Archive (W): Estate and archival records of parties, organisations, companies, families and individuals.
- Archival collections from the State Archive (KP, Z, BM): Items including photographs, maps, plans, coins and medals.

In terms of materials, the records are primarily on paper, but may also be parchment, celluloid or glass plates. Questions about the long-term durability of electronic data and media are becoming increasingly important.

In 2022, the State Archive records would cover more than 10 kilometres. Every year, the archive grows by another 100 to 200 metres.

== Research ==
The Digital Reading Room offers numerous search options. Individual archival records or collections are digitalised (particularly image documents) and can be viewed online. Recently, digital archival material has been transferred from the public authorities.

In addition to the archival records, the State Archive also offers a publicly accessible research library. The media are included in the old catalogue of the SGBN (St. Gallen Bibliotheksnetz) or in the new SGBN catalogue and can be found in the reference library of the St. Gallen State Archive.

== Building ==
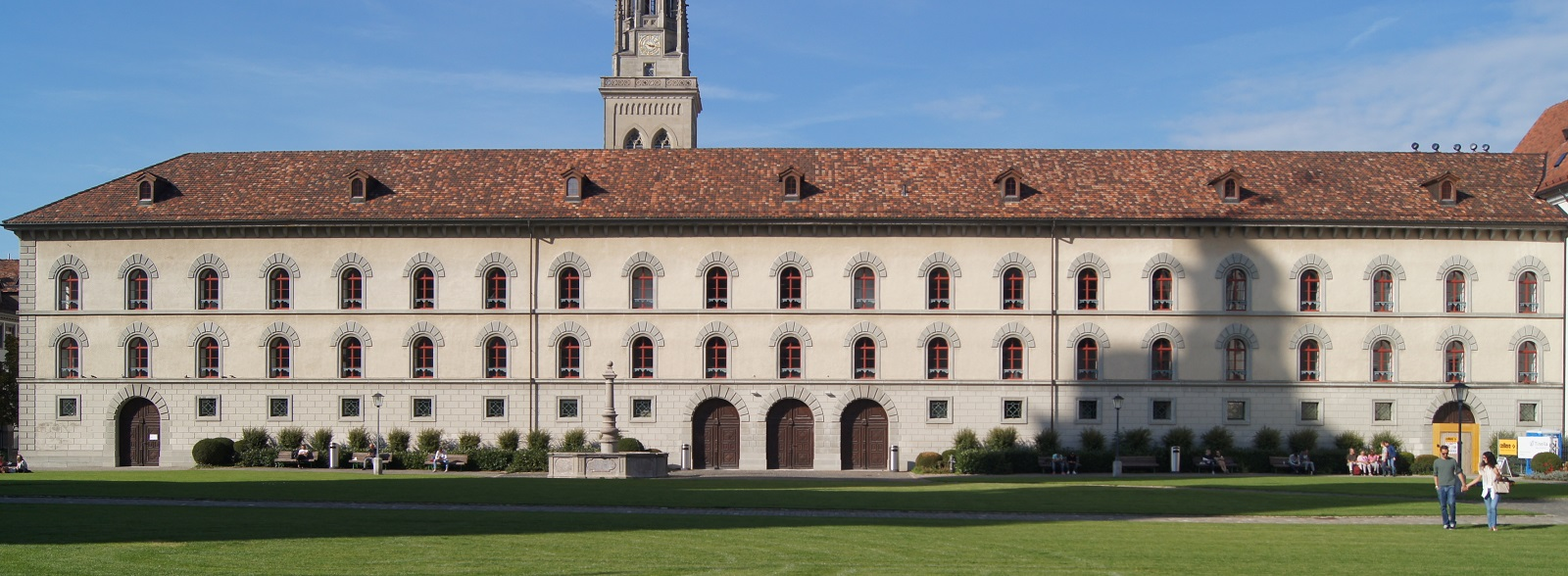

Originally built by Felix Wilhelm Kubly from 1838 to 1841 as an armoury, the north wing of the government building was in poor condition in the early 1970s. The Cantonal Council commissioned St. Gallen architect Ernest Brantschen (1922–1994) with a reconstruction project in 1970. The building was to serve as an archival and administrative complex in the future. Extensive renovations and the addition of new parts to the building were required for this. Since 1979, the State Archive, Abbey Archive and Cantonal Court have been based in this north wing, which is part of the Abbey District. Due to the increasing numbers of records and the inability to extend the building, two other buildings now house an external storage facility and other offices and workshops.
