= Buchs =

Buchs may refer to:

== Places ==
Several towns in Switzerland are called Buchs:

- Buchs, Aargau
- Buchs, St. Gallen
- Buchs, Zurich
- Buchs, Lucerne in the municipality of Dagmersellen

== People with the surname ==
- Emanuel Buchs (born 1962), Swiss ski mountaineer, cross-country skier and biathlete
- Herbert Büchs (1913–1996), German Air Force general and Luftwaffe officer

== See also ==
- Buch (disambiguation)
- Bucks (disambiguation)
- Bucs (disambiguation)
- Buochs, in the canton of Nidwalden, Switzerland
- Bux (disambiguation)
