= Werdenberg =

Werdenberg may refer to:

== Places ==
- Werdenberg, Switzerland, a town in the municipality of Grabs, St. Gallen, Switzerland
  - Werdenberg (Holy Roman Empire), a state of the Holy Roman Empire, c. 1230–1517
  - Werdenberg District, a former district
  - Werdenberg (Wahlkreis), a constituency
  - Werdenberg Castle, a castle in the town of Werdenberg

== People ==
- Agnes von Werdenberg-Trochtelfingen (c. 1440 – c. 1474) (de)
- Anna von Werdenberg (died 1554), grandmother of Gebhard Truchsess von Waldburg
- Felix von Werdenberg (c. 1480 – 1530), Knight of the Golden Fleece
- George III of Werdenberg-Sargans, married to Katharina, daughter of Charles I, Margrave of Baden-Baden
- Hartmann I. von Werdenberg (? – c. 1271), also Count of Kraiburg and Marquartstein
- Hartmann von Werdenberg-Sargans (c. 1350–1416), Bishop of Chur
- Hartmann III, Count of Werdenberg-Sargans (died 1354), ruler of the County of Sargans in around 1337, see List of state leaders in 1337
- Johann II of Werdenberg (c.1430–1486), Bishop of Augsburg
- Johann III. (Werdenberg) (c. 1416 – 1465), married to the daughter of Eberhard III, Count of Württemberg

== Fictional people ==
- Princess Marie Thérèse von Werdenberg (The Marschallin), in Richard Strauss' opera Der Rosenkavalier
