= Bux =

Bux may refer to:

- BUX, the Budapest Stock Index
- BUX (band), an American hard rock/boogie rock band
- BUX (brokerage), a European mobile brokerage company
- Bux (surname), including a list of people with the name
- Bunia Airport, Democratic Republic of the Congo (IATA code: BUX)
- Buxton railway station, Derbyshire, England (National Rail station code: BUX)

== See also ==
- Buksh, a surname or given name
- Buchs (disambiguation)
- Bucks (disambiguation)
- Bucs (disambiguation)
