= Bux (surname) =

Bux is either of two surnames with separate origins. In Europe, it is an Old English surname derived from the Anglo-Saxon word buc meaning 'beach'. It is also an alternative spelling of Buksh, a Muslim surname or male given name, derived from the Persian word bakhsh, meaning "fate", "destiny" or "share".

Notable people with the surname include:

- Danielle Lineker (née Bux; born 1979), Welsh actress and model
- Graham Bux (born 1957), Australian footballer
- Karim Bux (1865–?), Indian wrestler
- Karlheinz Bux (born 1952), German sculptor, relief muralist, and mixed-media artist
- Ishaq Bux (1917–2000), Indian and British actor
- Kuda Bux (1905–1981), Pakistan-born American mystic, magician and firewalker
- Lal Bakhsh (a.k.a. Lal Bux; born 1943), Pakistani cyclist and Olympics competitor
- Luciano Bux (1936–2014), Italian Roman Catholic bishop
- Madar Bux (1907–1967), Bengali politician
- Miran Bux (1907–1991), Pakistani cricketer
- Pir Ilahi Bux (1890–1975), Pakistani politician and activist

Fictional characters

- Bastian Balthazar Bux, from The Neverending Story
