= Buch =

Buch (the German and Silesian word for book or a modification of the German word Buche for beech) may refer to:

== People ==
- Buch (surname), a list of people with the surname Buch - mostly, in India or abroad as of Indian origin.

== Geography ==
=== Germany ===
- Buch am Wald, a municipality in the district of Ansbach, Bavaria
- Buch am Buchrain, a municipality in the district of Erding, Bavaria
- Buch am Erlbach, a municipality in the district of Landshut, Bavaria
- Buch, Swabia, a municipality in the district of Neu-Ulm, Bavaria
- Buch, Rhein-Hunsrück, a municipality in the Rhein-Hunsrück district, Rhineland-Palatinate
- Buch, Rhein-Lahn, a municipality in the Rhein-Lahn district, Rhineland-Palatinate
- Buch, Saxony-Anhalt, a village in the district of Stendal in Saxony-Anhalt
- Buch (Berlin), a locality in Pankow district, Berlin
- Buoch, in the municipality of Remshalden
- Pouch, Germany, a village in Saxony-Anhalt
- Das Buch (de) a mountain near Lindenfels

=== Austria ===
- Buch, Austria, a town in the district of Bregenz in Vorarlberg
- Puch bei Hallein, a municipality in the Hallein District

=== Switzerland ===
- Buch, Schaffhausen, a municipality in the canton of Schaffhausen
- Buch am Irchel, a municipality in the canton of Zurich
- Buch (Wiesendangen), a place in the municipality of Wiesendangen, canton of Zurich
- Buch bei Frauenfeld (until 1953 Buch bei Uesslingen), part of the municipality Uesslingen-Buch, Thurgau
- Buch bei Happerswil (Happerswil-Buch), part of the municipality of Birwinken, Thurgau
- Buch bei Märwil (until 1953 Buch bei Affeltrangen), part of the municipality of Affeltrangen, Thurgau
- Buch bei Mühleberg, part of the municipality of Mühleberg, Canton of Berne

=== France ===
- Buch, Aquitaine, a port and town on Arcachon Bay, the seat of a former lordship

=== United States ===
- Buch, Kentucky, an unincorporated community

== Astronomy ==
- Buch (crater), a crater on the Moon

== Music ==
- Das Buch, Puhdys album

== See also ==
- Captal de Buch
- Jean III de Grailly, captal de Buch
- Bucha (disambiguation)
