= Werdenbergersee =

Lake in St. Gallen, Switzerland

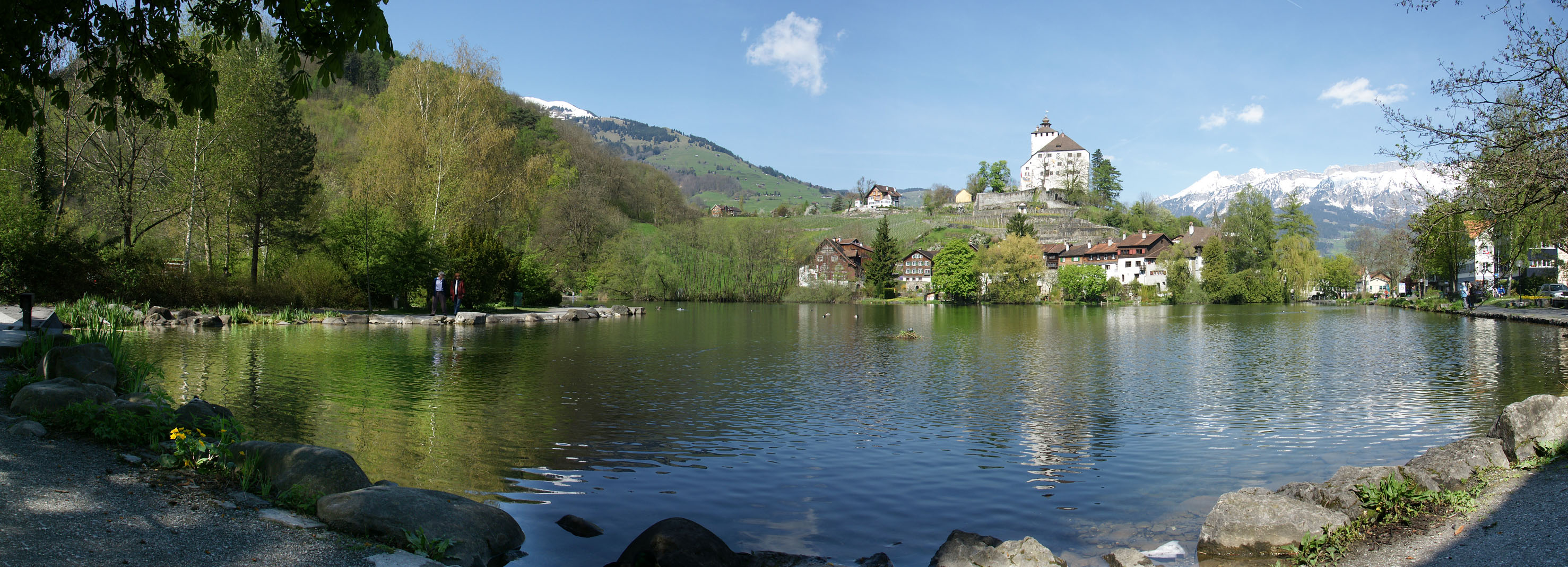

- Location within Canton of St. Gallen Location within Switzerland Location within Alps
- Interactive map of Werdenbergersee
- Location: Werdenberg, St. Gallen
- Coordinates: 47°10′03″N 9°27′50″E
- Basin countries: Switzerland
- Surface elevation: 447 m (1,467 ft)

Werdenbergersee is a small lake in Buchs, below the town of Werdenberg, in the municipality of Grabs, Canton of St. Gallen, Switzerland.
