= Büch =

Büch is a surname. Notable people with the surname include:

- Boudewijn Büch (1948–2002), Dutch writer, poet, and television presenter
- Nel Büch (1931–2013), Dutch sprinter

== See also ==
- Bach (surname)
- Buch (surname)
