= Buch (surname) =

Buch is a surname. Notable people with the surname include:

- Bob Buch (born 1949), member of the Alaska House of Representatives
- Christian Leopold von Buch (1774–1853), German geologist and paleontologist
- Claudia-Maria Buch (born 1966), German economist
- Eva-Maria Buch (1921–1943), German resistance fighter
- Idit Buch, Israeli computational biologist
- ML Buch (born 1987), Danish musician
- M. N. Buch, (1934–2015) recipient of Padma Bhusan, the third highest Indian civilian award, for his services to the nation.
- Tomás Buch (1931–2017), Argentine chemist and technologist
- Vera Buch (1895–1987), American political activist and union organizer
- Walter Buch (1883–1949), German jurist and war criminal

== See also ==
- Captal de Buch, including Jean III de Grailly, captal de Buch
