= Gerardo Clemente =

Swiss footballer (born 1984)

Personal information
- Full name: Gerardo Clemente
- Date of birth: 2 October 1984 (age 42)
- Place of birth: Grabs, Switzerland
- Height: 1.82 m (6 ft 0 in)
- Position: Midfielder

Team information
- Current team: USV Eschen/Mauren
- Number: 14

Youth career
- 1997–2000: FC St. Gallen
- 2000–2005: Juventus

Senior career*
Years	Team	Apps	(Gls)
2005–2006	Novara	6	(0)
2006–2007	Massese	22	(2)
2007–2008	Lucerne	5	(0)
2008–	USV Eschen/Mauren		

International career
2001–2003	Switzerland U-19		
- * Club domestic league appearances and goals as of 14 May 2008

Gerardo Clemente (born 2 October 1984) is a Swiss football player who currently plays for USV Eschen/Mauren.

== Career ==
Clemente began his career in the youth side for FC St. Gallen and joined 2000 alongside team member Davide Chiumento to the Primavera team from Juventus FC He previously played for FC Lucerne in the Swiss Super League.

== Personal life ==
Gerardo is of Italian descent and his brother Francesco plays with him by USV Eschen/Mauren in Liechtenstein.
