= Voralpsee =

Lake in St. Gallen, Switzerland

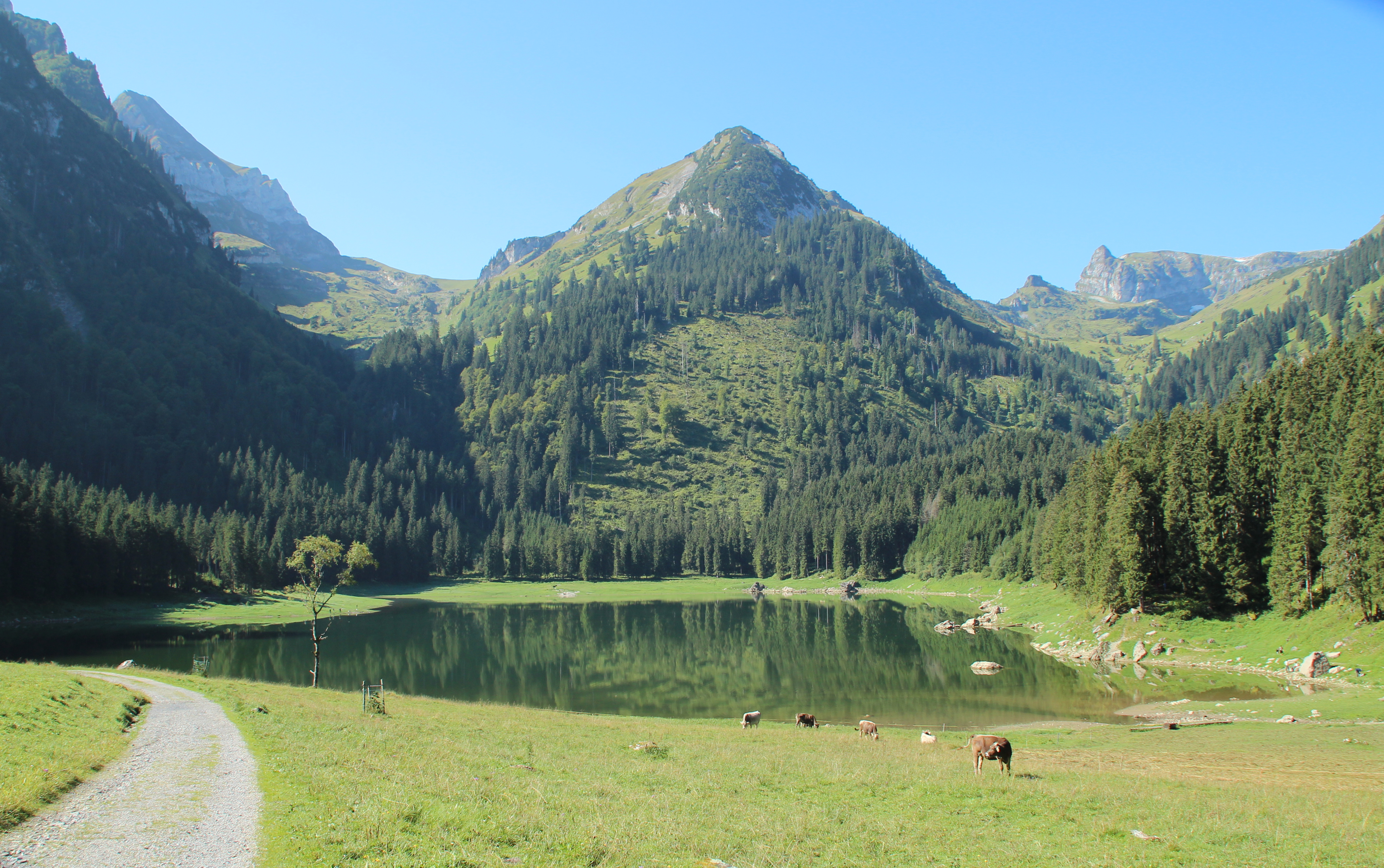

- Location within Canton of St. Gallen Location within Switzerland Location within Alps
- Interactive map of Voralpsee
- Location: Canton of St. Gallen
- Coordinates: 47°09′23″N 9°22′34″E
- Basin countries: Switzerland
- Surface area: 14 ha (35 acres)
- Surface elevation: 1,123 m (3,684 ft)

Voralpsee is a lake above Grabs in the Canton of St. Gallen, Switzerland.

== See also ==
- List of mountain lakes of Switzerland
