= Gams =

- Municipality
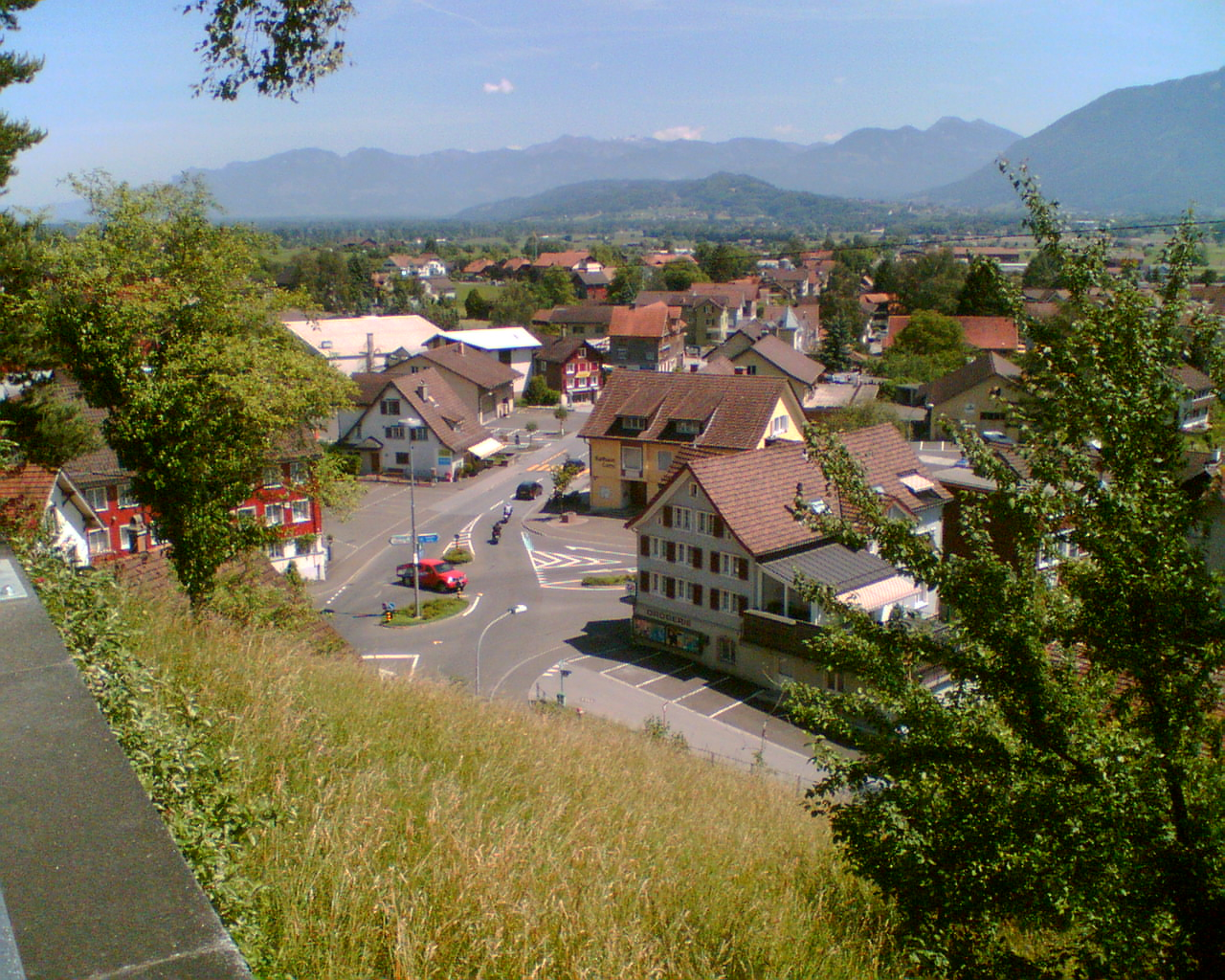
- Gams village center

- Coat of arms
- Location of Gams
- Location within Switzerland Location within Canton of St. Gallen
- Coordinates: 47°12′N 9°26′E
- Country: Switzerland
- Canton: St. Gallen
- District: Werdenberg

Government
  - Mayor: Werner Schöb

Area
  - Total: 22.28 km^{2} (8.60 sq mi)
- Elevation: 490 m (1,610 ft)

Population (December 2020)
  - Total: 3,587
  - Density: 161.0/km^{2} (417.0/sq mi)
- Time zone: UTC+01:00 (CET)
  - Summer (DST): UTC+02:00 (CEST)
- Postal code: 9473
- SFOS number: 3272
- ISO 3166 code: CH-SG
- Localities: Altendorf, Buchser Berg, Burgerau, Räfis
- Surrounded by: Buchs, Grabs, Sennwald, Wildhaus
- Website: www.gams.ch

Gams is a municipality in the Wahlkreis (constituency) of Werdenberg in the canton of St. Gallen in Switzerland.

== History ==
Aerial view (1964)

Gams is first mentioned in 835 as Campesias. In 1210 it was mentioned as Chames, in 1236 as Gamps. Until the Middle Ages it was a Romansh village and was known in Romansh as Chiamp.

== Geography ==
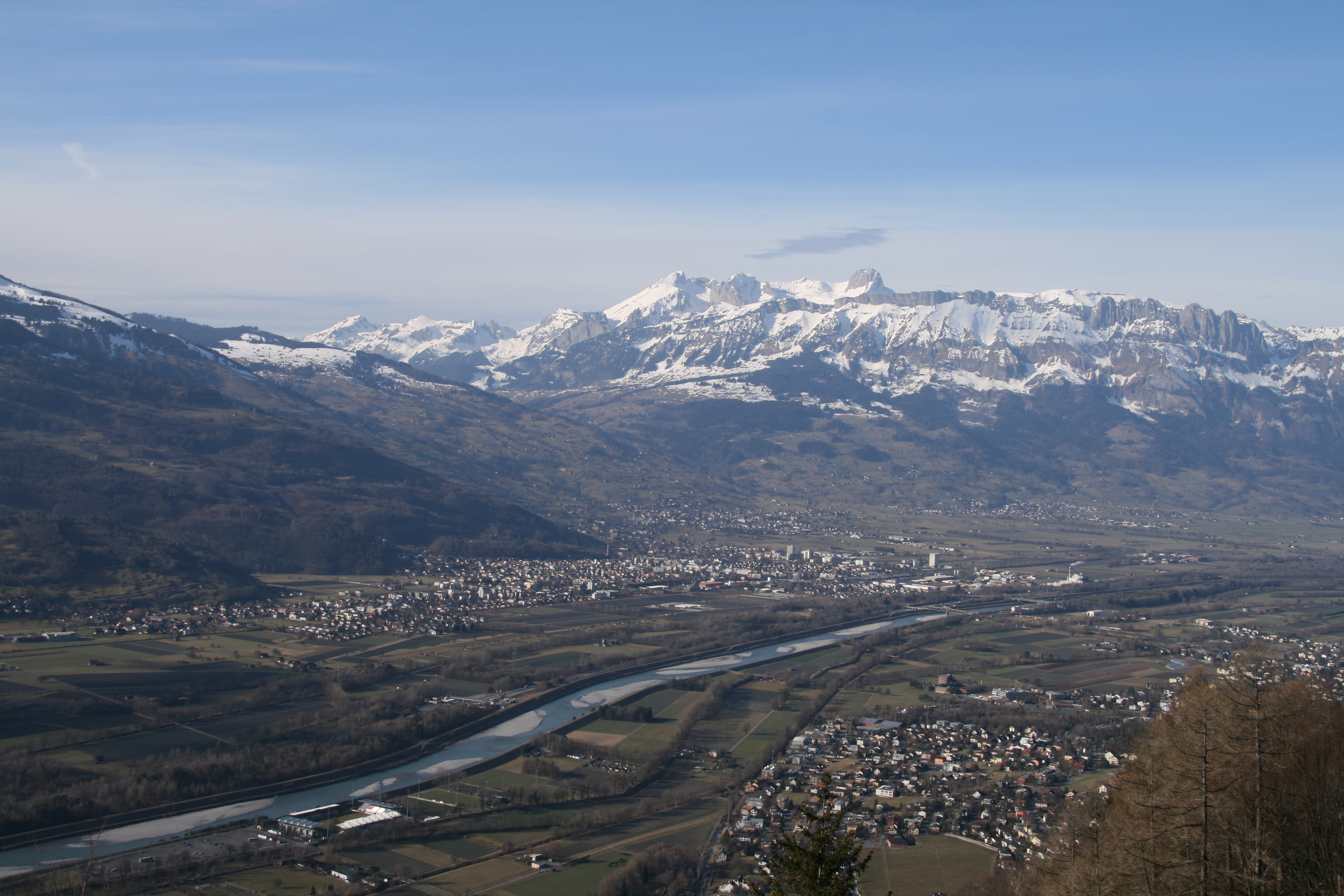
Buchs SG, Grabs SG, Gams SG in Switzerland and Schaan in Liechtenstein

Gams has an area, as of 2006, of 22.3 km^{2} (8.6 sq mi). Of this area, 59.7% is used for agricultural purposes, while 30.3% is forested. Of the rest of the land, 6.8% is settled (buildings or roads) and the remainder (3.3%) is non-productive (rivers or lakes).

The municipality is located in the Werdenberg Wahlkreis, at the foot of the Alpstein sub-range of the Appenzell Alps and on the edge of the Rhine valley. It sits at the eastern entrance into the Toggenburg as well as the footpath over the Saxerlücke to Appenzell and St. Gallen. Additionally, it was on the most important trade route between Chur-Sargans-Lake Constance and was the starting point of the pilgrimage routes to Einsiedeln and Rankweil. It consists of the village of Gams with its surrounding settlements and the village of Gasenzen.

== Coat of arms ==
The blazon of the municipal coat of arms is Per fess Argent and Gules overall a Chamois Sable statant on Coupeaux Or. The chamois (German: Gemse) on the coat of arms is an example of false canting. The name Gams doesn't come from Gemse but from the Romansh Campesias which means "field of sheep".

== Demographics ==
Gams has a population (as of 31 December 2020) of 3,587. As of 2007, about 15.3% of the population was made up of foreign nationals. Of the foreign population, (as of 2000), 91 are from Germany, 22 are from Italy, 118 are from ex-Yugoslavia, 34 are from Austria, 8 are from Turkey, and 81 are from another country. Over the last 10 years the population has grown at a rate of 9.3%. Most of the population (as of 2000) speaks German (94.0%), with Albanian being second most common ( 1.4%) and Italian being third ( 0.8%). Of the Swiss national languages (as of 2000), 2,695 speak German, 13 people speak French, 22 people speak Italian, and 5 people speak Romansh.

The age distribution, as of 2000, in Gams is; 413 children or 14.4% of the population are between 0 and 9 years old and 480 teenagers or 16.7% are between 10 and 19. Of the adult population, 316 people or 11.0% of the population are between 20 and 29 years old. 443 people or 15.5% are between 30 and 39, 450 people or 15.7% are between 40 and 49, and 300 people or 10.5% are between 50 and 59. The senior population distribution is 217 people or 7.6% of the population are between 60 and 69 years old, 163 people or 5.7% are between 70 and 79, there are 80 people or 2.8% who are between 80 and 89, and there are 5 people or 0.2% who are between 90 and 99.

In 2000 there were 262 persons (or 9.1% of the population) who were living alone in a private dwelling. There were 475 (or 16.6%) persons who were part of a couple (married or otherwise committed) without children, and 1,815 (or 63.3%) who were part of a couple with children. There were 121 (or 4.2%) people who lived in single parent home, while there are 29 persons who were adult children living with one or both parents, 18 persons who lived in a household made up of relatives, 14 who lived household made up of unrelated persons, and 133 who are either institutionalized or live in another type of collective housing.

In the 2007 federal election the most popular party was the SVP which received 35.1% of the vote. The next three most popular parties were the CVP (28.8%), the FDP (13.5%) and the SP (12.3%).

The entire Swiss population is generally well educated. In Gams about 68.6% of the population (between age 25-64) have completed either non-mandatory upper secondary education or additional higher education (either university or a Fachhochschule). Out of the total population in Gams, as of 2000, the highest education level completed by 621 people (21.7% of the population) was Primary, while 974 (34.0%) have completed Secondary, 273 (9.5%) have attended a Tertiary school, and 88 (3.1%) are not in school. The remainder did not answer this question.

The historical population is given in the following table:

year	population
1800	1,043
1850	1,783
1900	2,156
1950	2,025
1970	2,219
2000	2,867

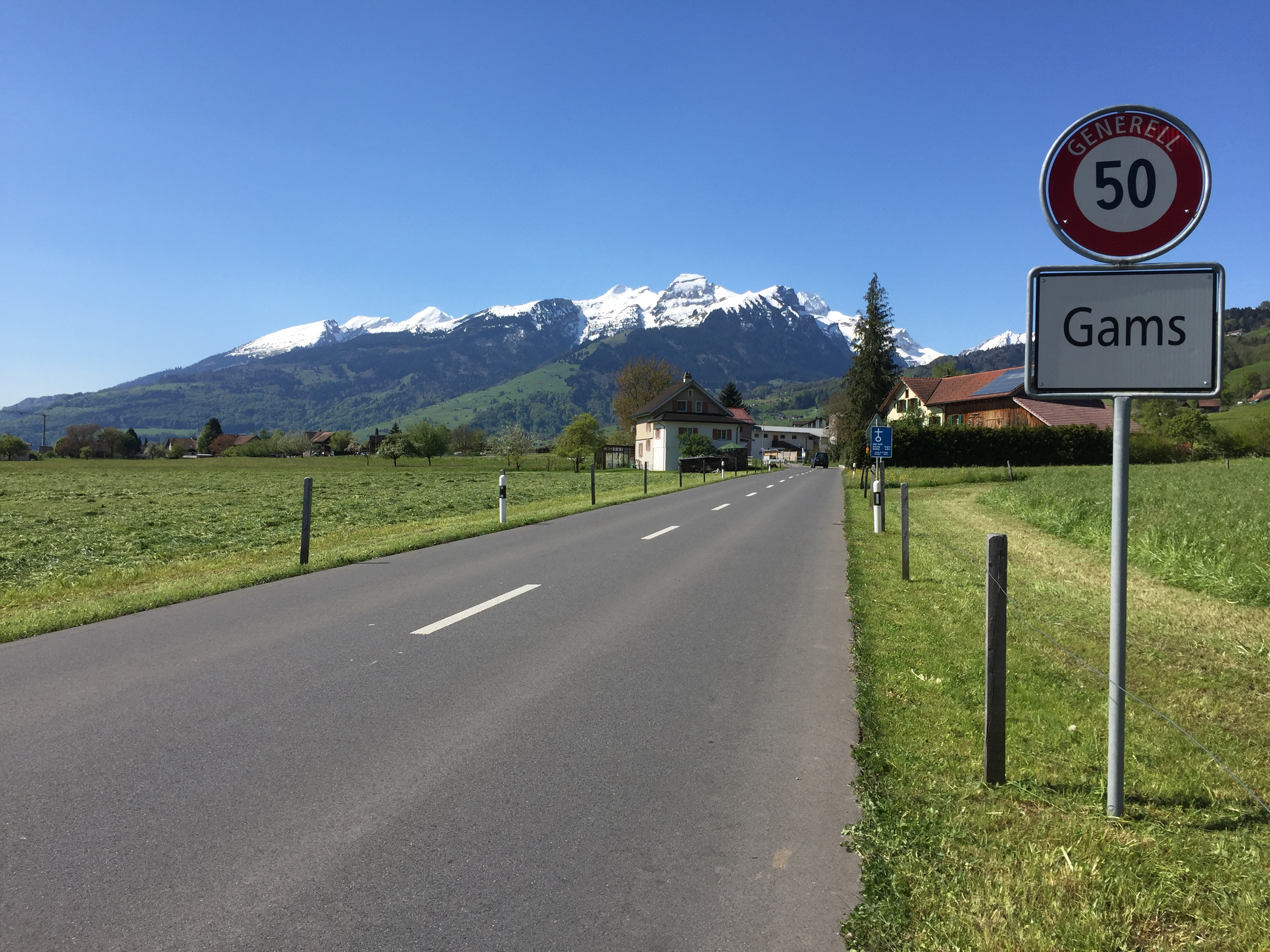
Entering Gams

== Economy ==
As of 2007, Gams had an unemployment rate of 0.76%. As of 2005, there were 230 people employed in the primary economic sector and about 85 businesses involved in this sector. 383 people are employed in the secondary sector and there are 41 businesses in this sector. 393 people are employed in the tertiary sector, with 86 businesses in this sector.

As of October 2009 the average unemployment rate was 2.6%. There were 208 businesses in the municipality of which 39 were involved in the secondary sector of the economy while 88 were involved in the third.

As of 2000 there were 571 residents who worked in the municipality, while 834 residents worked outside Gams and 323 people commuted into the municipality for work.

== Religion ==
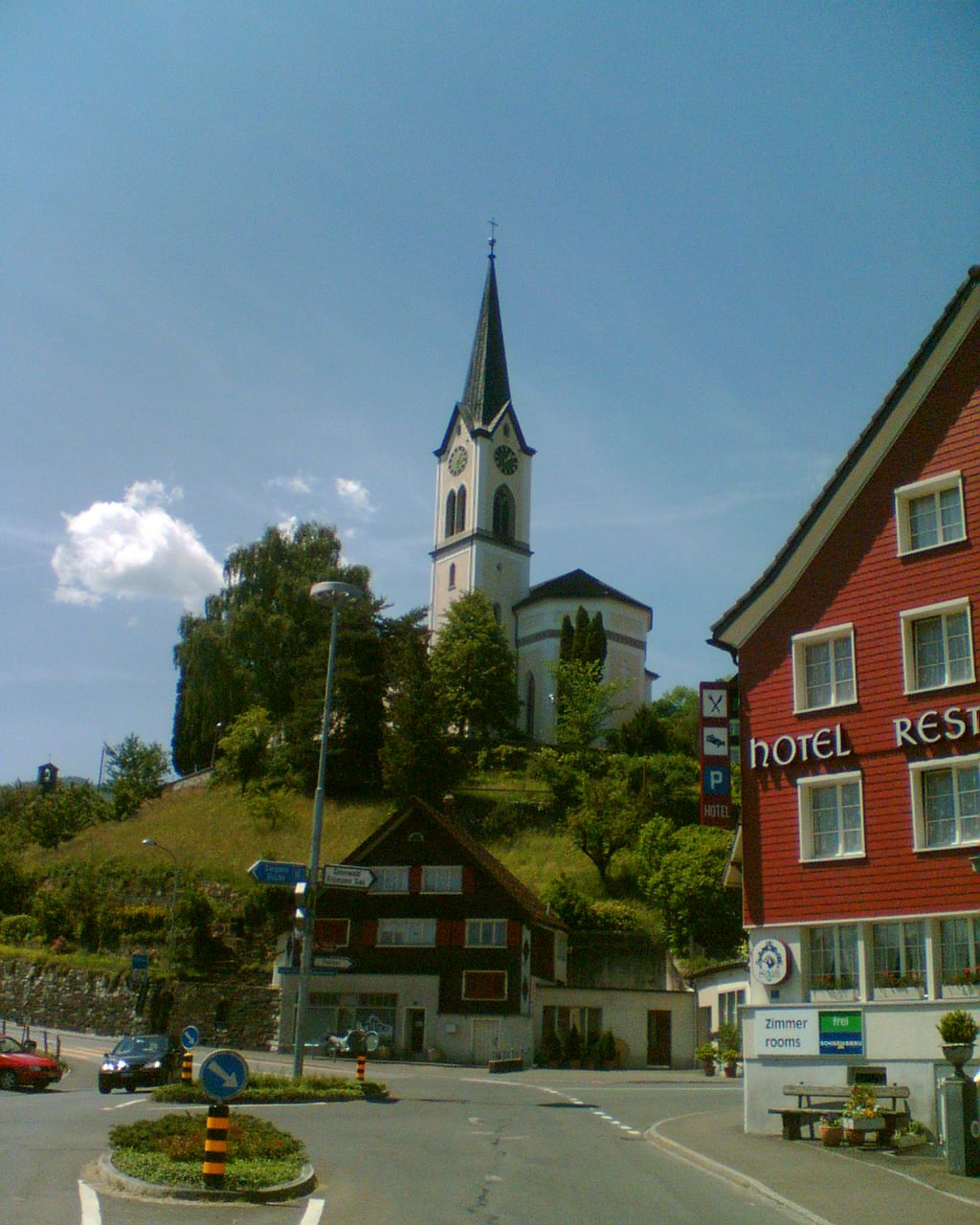
Gams village and St. Michael's hill and church

From the 2000 census, 1,811 or 63.2% are Roman Catholic, while 649 or 22.6% belonged to the Swiss Reformed Church. Of the rest of the population, there are 27 individuals (or about 0.94% of the population) who belong to the Orthodox Church, and there are 44 individuals (or about 1.53% of the population) who belong to another Christian church. There are 110 (or about 3.84% of the population) who are Islamic. There are 7 individuals (or about 0.24% of the population) who belong to another church (not listed on the census), 130 (or about 4.53% of the population) belong to no church, are agnostic or atheist, and 89 individuals (or about 3.10% of the population) did not answer the question.
