= Bucs =

Bucs or BUCS may refer to:

- British Universities and Colleges Sport, the governing body for university sport in the United Kingdom
- The Bucs, a nickname for the Pittsburgh Pirates, a US professional baseball team
- The Bucs, a nickname for the Tampa Bay Buccaneers, an American football team

== See also ==
- Buchs (disambiguation)
- Bucks (disambiguation)
- Bux (disambiguation)
