= Uffikon =

Former municipality, canton of Lucerne

- Former municipality
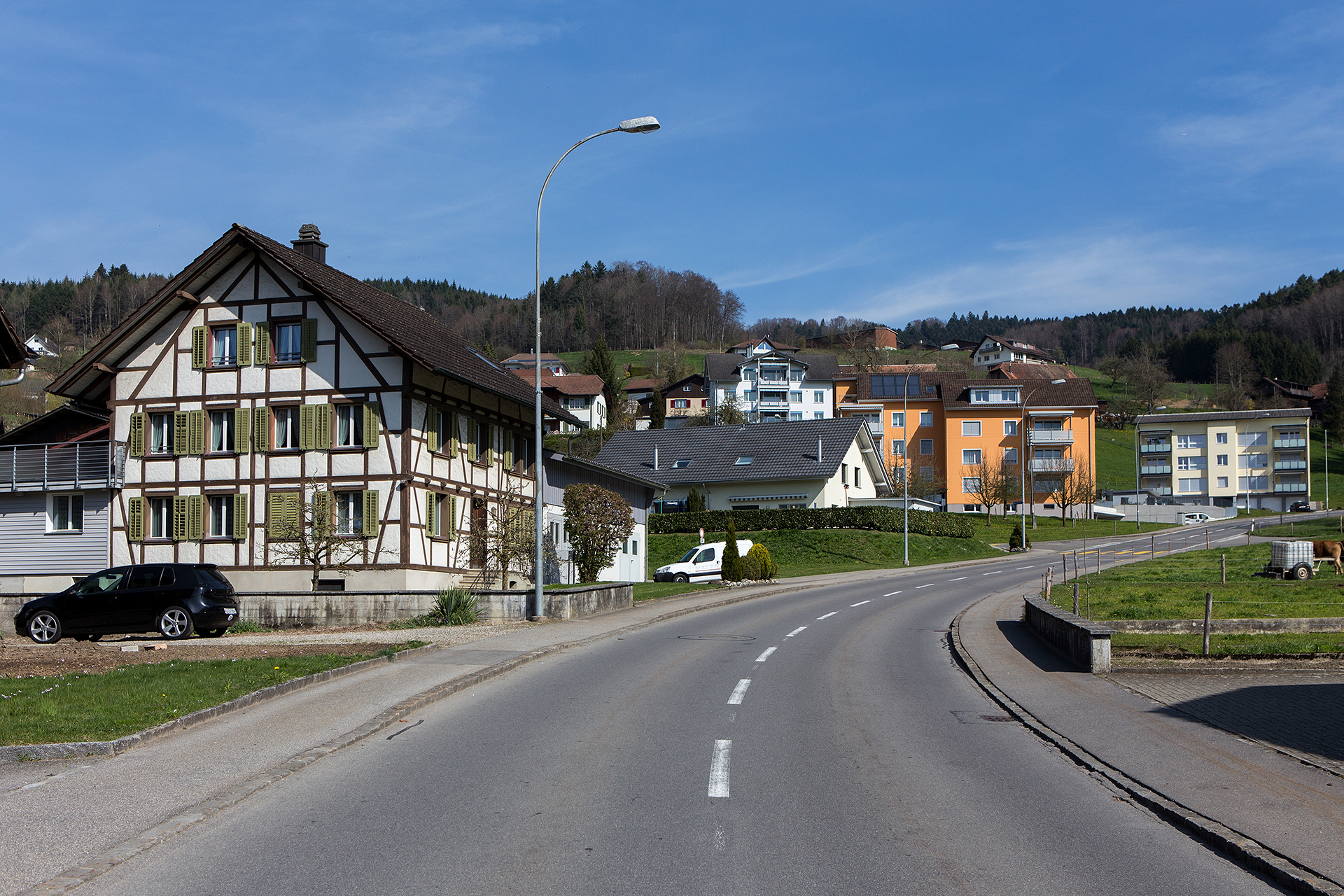
- Dorfstrasse in Uffikon
- Location of Uffikon
- Location within Switzerland Location within Canton of Lucerne
- Coordinates: 47°12′36″N 8°1′3″E
- Country: Switzerland
- Canton: Lucerne
- District: Willisau
- Municipality: Dagmersellen

Population (2000)
  - Total: 634
- Time zone: UTC+01:00 (CET)
  - Summer (DST): UTC+02:00 (CEST)
- SFOS number: 1144
- ISO 3166 code: CH-LU
- Website: Profile (in German),

Uffikon is a former municipality in the Willisau district of the canton of Lucerne, Switzerland. Since 2006 it has been part of the municipality of Dagmersellen, together with Buchs. It lies in the Hürntal.

== History ==
Uffikon is first mentioned in 924 as Uffinchova. In 1173 the chapter of Beromünster held three quarters of the church rights. Because the church advocacy (Kirchenvogtei) and the local lordship (Twing) were closely linked, the Habsburgs held only the court for minor offenses (Frevelgericht) in 1303. The manor farm (Meierhof), the right of patronage (Kirchensatz), the advocacy (Vogtei) and the local lordship (Twing und Bann) passed in 1337 from Walter von Grünenberg to Ulrich von Büttikon. From 1406 to 1416 they were again held by the Grünenberg family, and in 1450 they came to Lucerne through Peter Ottemann of Zofingen.

The first church building dates from the 10th or 11th century; the parish church of St. James the Greater was rebuilt in 1870–1872. The right of collation (Kollatur) was held by Lucerne from 1450 to 1875 and has since belonged to the parish, which has also included Buchs since 1809. In 1798 Uffikon was assigned to the Helvetic district of Altishofen, in 1803 to the district (Amt) of Sursee and in 1814 to that of Willisau.

A mill is mentioned in 1285. A workwear factory operated from 1938 to 1981, and peat was extracted industrially from 1941 to 1946. With the opening of the A2 motorway in 1980, Uffikon became a place of residence for commuters to Sursee and the Wigger valley, but it kept its rural character, with 52% of the jobs in the primary sector in 2005.

Uffikon had about 370 inhabitants around 1695, 486 in 1798, 703 in 1850, 523 in 1900, 532 in 1950 and 634 in 2000.

== Bibliography ==
- Die Kunstdenkmäler des Kantons Luzern, vol. 5, 1959, pp. 209–210
- F. Glauser, J. J. Siegrist, Die Luzerner Pfarreien und Landvogteien, 1977
- 1100 Jahre Uffinchova-Uffikon, 1993
