= Sevelen =

- Municipality
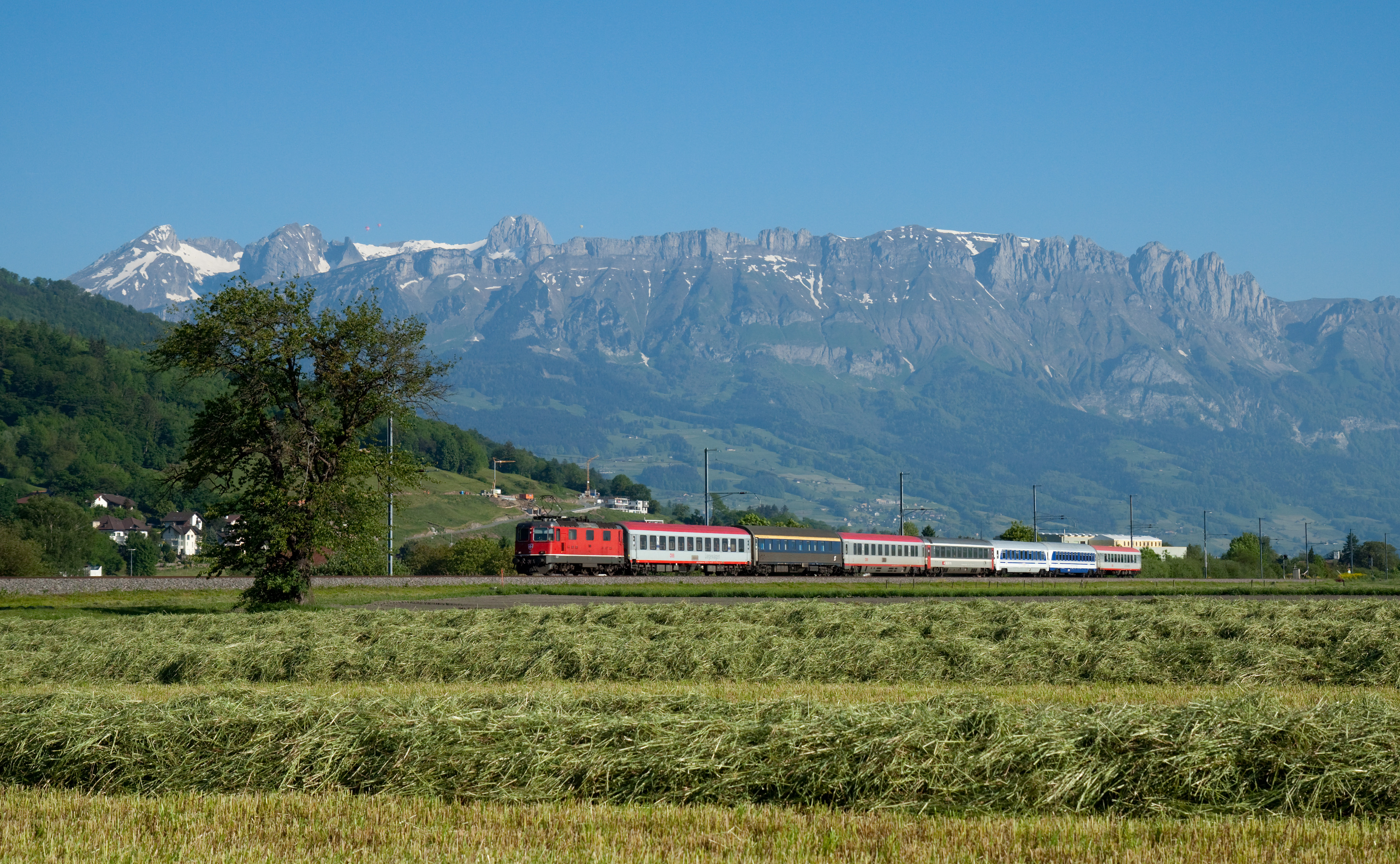

- Coat of arms
- Location of Sevelen
- Location within Switzerland Location within Canton of St. Gallen
- Coordinates: 47°7′N 9°29′E
- Country: Switzerland
- Canton: St. Gallen
- District: Werdenberg

Government
  - Mayor: vice-mayor Eduard Neuhaus (as of 2021)

Area
  - Total: 30.34 km^{2} (11.71 sq mi)
- Elevation: 460 m (1,510 ft)

Population (December 2020)
  - Total: 5,249
  - Density: 173.0/km^{2} (448.1/sq mi)
- Time zone: UTC+01:00 (CET)
  - Summer (DST): UTC+02:00 (CEST)
- Postal code: 9475
- SFOS number: 3275
- ISO 3166 code: CH-SG
- Surrounded by: Buchs, Grabs, Triesen (LI), Vaduz (LI), Walenstadt, Wartau
- Twin towns: Issum (Germany)
- Website: www.sevelen.ch

Sevelen is a municipality in the Wahlkreis (constituency) of Werdenberg in the canton of St. Gallen in Switzerland.

== History ==
Sevelen is first mentioned about 1160 as Sevellins.

== Geography ==
Sevelen has an area, as of 2006, of 30.3 km^{2} (11.7 sq mi). Of this area, 51.1% is used for agricultural purposes, while 33.3% is forested. Of the rest of the land, 7% is settled (buildings or roads) and the remainder (8.6%) is non-productive (rivers or lakes).

The municipality is located in the Werdenberg Wahlkreis. It consists of the village of Sevelen and the hamlets of Rans, Oberräfis, St. Ulrich, Välsli, Glaat and scattered farm houses.

Aerial view by Walter Mittelholzer (1919)

== Coat of arms ==
The blazon of the municipal coat of arms is Argent a Bend dancety Sable.

== Demographics ==
Sevelen has a population (as of 31 December 2020) of 5,128. As of 2007, about 28.8% of the population was made up of foreign nationals. Of the foreign population (as of 2000), 94 are from Germany, 156 are from Italy, 509 are from ex-Yugoslavia, 63 are from Austria, 67 are from Turkey, and 180 are from another country. Over the last 10 years the population has decreased at a rate of -0.1%. Most of the population (as of 2000) speaks German (86.1%), with Albanian being second most common ( 4.3%) and Italian being third ( 2.4%). Of the Swiss national languages (as of 2000), 3,661 speak German, 16 people speak French, 100 people speak Italian, and 23 people speak Romansh.

The age distribution, as of 2000, in Sevelen was as follows: 540 children, or 12.7% of the population, were between 0 and 9 years old; and 641 teenagers, or 15.1%, were between 10 and 19. Of the adult population, 587 people, or 13.8% of the population, were between 20 and 29 years old. Some 685 people, or 16.1%, were between 30 and 39; 673 people, or 15.8%, between 40 and 49; and 538 people, or 12.6%, between 50 and 59. The senior population distribution was 298 people, or 7.0% of the population, who were between 60 and 69 years old; and 182 people, or 4.3%, between 70 and 79. There were 95 people, or 2.2%, who were between 80 and 89; and 14 people, or 0.3%, who were between 90 and 99.

In 2000 there were 484 persons (or 11.4% of the population) who were living alone in a private dwelling. There were 882 (or 20.7%) persons who were part of a couple (married or otherwise committed) without children, and 2,461 (or 57.9%) who were part of a couple with children. There were 246 (or 5.8%) people who lived in single parent home, while there are 34 persons who were adult children living with one or both parents, 10 persons who lived in a household made up of relatives, 37 who lived household made up of unrelated persons, and 99 who are either institutionalized or live in another type of collective housing.

In the 2007 federal election the most popular party was the SVP which received 39.2% of the vote. The next three most popular parties were the FDP (19.2%), the SP (16.6%) and the CVP (8.4%).

In Sevelen about 66% of the population (between age 25–64) have completed either non-mandatory upper secondary education or additional higher education (either university or a Fachhochschule). Out of the total population in Sevelen, as of 2000, the highest education level completed by 957 people (22.5% of the population) was Primary, while 1,492 (35.1%) have completed their secondary education, 427 (10.0%) have attended a Tertiary school, and 233 (5.5%) are not in school. The remainder did not answer this question.

The historical population is given in the following table:

year	population
1831	1,593
1850	1,585
1900	1,821
1930	2,052
1950	2,254
1980	2,839
1990	3,623

== Economy ==
As of 2007, Sevelen had an unemployment rate of 1.34%. As of 2005, there were 158 people employed in the primary economic sector and about 55 businesses involved in this sector. 1,137 people are employed in the secondary sector and there are 52 businesses in this sector. 618 people are employed in the tertiary sector, with 113 businesses in this sector.

As of October 2009 the average unemployment rate was 3.5%. There were 221 businesses in the municipality of which 53 were involved in the secondary sector of the economy while 120 were involved in the third.

As of 2000 there were 897 residents who worked in the municipality, while 1,406 residents worked outside Sevelen and 972 people commuted into the municipality for work.

== Transport ==
Sevelen is connected to Vaduz both by the Vaduz–Sevelen footbridge and by the Werdenberger-Binnenkanal bridge for motor vehicles. LIEmobil operates buses between Sevelen and Vaduz.

== Religion ==
From the 2000 census, 1,275 or 30.0% are Roman Catholic, while 1,865 or 43.9% belonged to the Swiss Reformed Church. Of the rest of the population, there is 1 individual who belongs to the Christian Catholic faith, there are 73 individuals (or about 1.72% of the population) who belong to the Orthodox Church, and there are 158 individuals (or about 3.72% of the population) who belong to another Christian church. There is 1 individual who is Jewish, and 449 (or about 10.56% of the population) who are Islamic. There are 24 individuals (or about 0.56% of the population) who belong to another church (not listed on the census), 275 (or about 6.47% of the population) belong to no church, are agnostic or atheist, and 132 individuals (or about 3.10% of the population) did not answer the question.

== Weather ==
Sevelen has an average of 138.5 days of rain or snow per year and on average receives 1,325 mm (52.2 in) of precipitation. The wettest month is August during which time Sevelen receives an average of 169 mm (6.7 in) of rain or snow. During this month there is precipitation for an average of 13.9 days. The month with the most days of precipitation is June, with an average of 14.4, but with only 154 mm (6.1 in) of rain or snow. The driest month of the year is October with an average of 78 mm (3.1 in) of precipitation over 13.9 days.

== See also ==
- Sevelen railway station
