= Arsenicum album =

Homeopathic preparation based on arsenic

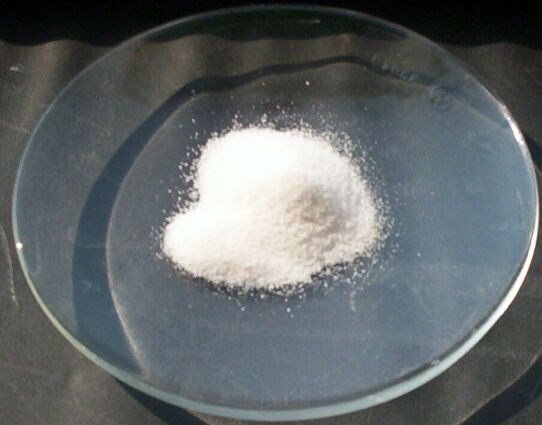
A sample of Arsenic(III) oxide.

In the pseudoscientific field of homeopathy, arsenicum album (Arsenic. alb.) is a solution prepared by diluting aqueous arsenic trioxide generally until there is little to no arsenic remaining in individual doses. It is used by homeopaths to treat a range of symptoms that include digestive disorders and, as an application of the Law of Similars, has been suggested by homeopathy as a treatment for arsenic poisoning. Since the arsenic oxide in a homeopathic preparation is normally non-existent, it is considered generally safe, although cases of arsenic poisoning from poorly prepared homeopathic treatments sold in India have been reported. When properly prepared, however, the extreme dilutions, typically to at least 1 in 10^{24}, or 12C in homeopathic notation, mean that a pill would not contain even a molecule of the original arsenic used. While Anisur Khuda-Bukhsh's unblinded studies have claimed an effect on reducing arsenic toxicity, they do not recommend its large-scale use, and studies of homeopathic remedies have been shown to generally have problems that prevent them from being considered unambiguous evidence. There is no known mechanism for how arsenicum album could remove arsenic from a body, and there is insufficient evidence for it to be considered effective medicine (for any condition) by the scientific community.

== Use in homeopathy ==
Arsenicum album is one of the fifteen most important recommendations in homeopathy. In classical homeopathy, people are sometimes assigned a constitutional type, named after the homeopathic remedy applied, partly on the idea that people with similar physical or mental characteristics who suffer from similar symptoms can be treated effectively with their constitutional remedy. "Arsen. alb." types are "tense, restless ambitious individuals" with a tendency toward hypochondriasis, pessimism, need for reassurance, and a meticulous attention to neatness and detail.

For homeopathic use, arsenicum album is prepared by separating arsenic from iron (as in arsenopyrite), cobalt, or nickel by baking at high temperatures. The powder is then ground and diluted with lactose. In the final dilution, statistically most doses will contain zero molecules of the original arsenic used; some might contain a single molecule. The final product is sold as tinctures (liquid), tablets, pellets, or powder.

Key homeopathic uses include treating anxiety and fear caused by insecurity, digestive disorders, mucosal inflammation, and ailments characterized symptomatically by burning pain. It was also used once for treatment of syphilis.

Arsenicum's effectiveness as a treatment has been widely questioned and decried by the scientific community, as current scientific testing methods are incongruent with homeopathy's tenet around individuals' unique constitution as a key input into choosing from a range of remedies that can all be prescribed to treat the same ailment. Because care is individualized, it flies in the face of medical "standards of care", which identify the most effective treatments for the largest sample of individuals. This individualized care based on constitution also makes large scale double-blind studies — widely considered the golden standard for testing treatment effectiveness — almost impossible to run.

== Research studies ==
Several studies have been done into Arsenicum album. In addition, the ideas behind homeopathy are scientifically different to principles of modern medicine.
