= Buksh =

Buksh or Bukhsh (Persian: بخش) is a Muslim surname or male given name, derived from the Persian word bakhsh, meaning "fate", "destiny" or "share". An alternative spelling is Bux. The name may refer to:

- Allah Bukhsh Karim Bukhsh Brohi (1915–1987), Pakistani politician
- Anisur Khuda-Bukhsh (born 1948), Indian zoologist
- Khuda Buksh (1912–1974), Bangladeshi businessman
- M. S. Buksh (died 1967), Fijian politician
- Malik Khuda Buksh Tiwana, Pakistani politician
- Mirza Namrud Buksh (1925–2007), Fijian politician

== See also ==
- Bux (surname)
