= Graham Bux =

Australian rules footballer

Personal information
- Full name: Graham Bux
- Born: 25 July 1957 (age 69)
- Height: 183 cm (6 ft 0 in)
- Weight: 76 kg (168 lb)

Playing career^{1}
Years	Club	Games (Goals)
1978	Fitzroy	2 (0)
- ^{1} Playing statistics correct to the end of 1978.

Graham Bux is a former Australian rules footballer, who played for the Fitzroy Football Club in the Victorian Football League (VFL).
