= Buchs, St. Gallen =

Buchs SG
- Municipality
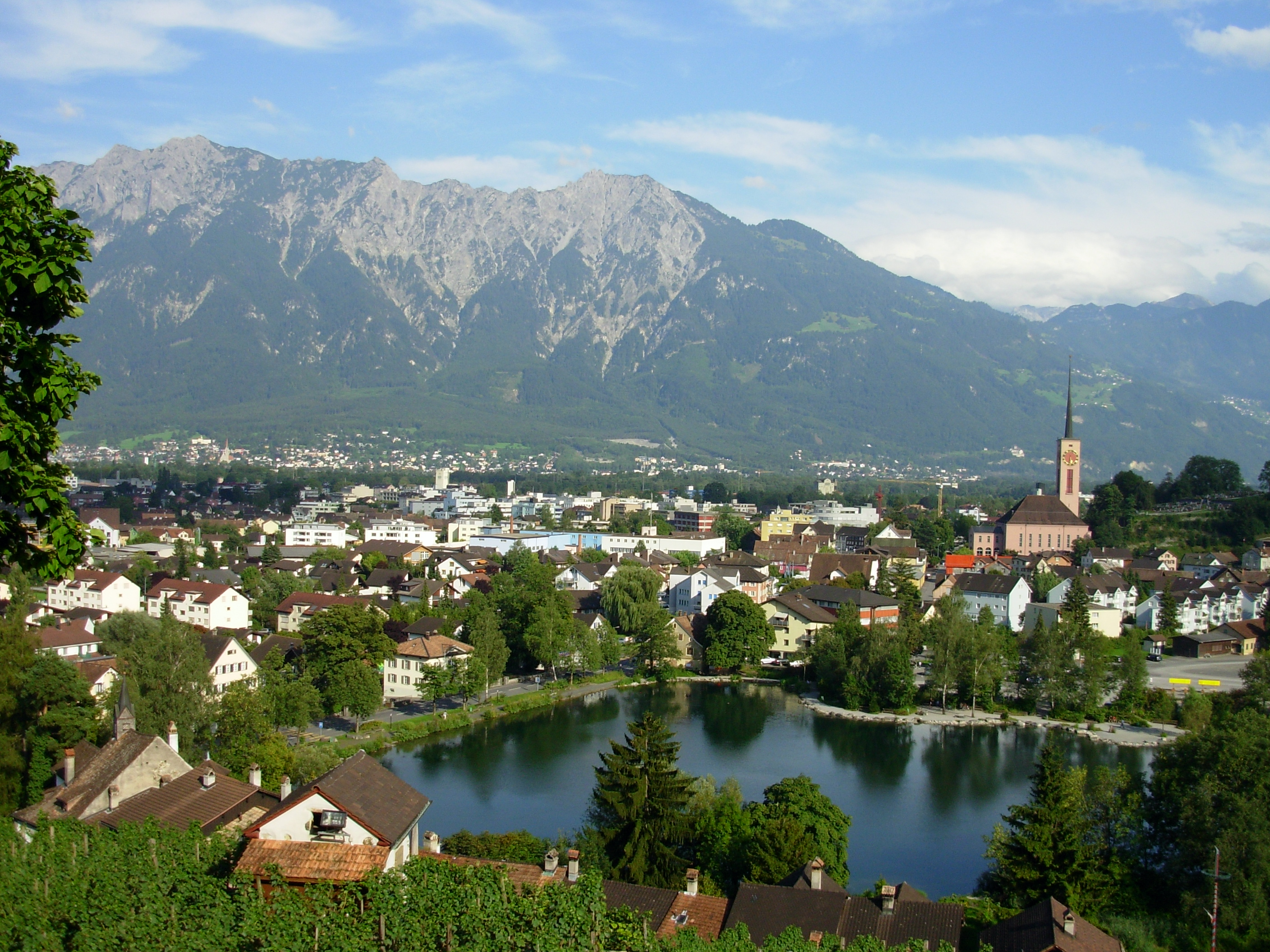
- Buchs

- Flag Coat of arms
- Location of Buchs SG
- Location within Switzerland Location within Canton of St. Gallen
- Coordinates: 47°10′N 9°28′E
- Country: Switzerland
- Canton: St. Gallen
- District: Werdenberg

Government
  - Mayor: Daniel Gut

Area
  - Total: 15.95 km^{2} (6.16 sq mi)
- Elevation: 448 m (1,470 ft)
- Highest elevation (Glannachopf): 2,232 m (7,323 ft)
- Lowest elevation: 441 m (1,447 ft)

Population (December 2020)
  - Total: 13,053
  - Density: 818.4/km^{2} (2,120/sq mi)
- Time zone: UTC+01:00 (CET)
  - Summer (DST): UTC+02:00 (CEST)
- Postal code: 9470
- SFOS number: 3271
- ISO 3166 code: CH-SG
- Surrounded by: Eschen (LI), Gams, Grabs, Schaan (LI), Sennwald, Sevelen, Vaduz (LI)
- Website: www.buchs-sg.ch

Buchs (German pronunciation: [bʊks]) is a municipality in the Wahlkreis (constituency) of Werdenberg in the canton of St. Gallen in Switzerland. It serves as an important economic and transport hub, situated on the border with Liechtenstein. Buchs officially became a town (German: Stadt) in 2002.

== History ==
Buchs is first mentioned in 765 as de Pogio in the testament of the Chur bishop Tello. In 1213 it was mentioned as Buchs, when it was held by the Counts of Werdenberg. From 1404, the Werdenberg estates were a possession of the Counts of Montfort, succeeded by Count John Peter of Sax-Misox in 1483.

In 1517, the area was acquired by the citizens of Glarus who implemented the Protestant Reformation. Buchs was incorporated into the Canton of Linth of the short-lived Napoleonic Helvetic Republic from 1798 to 1803, when it passed to the newly established Canton of St. Gallen.

== Geography ==
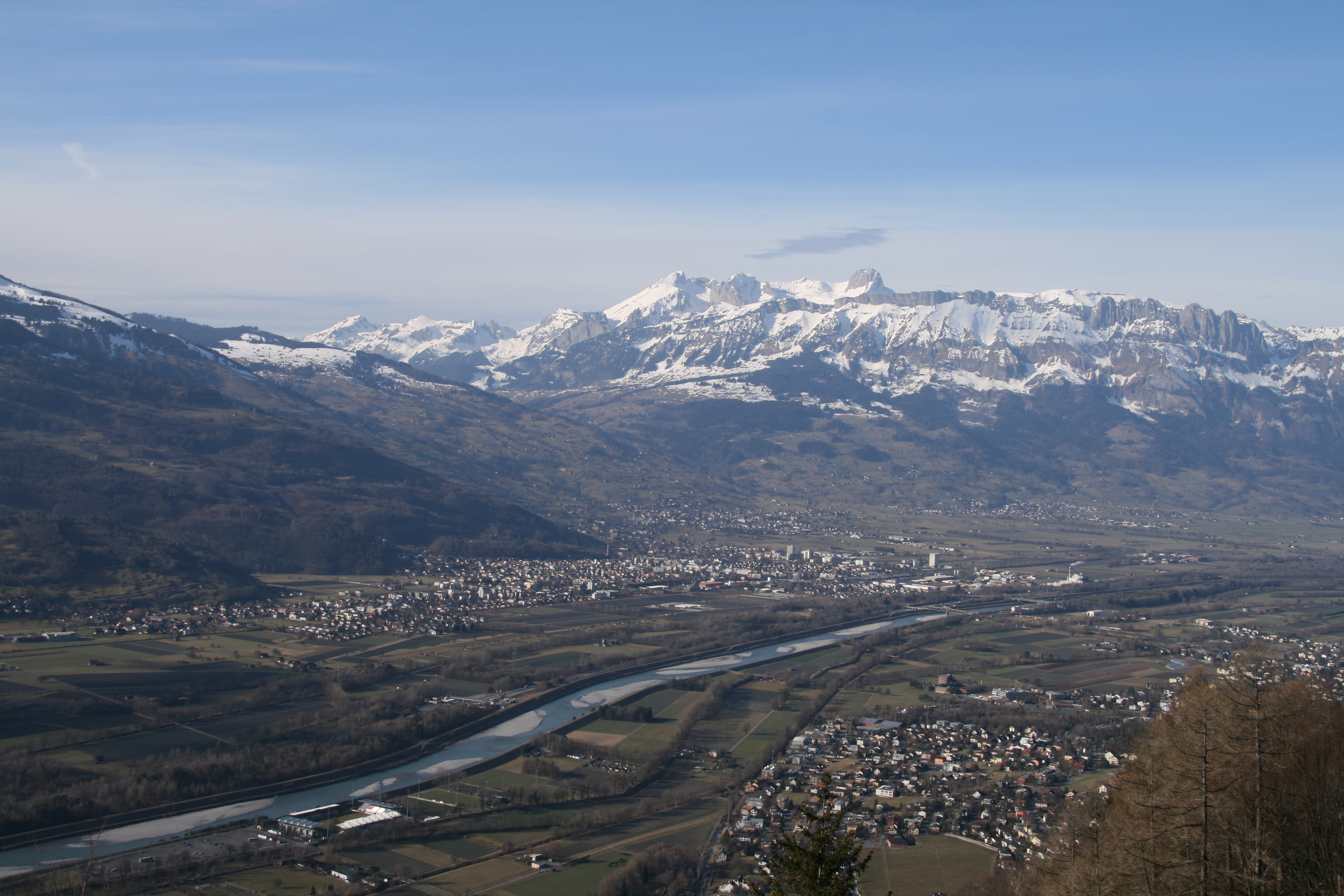
Buchs SG, Grabs SG, Gams SG in Switzerland and Schaan in Liechtenstein

Aerial view from 300 m by Walter Mittelholzer (1919)

Buchs has an area, as of 2006, of 16 km^{2} (6.2 sq mi). Of this area, 39.6% is used for agricultural purposes, while 27.8% is forested. Of the rest of the land, 25.1% is settled (buildings or roads) and the remainder (7.5%) is non-productive (rivers or lakes).

The municipality is located in the Werdenberg Wahlkreis. It is a shopping, industry and services center for the upper St. Gallen Rhine valley (German: Rheintal) as well as the capital of the Wahlkreis. It consists of the village of Buchs and the large hamlets of Räfis and Burgerau as well as scattered settlements on the Buchserberg.

It lies on the border with Liechtenstein, next to the town of Schaan.

== Coat of arms ==
The blazon of the municipal coat of arms is Vert on a Pale Argent a[n] Altar Cloth Sable ringed and fringed Or.

== Demographics ==
Buchs has a population (as of 31 December 2020) of 13,053. As of 2007, about 30.4% of the population was made up of foreign nationals. Of the foreign population, (as of 2000), 181 are from Germany, 412 are from Italy, 1,199 are from ex-Yugoslavia, 189 are from Austria, 168 are from Turkey, and 470 are from another country.

The population has grown at a rate of 5.4%. Most of the population (as of 2000) speaks German (84.9%), with Serbo-Croatian being second most common (3.8%) and Albanian being third (2.9%). Of the Swiss national languages (as of 2000), 8,826 speak German, 62 people speak French, 282 people speak Italian, and 39 people speak Romansh.

The age distribution, as of 2000, in Buchs is; 1,165 children or 11.2% of the population are between 0 and 9 years old and 1,299 teenagers or 12.5% are between 10 and 19. Of the adult population, 1,430 people or 13.8% of the population are between 20 and 29 years old. 1,713 people or 16.5% are between 30 and 39, 1,454 people or 14.0% are between 40 and 49, and 1,335 people or 12.8% are between 50 and 59. The senior population distribution is 969 people or 9.3% of the population are between 60 and 69 years old, 650 people or 6.3% are between 70 and 79, there are 330 people or 3.2% who are between 80 and 89, and there are 54 people or 0.5% who are between 90 and 99.

In 2000 there were 1,687 persons (or 16.2% of the population) who were living alone in a private dwelling. There were 2,285 (or 22.0%) persons who were part of a couple (married or otherwise committed) without children, and 5,070 (or 48.8%) who were part of a couple with children. There were 725 (or 7.0%) people who lived in single parent home, while there are 70 persons who were adult children living with one or both parents, 36 persons who lived in a household made up of relatives, 147 who lived household made up of unrelated persons, and 379 who are either institutionalized or live in another type of collective housing.

In the 2007 federal election the most popular party was the SVP which received 36.3% of the vote. The next three most popular parties were the SP (23%), the FDP (15.8%) and the CVP (9.9%).

The historical population is given in the following table:

year	population
1831	1,781
1850	2,015
1900	3,851
1950	5,204
2000	10,399

== Education ==
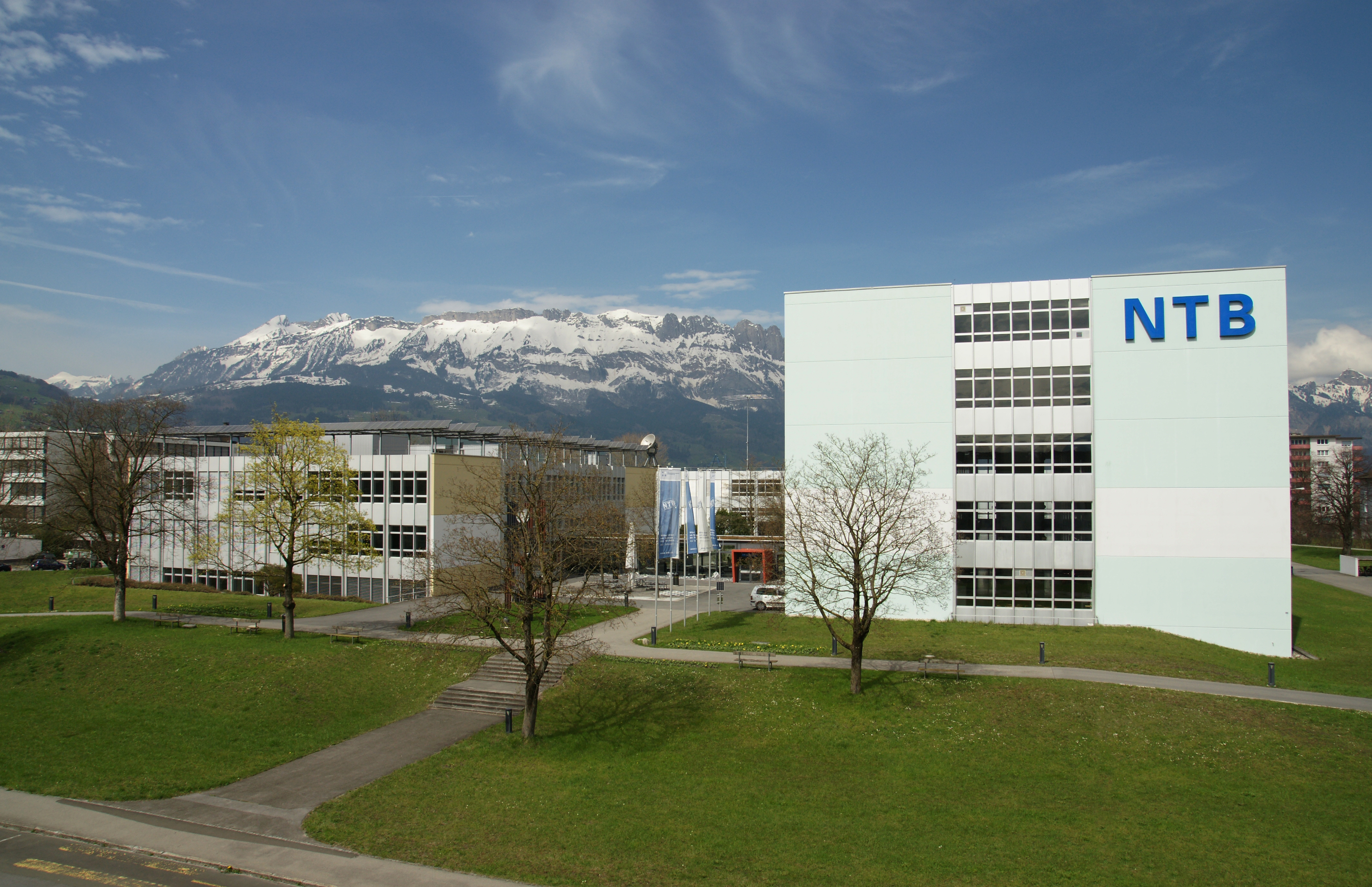
NTB Interstate University of Applied Sciences of Technology Buchs

In Buchs about 65.8% of the population (between age 25–64) have completed either non-mandatory upper secondary education or additional higher education (either university or a Fachhochschule). Out of the total population in Buchs, as of 2000, the highest education level completed by 2,338 people (22.5% of the population) was Primary, while 3,871 (37.2%) have completed Secondary, 1,035 (10.0%) have attended a Tertiary school, and 505 (4.9%) are not in school. The remainder did not answer this question.

Buchs is home to the NTB Interstate University of Applied Sciences of Technology Buchs. The NTB is part of the Fachhochschule Ostschweiz, FHO which is a recognized University of Applied Sciences. NTB offers Bachelor of Science and Master of Science degrees in a few engineering subjects.

The International School Rheintal, Pre K-12, provides instruction in English. It is authorized to offer all three International Baccaulaureate Programs; Primary Years Program, Middle Years Program and the Diploma Program.

== Sights ==
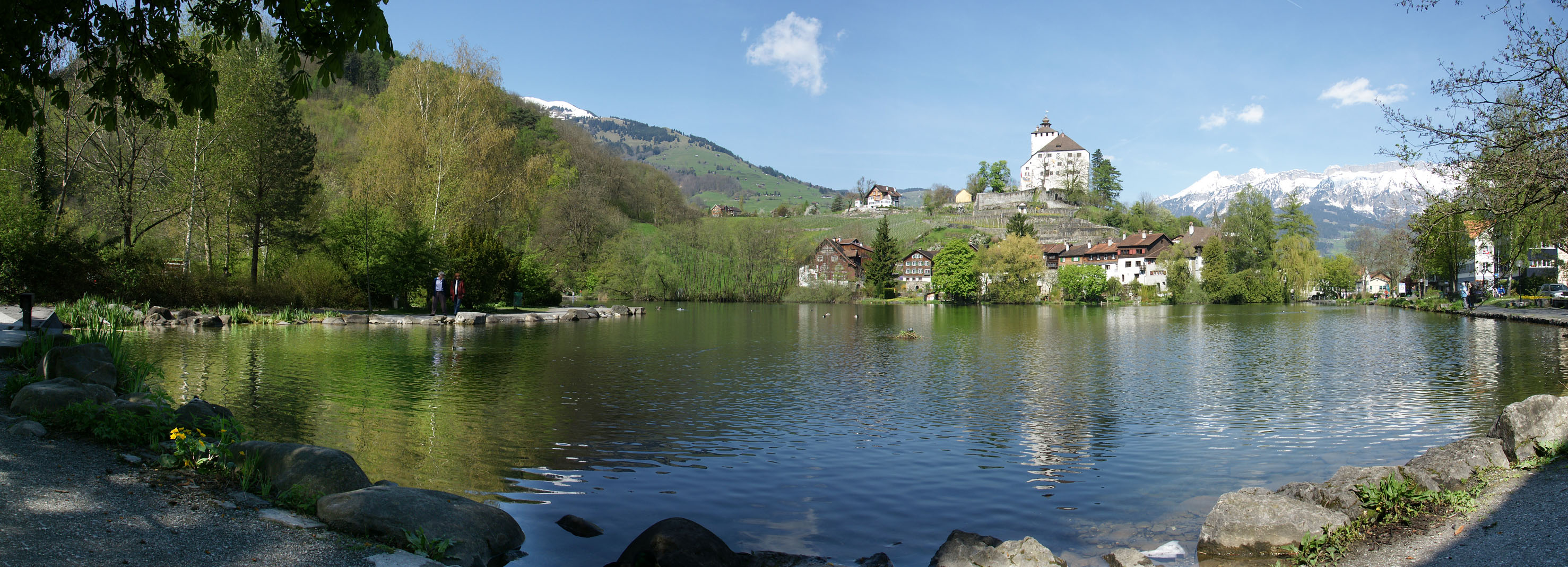
Schloss Werdenberg and Werdenberg lake, looking from Buchs toward Grabs

The region around Schloss Werdenberg, which is shared between Buchs and Grabs, is designated as part of the Inventory of Swiss Heritage Sites.

== Economy ==
As of 2007, Buchs had an unemployment rate of 1.8%. As of 2005, there were 143 people employed in the primary economic sector and about 41 businesses involved in this sector. 1,624 people are employed in the secondary sector and there are 112 businesses in this sector. 4,147 people are employed in the tertiary sector, with 537 businesses in this sector.

As of October 2009 the average unemployment rate was 4.0%. There were 698 businesses in the municipality of which 116 were involved in the secondary sector of the economy while 550 were involved in the third.

The chemical and life science company Sigma-Aldrich was acquired by the German-based Merck Group in 2014. The production site now operates under the name Merck with more than 500 employees and a revenue of > €200 million p.a. in Buchs.

As of 2000 there were 2,671 residents who worked in the municipality, while 2,688 residents worked outside Buchs and 3,641 people commuted into the municipality for work.

== Religion ==
From the 2000 census, 3,524 or 33.9% are Roman Catholic, while 4,287 or 41.2% belonged to the Swiss Reformed Church. Of the rest of the population, there are 6 individuals (or about 0.06% of the population) who belong to the Christian Catholic faith, there are 274 individuals (or about 2.63% of the population) who belong to the Orthodox Church, and there are 304 individuals (or about 2.92% of the population) who belong to another Christian church. There are 939 (or about 9.03% of the population) who are Islamic. There are 68 individuals (or about 0.65% of the population) who belong to another church (not listed on the census), 671 (or about 6.45% of the population) belong to no church, are agnostic or atheist, and 326 individuals (or about 3.13% of the population) did not answer the question.

== Notable residents ==
- Simon Schwendener (1829 in Buchs – 1919), Swiss Botanist and Professor
- Gallus Berger (1903 in Buchs – 1982), politician, member of the National Council of Switzerland
- Walter R. Kramer (1914 in Buchs – 1995), U.S. badminton player
- Heinrich Rohrer, (1933 in Buchs – 2013), Swiss physicist who shared half of the 1986 Nobel Prize in Physics

== See also ==
- Buchs SG railway station
