= Werdenberg (Wahlkreis) =

Coordinates: 47°10′10″N 9°27′41″E

Werdenberg Wahlkreis Werdenberg
- Constituency
- Country: Switzerland
- Canton: St. Gallen

Area
  - Total: 206.48 km^{2} (79.72 sq mi)

Population (December 2020)
  - Total: 39,993
  - Density: 193.69/km^{2} (501.65/sq mi)
- Time zone: UTC+1 (CET)
  - Summer (DST): UTC+2 (CEST)
- Municipalities: 6

Werdenberg (Wahlkreis) or Wahlkreis Werdenberg is a constituency in the canton of St. Gallen in Switzerland. The Wahlkreis (SFOS number 1724) was established on June 10, 2001. The Wahlkreis has its name by the municipality Grabs-Werdenberg.

== Demographics ==
Werdenberg Wahlkreis has a population of 39,993 (as of 31 December 2020). Of the foreign population, (as of 2000), 661 are from Germany, 908 are from Italy, 3,006 are from ex-Yugoslavia, 567 are from Austria, 390 are from Turkey, and 1,124 are from another country. Of the Swiss national languages (as of 2000), 29,264 speak German, 126 people speak French, 648 people speak Italian, and 102 people speak Romansh.

The age distribution, as of 2000, in the Werdenberg Wahlkreis is; 4,097 children or 12.4% of the population are between 0 and 9 years old and 4,662 teenagers or 14.1% are between 10 and 19. Of the adult population, 4,077 people or 12.4% of the population are between 20 and 29 years old. 5,380 people or 16.3% are between 30 and 39, 5,046 people or 15.3% are between 40 and 49, and 4,070 people or 12.3% are between 50 and 59. The senior population distribution is 2,671 people or 8.1% of the population are between 60 and 69 years old, 1,887 people or 5.7% are between 70 and 79, there are 943 people or 2.9% who are between 80 and 89, and there are 169 people or 0.5% who are between 90 and 99, and 2 people who are 100 or more.

In 2000 there were 4,134 persons (or 12.5% of the population) who were living alone in a private dwelling. There were 6,848 (or 20.7%) persons who were part of a couple (married or otherwise committed) without children, and 18,319 (or 55.5%) who were part of a couple with children. There were 1,934 (or 5.9%) people who lived in single parent home, while there are 249 persons who were adult children living with one or both parents, 135 persons who lived in a household made up of relatives, 284 who lived household made up of unrelated persons, and 1,101 who are either institutionalized or live in another type of collective housing.

The entire Swiss population is generally well educated. Out of the total population in Werdenberg Wahlkreis, as of 2000, the highest education level completed by 7,405 people (22.4% of the population) was Primary, while 11,881 (36.0%) have completed Secondary, 3,269 (9.9%) have attended a Tertiary school, and 1,533 (4.6%) are not in school. The remainder did not answer this question.

== Economy ==
As of October 2009 the average unemployment rate was 3.3%.

== Religion ==
From the 2000 census, 11,012 or 33.4% are Roman Catholic, while 14,888 or 45.1% belonged to the Swiss Reformed Church. Of the rest of the population, there are 9 individuals (or about 0.03% of the population) who belong to the Christian Catholic faith, there are 694 individuals (or about 2.10% of the population) who belong to the Orthodox Church, and there are 810 individuals (or about 2.45% of the population) who belong to another Christian church. There are 6 individuals (or about 0.02% of the population) who are Jewish, and 2,411 (or about 7.31% of the population) who are Islamic. There are 199 individuals (or about 0.60% of the population) who belong to another church (not listed on the census), 1,916 (or about 5.81% of the population) belong to no church, are agnostic or atheist, and 1,059 individuals (or about 3.21% of the population) did not answer the question.

== Municipalities ==
Coat of arms	Municipality	Population (31 December 2020)	Area in km^{2}	SFOS number
Buchs	Buchs	13,053	15.95	3271
Gams	Gams	3,587	22.28	3272
Grabs	Grabs	7,220	54.64	3273
Sennwald	Sennwald	5,709	41.53	3274
Sevelen	Sevelen	5,128	30.34	3275
Wartau	Wartau	5,296	41.74	3276
	Total (6)	39,993	206.48	1724

== See also ==
- Municipalities of the canton of St. Gallen
