= Karim Bux =

Indian wrestler

Karim Bux was born in Jammu, India in 1865. He was the first wrestler from the Indian subcontinent to get into world headlines when he defeated Tom Canon of England in 1892. Karim Bux also received the title of Rustam-e-Hind. S Muzumdar, in his classic Strong Men over the Years (Lucknow, 1942), wrote that "The great art of Indian wrestling has its legends but no history whatsoever," and so he chose to start his account of wrestling and wrestlers in 1892, when the English champion Tom Cannon visited India and was defeated by the 21-year-old Kareem Buksh. That, it seems, was the first international contact between the Indian and western schools of professional wrestling.
