= Dagmersellen =

- Municipality
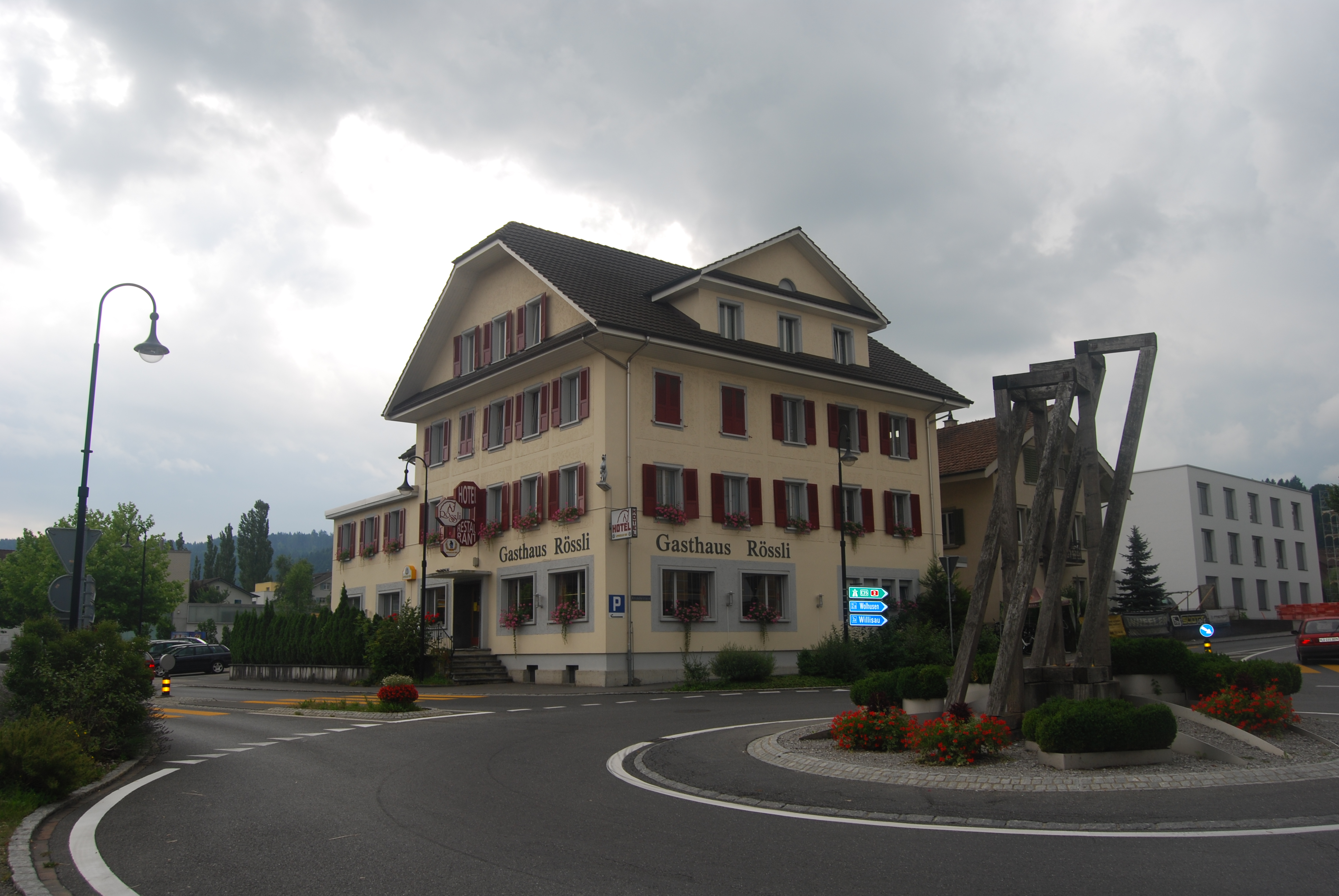

- Coat of arms
- Location of Dagmersellen
- Location within Switzerland Location within Canton of Lucerne
- Coordinates: 47°13′N 7°59′E
- Country: Switzerland
- Canton: Lucerne
- District: Willisau

Area
  - Total: 14.0 km^{2} (5.4 sq mi)
- Elevation: 481 m (1,578 ft)

Population (December 2020)
  - Total: 5,680
  - Density: 406/km^{2} (1,050/sq mi)
- Time zone: UTC+01:00 (CET)
  - Summer (DST): UTC+02:00 (CEST)
- Postal code: 6252
- SFOS number: 1125
- ISO 3166 code: CH-LU
- Localities: Buchs, Uffikon
- Surrounded by: Altishofen, Egolzwil, Knutwil, Mauensee, Nebikon, Reiden, Wauwil, Winikon
- Website: www.dagmersellen.ch

Dagmersellen is a municipality in the district of Willisau in the canton of Lucerne in Switzerland.

On 1 January 2006, the former municipalities of Buchs and Uffikon were merged into Dagmersellen, causing a one-third increase in its population and a marked increase in its territorial area.

== History ==
Dagmersellen is first mentioned around 1070–1090 as Tagmarsellen. In 1173 it was mentioned as Tagemarsseildon.

== Geography ==
Aerial view (1948)

Dagmersellen has an area, as of 2006, of 23.9 km^{2} (9.2 sq mi). Of this area, 54.5% is used for agricultural purposes, while 34% is forested. Of the rest of the land, 10.2% is settled (buildings or roads) and the remainder (1.3%) is non-productive (rivers, glaciers or mountains). In the 1997 land survey, 33.91% of the total land area was forested. Of the agricultural land, 50.86% is used for farming or pastures, while 3.73% is used for orchards or vine crops. Of the settled areas, 3.9% is covered with buildings, 0.88% is industrial, 0.42% is classed as special developments, 0.21% is parks or greenbelts and 4.78% is transportation infrastructure. Of the unproductive areas, 0.17% is unproductive standing water (ponds or lakes), 0.55% is unproductive flowing water (rivers) and 0.59% is other unproductive land.

The municipality is located in the lower Wiggertal, on the A2 motorway between Basel and Lucerne. It consists of the linear village of Dagmersellen.

== Demographics ==
Dagmersellen has a population (as of 31 December 2020) of 5,680. As of 2007, 605 or about 12.5% are not Swiss citizens. Over the last 10 years the population has grown at a rate of 9%. Most of the population (as of 2000) speaks German (91.0%), with Albanian being second most common ( 2.2%) and Italian being third ( 1.6%).

In the 2007 election the most popular party was the CVP which received 37.4% of the vote. The next three most popular parties were the SVP (26.7%), the FDP (24.5%) and the SPS (5.8%).

The age distribution, as of 2008, in Dagmersellen is; 1,112 people or 22.9% of the population is 0–19 years old. 1,514 people or 31.2% are 20–39 years old, and 1,584 people or 32.7% are 40–64 years old. The senior population distribution is 474 people or 9.8% are 65–79 years old, 136 or 2.8% are 80–89 years old and 27 people or 0.6% of the population are 90+ years old.

The entire Swiss population is generally well educated. In Dagmersellen about 66.4% of the population (between age 25-64) have completed either non-mandatory upper secondary education or additional higher education (either University or a Fachhochschule).

As of 2000 there are 1,565 households, of which 412 households (or about 26.3%) contain only a single individual. 206 or about 13.2% are large households, with at least five members. As of 2000 there were 837 inhabited buildings in the municipality, of which 625 were built only as housing, and 212 were mixed use buildings. There were 412 single family homes, 106 double family homes, and 107 multi-family homes in the municipality. Most homes were either two (372) or three (170) story structures. There were only 46 single story buildings and 37 four or more story buildings.

In the 2000 census the religious membership of Dagmersellen was; 3,518 (81.5%) were Roman Catholic, and 346 (8.%) were Protestant, with an additional 107 (2.48%) that were of some other Christian faith. There are 76 individuals (1.76% of the population) who are Muslim. Of the rest; there were 10 (0.23%) individuals who belong to another religion (not listed), 114 (2.64%) who do not belong to any organized religion, 148 (3.43%) who did not answer the question.

The historical population is given in the following table:

year	population
about 1695	ca. 1,050
1798	1,281
1850	2,005
1900	1,761
1950	2,019
2000	3,311

== Industry ==
Over the last decades Dagmersellen has turned from a farming village into an industrial town, attracting domestic and international companies due to its location.

Dagmersellen has an unemployment rate of 1.33%. As of 2005, there were 312 people employed in the primary economic sector and about 106 businesses involved in this sector. 1331 people are employed in the secondary sector and there are 70 businesses in this sector. 839 people are employed in the tertiary sector, with 120 businesses in this sector. As of 2000 52.7% of the population of the municipality were employed in some capacity. At the same time, females made up 40.6% of the workforce.
