= Buchs, Lucerne =

Former municipality, canton of Lucerne

Buchs
- Former municipality
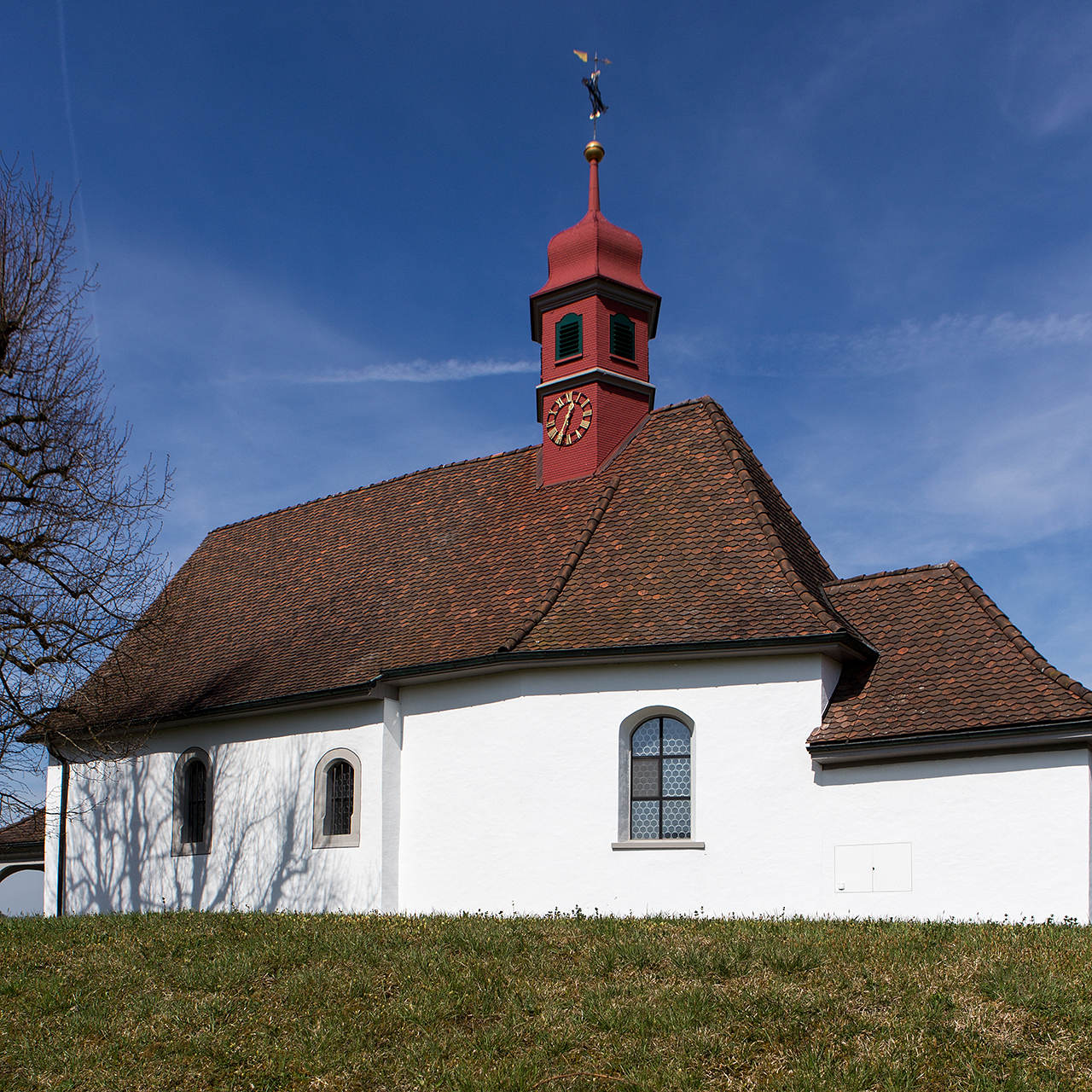
- Chapel of St. Andrew
- Location of Buchs
- Location within Switzerland Location within Canton of Lucerne
- Coordinates: 47°12′7″N 8°2′0″E
- Country: Switzerland
- Canton: Lucerne
- District: Willisau
- Municipality: Dagmersellen

Population (2000)
  - Total: 374
- Time zone: UTC+01:00 (CET)
  - Summer (DST): UTC+02:00 (CEST)
- SFOS number: 1124
- ISO 3166 code: CH-LU
- Website: Profile (in German),

Buchs is a former municipality in the Willisau district of the canton of Lucerne, Switzerland. Since 2006 it has been part of the municipality of Dagmersellen, together with Uffikon. It lies in the upper part of the Hürntal and comprised the village of Buchs and a few scattered farmsteads and groups of houses.

== History ==
Buchs is first mentioned in 1285 as Buchse. Remains of a Roman estate (villa rustica) lie on the south-facing side of the valley. The village chapel of St. Andrew incorporates remains of a castle that had been built into a High Medieval cemetery. For high jurisdiction, Buchs belonged to the Austrian county of Willisau, which came into the possession of the city of Lucerne in 1407. In 1460 Hans Türing von Büttikon gave the bailiwick (Vogtei) of Buchs to the chapter of Zofingen, which attached Buchs to its lordship of Knutwil. Together with Knutwil, Lucerne also acquired the Twing (local lordship) of Buchs in 1579. No local court developed.

The chapel of Buchs was first mentioned in 1371 as a daughter church of the parish church of Altishofen. In 1807 Buchs was transferred to the parish of Uffikon. In 1990 the local economy was still strongly agricultural: 67% of the people working in Buchs were employed in the primary sector.

Around 1695 Buchs had 42 taxpayers (about 250 inhabitants). It had 365 inhabitants in 1798, 583 in 1850, 434 in 1900, 405 in 1950, 330 in 1990 and 374 in 2000.

== Bibliography ==
- F. Blaser, Die Gemeinden des Kantons Luzern, 1949, pp. 34–35
- G. Meyer, Buchs, 1997
- Adolf Reinle, Das Amt Willisau mit St. Urban, 1959, pp. 48–50 (Die Kunstdenkmäler des Kantons Luzern, 5)
