= M. N. Buch =

Indian civil servant and urban planner (1934-2015)

- M. N. Buch planting a tree
- Born: 5 October 1934; Sahiwal, Punjab, British India
- Died: 6 June 2015 (aged 80); Bhopal, Madhya Pradesh, India
- Spouse: Nirmala Buch
- Awards: Padma Bhushan; Man of Vision Award; Aga Khan Award; UNEP Award

Mahesh Neelkanth Buch was an Indian civil servant and urban planner, and helped usher the development of modern Bhopal. The Government of India honored him, in 2011, with Padma Bhushan, the third highest civilian award, for his services to the nation.

== Biography ==
Our Constitution mandates free and fair elections, wrote M. N. Buch, It allows, in fact encourages, different political parties to present their ideology, broad policy framework, specific programmes and agenda of government.

Mahesh N. Buch was born on 5 October 1934, in Sahiwal, pre-partition Punjab. He had his schooling in Lahore and later at Rajkumar College, Rajkot. He graduated in Economics from the St. Stephen's College, Delhi University in 1954 and moved to Pembroke College, Cambridge University for his post graduate studies which he completed in 1956. In 1957, he joined the Indian Administrative Service in the Madhya Pradesh cadre. During 1967–68, he served as the Parvin Fellow at the Woodrow Wilson School of the Princeton University. In 2002, he was conferred the title Doctor of Science (DSc) from the Rajiv Gandhi Technical University. He held several important portfolios in his career such as Principal Secretary in Madhya Pradesh.

Buch took voluntary retirement from the government service, as the Principal Secretary of the State Government, in 1984, and founded the NGO, the National Centre for Human Settlements and Environment, Bhopal for which he served as the Chairman.

Buch died on 6 June 2015 succumbing to a paralytic attack which followed cardiac problems. He was married to Nirmala, a government servant who worked as the adviser to the Chief Minister under the Uma Bharati government and the couple had a son, Vineet. The family lived in Bhopal at the time of his death.

== Positions held ==
In a democracy, no one person can be a decision maker. The decisions have to be taken collectively. Democracy works on the basis of the interest of various groups and the number of compromises that must be made, wrote M. N. Buch in his article, Excellence in Administration , This is the reality of administration in India.

M. N. Buch held several government positions of authority during his civil service such as the post of the District Collector, District Magistrate, Director, Government Secretary and the Commissioner of various departments such as Tribal Welfare, Housing, Forests and Town country planning. Some of the other positions are:

- Vice Chairman - Delhi Development Authority
- Director General of the National Institute of Urban Affairs
- Vice-Chairman - National Commission on Urbanization
- Chairman - Lutyens Bungalow Zone Committee of the Government of India
- Chairman - Committee on the Heritage Zone of Mehrauli
- Chairman - Empowered Committee for the New Vidhan Sabha building in Madhya Pradesh
- Chairman - Board of Governors ABV – Indian Institute of Information Technology and Management, Gwalior
- Dean - Centre for Governance and Political Studies
- Chairman - National Centre for Human Settlements and Environment
- Chairman - Atal Bihari Vajpayee Indian Institute of Information Technology and Management

== Personal traits and legacy ==
Buch has been reported to be a straight-talking, no nonsense bureaucrat. He was credited with the initial efforts in the modernization of Bhopal. The organization he founded, the National Centre for Human Settlements and Environment, focusses on the sustainable development of settlements in a holistic manner.

== Awards and recognitions ==
- Padma Bhushan - 2011
- Man of Vision Award - the Hindustan Times - 2003
- Aga Khan Award - 1998
- UNEP Award - 1995

== Writings ==
M. N. Buch has written four books on urban planning.

- M. N. Buch (2008). When the Harvest Moon is Blue. Har Anand Publications. ISBN 978-8124114094.
- M. N. Buch (1993). 978-8172030049. Stosius Inc/Advent Books Division. p. 81. ISBN 978-0863113765.
- M. N. Buch (1991). Of man and his settlements. Sanchar Pub. House. p. 342. ISBN 978-8172030049.
- M. N. Buch (1987). Planning the Indian City. Vikas Publications. ISBN 978-0706933963.

M. N. Buch has also been a writer of articles, which have been published in many leading publications; a few of the articles are:

- Dr. M. N. Buch (Oct 2012). "Is Verrier Elwin Still Relevant? –A Study of the Bhils of Jhabua". Vivekananda International Foundation.
- Dr. M. N. Buch (July 2014). "Union Budget 2014-2015: Breathing Time to Evolve Long Term Economic Policy". Vivekananda International Foundation.
- Dr. M. N. Buch (July 2014). "Juvenile Justice Act: Does It Need Review". Vivekananda International Foundation.
- Dr. M. N. Buch (March 2014). "Creation of Telangana: Do Small States Pose A Threat to National Integration?". Vivekananda International Foundation.
- Dr. M. N. Buch (April 2014). "Time to Restore Civility in Political Debate". Vivekananda International Foundation.
- Dr. M. N. Buch (June 2014). "Time for an Organised, Focused and Empowered CBI". Vivekananda International Foundation.
- Dr. M. N. Buch (July 2014). "Appointment of Judges and Independence of Judiciary". Vivekananda International Foundation.
