= Idit Buch =

Israeli computational biologist

Idit Buch (Hebrew: עידית בוך) is a computational biologist who is the Vice President of Computational Biology at EmendoBio.

== Education ==
Buch earned her Ph.D. In computer biology from Tel Aviv University (TAU) in 2011. Her advisors were Ruth Nussinov and Haim J. Wolfson. Her thesis was entitled In Silico Design, Construction & Validation of Protein Nanostructures. She also has a M.Sc. in Computer Science and B.A. in Computer Science and is a pianist trained at the Academy of Music all from TAU.

== Career ==
At EmendoBio, Buch is responsible for the computational group that she established there that is developing new projects as well as the algorithms and pipelines to help the company meet its computational biology needs. To do so, she build infrastructure with significant scalability.

== Select publications ==
- Buch, Idit; Brooks, Bernard R.; Wolfson, Haim J.; Nussinov, Ruth (2009-03-11). "Computational Validation of Protein Nanotubes". Nano Letters. 9 (3): 1096–1102. doi:10.1021/nl803521j. ISSN 1530-6984. PMC 3536542. PMID 19199488.
