= Buch, Kentucky =

Unincorporated community in Kentucky, United States

Bunch, Kentucky
- Unincorporated community
- Location in Kentucky Location in the United States
- Coordinates: 37°5′59″N 84°14′11″W
- Country: United States
- State: Kentucky
- County: Laurel
- Elevation: 1,142 ft (348 m)
- Time zone: UTC-5 (Eastern (EST))
  - Summer (DST): UTC-4 (EST)
- GNIS feature ID: 511060

Bunch is an unincorporated community in Laurel County, Kentucky, United States. It is also known as Dog Branch.
