= Tomás Buch =

Argentine chemist and technologist

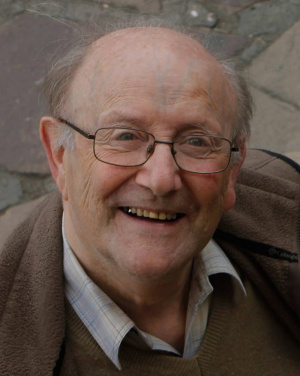
- Tomás Buch
- Born: July 7, 1931; Germany
- Died: March 5, 2017 (aged 85); Argentina
- Scientific career
- Fields: Chemistry
- Workplaces: CNEA

Tomás Buch (July 7, 1931 – March 5, 2017) was an Argentine chemist and technologist.

At 7 years old, on September 9, 1938, arrives in Argentina on the ship Florida. In 1955 he settled in San Carlos de Bariloche (province of Río Negro) to be part of the teaching staff of the newly created Institute of Physics Bariloche (today Balseiro Institute) as assistant Chemistry and associate researcher of CNEA

In 1976 he was one of the creators of INVAP.

He is the author of the book "De los quipus a los satélites : historia de la tecnología en la Argentina"

== Bibliography ==
- El Tecnoscopio (Aique Grupo Editor, 1996, con varias reediciones).
- Sistemas Tecnológicos (Aique Grupo Editor, 1999).
- Tecnología en la vida cotidiana (Editorial Eudeba, 2004).
- De los quipus a los satélites: historia de la tecnología en la Argentina, en colaboración con Carlos E. Solivérez (Editorial de la Universidad Nacional de Quilmes, 2011).
- Desarrollo y ecopolítica: los grandes debates de la tecnología, el ambiente y la sociedad (Lenguaje Claro Editora, 2013).

== See also ==
- CNEA
- INVAP
