= Bucks =

Bucks may refer to:

== Places ==
- Buckinghamshire, England, abbreviated Bucks
- Bucks, Alabama, United States, an unincorporated community
- Bucks, Illinois, United States, an unincorporated community
- Bucks, Michigan, an unincorporated community
- Bucks County, Pennsylvania, United States
  - Bucks County Community College
- Bucks Township, Ohio, United States

== Sports teams ==
- Milwaukee Bucks, a team in the National Basketball Association
- Laredo Bucks, a team in the Central Hockey League
- Flint City Bucks, a soccer team playing in the USL Premier Development League
- Waterloo Bucks, a baseball team playing in the summer-collegiate Northwoods League
- Ohio State Buckeyes, the intercollegiate sports teams representing the Ohio State University
- Buckinghamshire County Cricket Club, in the domestic cricket structure of England and Wales

== As a nickname ==
- John Buckley (Glen Rovers hurler) (born 1958), Irish former hurler
- Nathan Buckley (born 1972), former Australian rules football player, commentator and coach
- The Young Bucks, American professional wrestling tag team

== Other ==
- Buck's night, Australian term for bachelor party
- Buck's Club, London
- Buck's of Woodside, famed Silicon Valley restaurant
- Racist slang for a male Native American
- Colloquialism for dollars

== See also ==
- Beta Upsilon Chi, a Christian fraternity that has adopted letters BYX, pronounced "bucks"
- Buck (disambiguation)
- Bucs (disambiguation)
- Bux (disambiguation)
