= Grabs, Switzerland =

Grabs
- Municipality
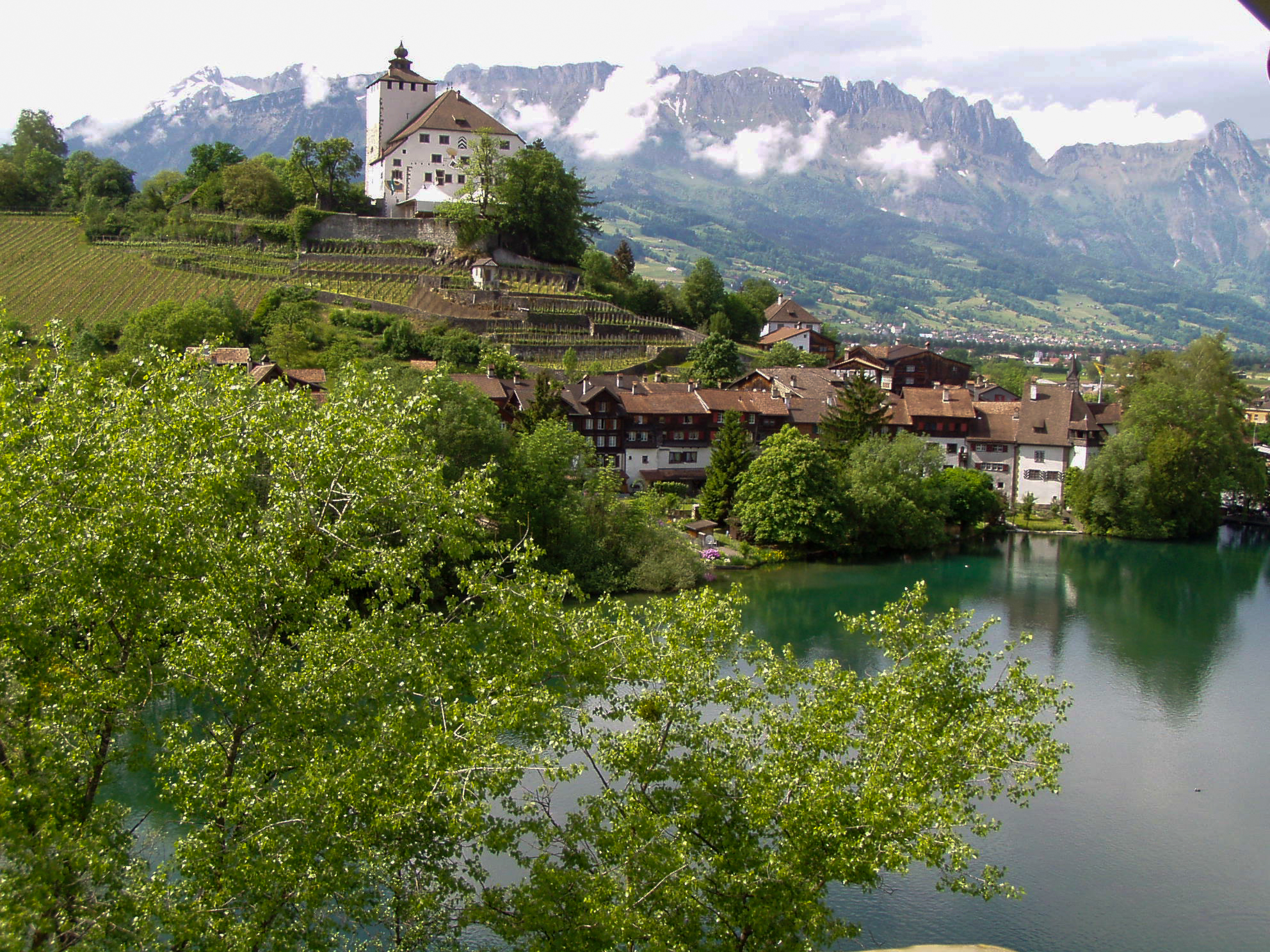
- Werdenberg village

- Coat of arms
- Location of Grabs
- Location within Switzerland Location within Canton of St. Gallen
- Coordinates: 47°11′N 9°27′E
- Country: Switzerland
- Canton: St. Gallen
- District: Werdenberg

Government
  - Mayor: Rudolf Lippuner

Area
  - Total: 54.64 km^{2} (21.10 sq mi)
- Elevation: 465 m (1,526 ft)

Population (December 2020)
  - Total: 7,220
  - Density: 132/km^{2} (342/sq mi)
- Time zone: UTC+01:00 (CET)
  - Summer (DST): UTC+02:00 (CEST)
- Postal code: 9472
- SFOS number: 3273
- ISO 3166 code: CH-SG
- Surrounded by: Alt Sankt Johann, Buchs, Gams, Sevelen, Walenstadt, Wildhaus
- Website: www.grabs.ch

Grabs is a municipality in the Wahlkreis (constituency) of Werdenberg in the canton of St. Gallen in Switzerland.

== History ==
Grabs is first mentioned in 841 as Quaravedes. In 979 it was mentioned as Quadravedes, then in 1235 as Grabdis and in 1253 as Graps.

== Geography ==
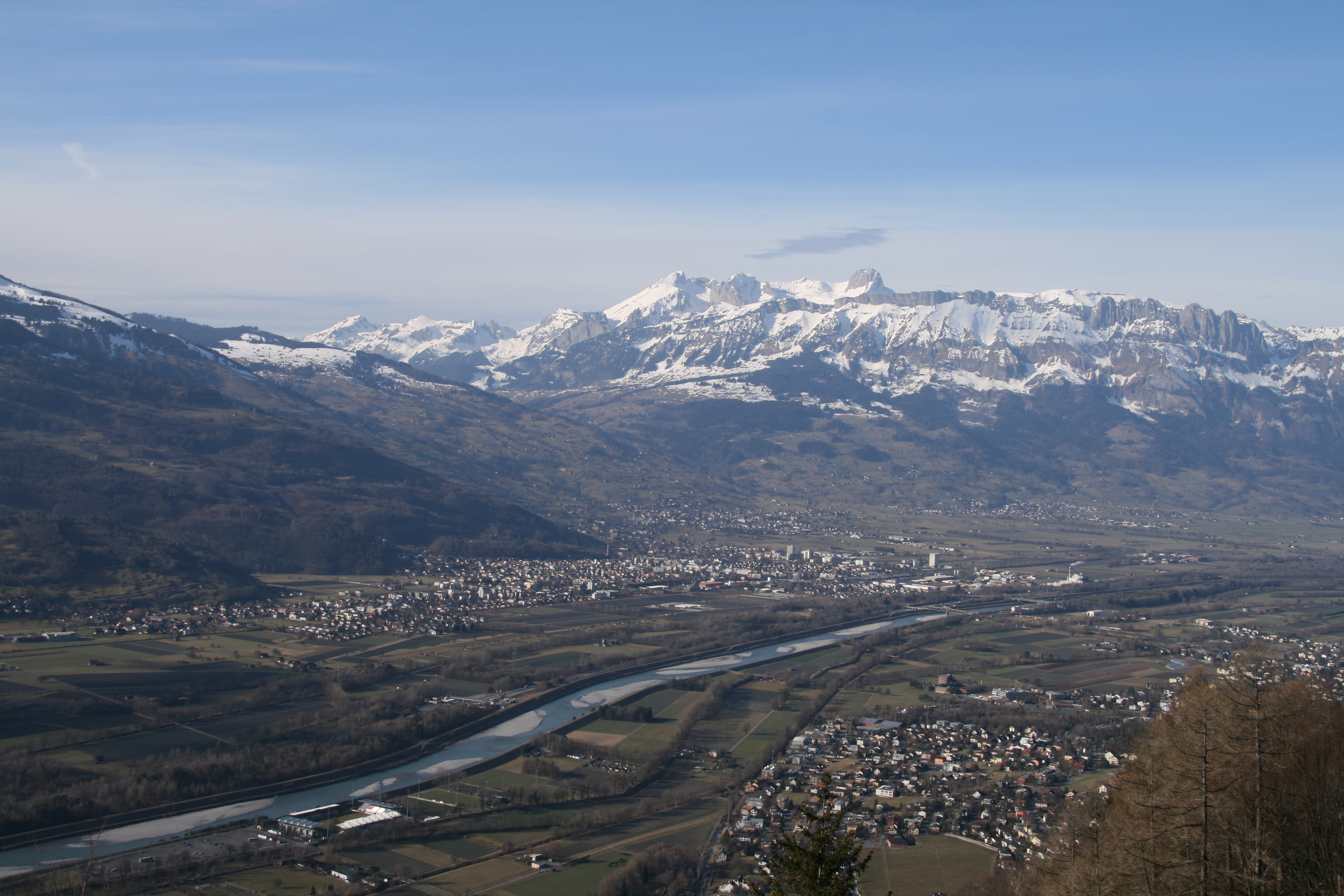
Clockwise, from left: Buchs SG, Grabs SG, Gams SG in Switzerland and Schaan in Liechtenstein

Aerial view from 400 m by Walter Mittelholzer (1922)

Grabs has an area, as of 2006, of 54.7 km^{2} (21.1 sq mi). Of this area, 50% is used for agricultural purposes, while 32.2% is forested. Of the rest of the land, 4.8% is settled (buildings or roads) and the remainder (12.9%) is non-productive (rivers or lakes).

The municipality is located in the Werdenberg Wahlkreis. The eastern portion of the municipality is on edge of the Rhine valley, but doesn't reach the Rhine. The larger part of the municipality is on the eastern slope of the Churfirsten-Alvier group. It consists of the village of Grabs, scattered settlements on the Grabserberg with the hamlets of Forst, Lehn and Schluss, the village section of Studen, the scattered settlement of Studnerberg and the little city of Werdenberg. It also includes lightly settled alpine pastures on the broad Maiensässgürtel.

The city of Werdenberg with its castle (Schloss Werdenberg) is part of the municipality.

Voralpsee and Werdenbergersee are located in the municipality.

== Coat of arms ==
The blazon of the municipal coat of arms is Argent a Wild Man statant afrontee holding a Club in dexter and a Pine Tree eradicated Vert in sinister.

== Demographics ==
Grabs has a population (as of 31 December 2020) of 7,220. As of 2007, about 16.1% of the population was made up of foreign nationals. Of the foreign population, (as of 2000), 132 are from Germany, 77 are from Italy, 365 are from ex-Yugoslavia, 112 are from Austria, 56 are from Turkey, and 135 are from another country. Over the last 10 years the population has grown at a rate of 5.2%. Most of the population (as of 2000) speaks German (93.0%), with Albanian being second most common (1.7%) and Serbo-Croatian being third (1.7%). Of the Swiss national languages (as of 2000), 5,854 speak German, 17 people speak French, 58 people speak Italian, and 13 people speak Romansh.

The age distribution, as of 2000, in Grabs is; 777 children or 12.3% of the population are between 0 and 9 years old and 914 teenagers or 14.5% are between 10 and 19. Of the adult population, 639 people or 10.1% of the population are between 20 and 29 years old. 1,038 people or 16.5% are between 30 and 39, 999 people or 15.9% are between 40 and 49, and 798 people or 12.7% are between 50 and 59. The senior population distribution is 486 people or 7.7% of the population are between 60 and 69 years old, 372 people or 5.9% are between 70 and 79, there are 216 people or 3.4% who are between 80 and 89, and there are 56 people or 0.9% who are between 90 and 99, and 2 people or 0.0% who are 100 or more.

In 2000 there were 671 persons (or 10.7% of the population) who were living alone in a private dwelling. There were 1,282 (or 20.4%) persons who were part of a couple (married or otherwise committed) without children, and 3,607 (or 57.3%) who were part of a couple with children. There were 355 (or 5.6%) people who lived in single parent home, while there are 48 persons who were adult children living with one or both parents, 31 persons who lived in a household made up of relatives, 52 who lived household made up of unrelated persons, and 251 who are either institutionalized or live in another type of collective housing.

In the 2007 federal election the most popular party was the SVP which received 32.9% of the vote. The next three most popular parties were the SP (19.9%), the FDP (19.5%) and the CVP (9.6%).

The entire Swiss population is generally well educated. In Grabs about 70.5% of the population (between age 25-64) have completed either non-mandatory upper secondary education or additional higher education (either university or a Fachhochschule). Out of the total population in Grabs, as of 2000, the highest education level completed by 1,424 people (22.6% of the population) was Primary, while 2,206 (35.0%) have completed Secondary, 701 (11.1%) have attended a Tertiary school, and 290 (4.6%) are not in school. The remainder did not answer this question.

The historical population is given in the following table:

year	population
1816	2,354
1850	3,272
1900	4,411
1950	4,516
2000	6,297

== Heritage sites of national significance ==
There are several sites and five houses in Grabs municipality that are listed as Swiss heritage sites of national significance. The mill, saw mill, wool washing station and hammermill on Glockenweg are listed as a single site. The fortifications around Werdenberg and Werdenberg Castle are also on the list. The five houses include; row houses on Städtli 2–7, the Schlangenhaus at Städtli 14, houses at Städtli 16 and 23 as well as the double house at Städtli 24/25.

The region around Schloss Werdenberg, which is shared between Buchs and Grabs, is designated as part of the Inventory of Swiss Heritage Sites.

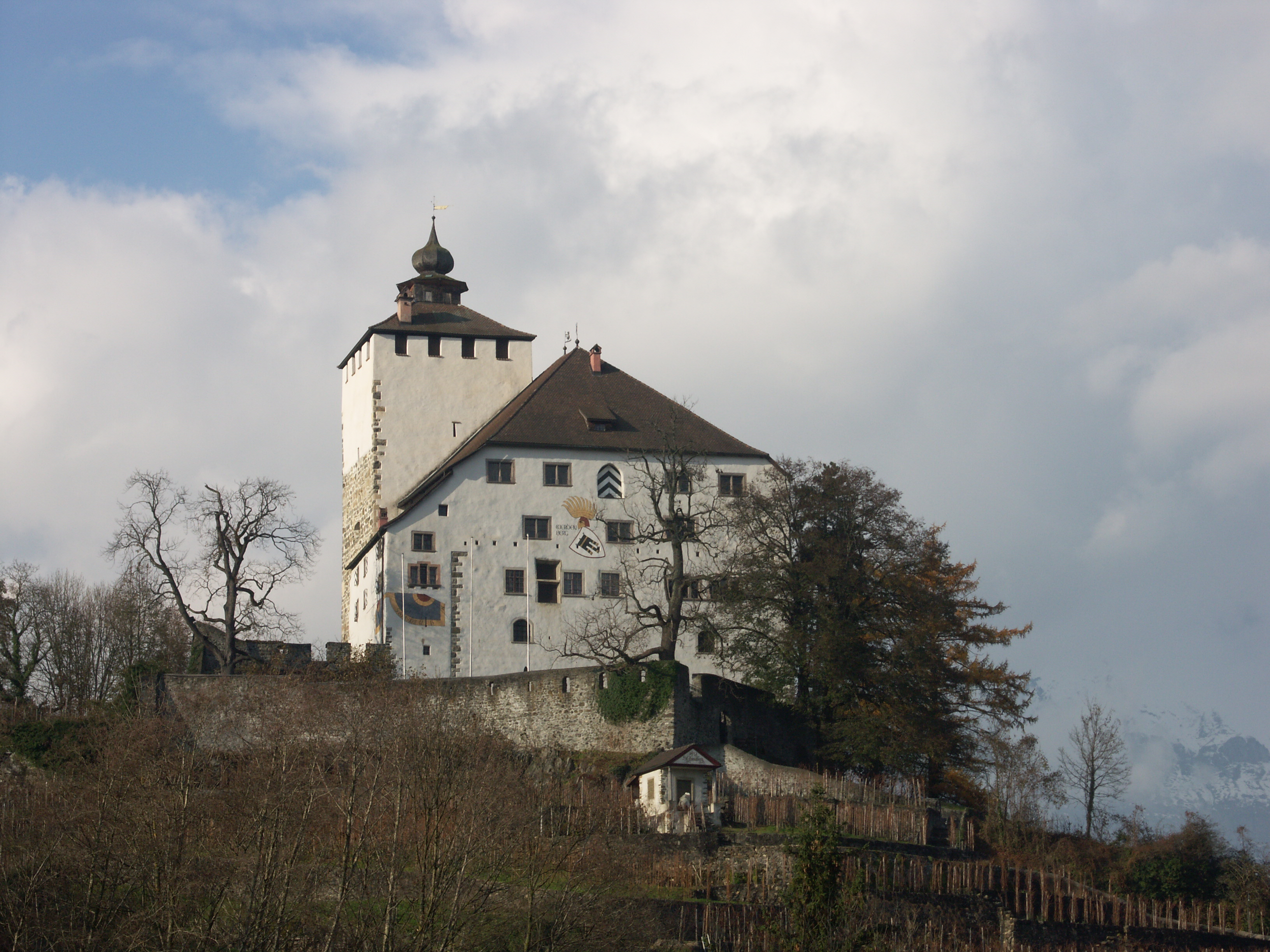
Werdenberg Castle

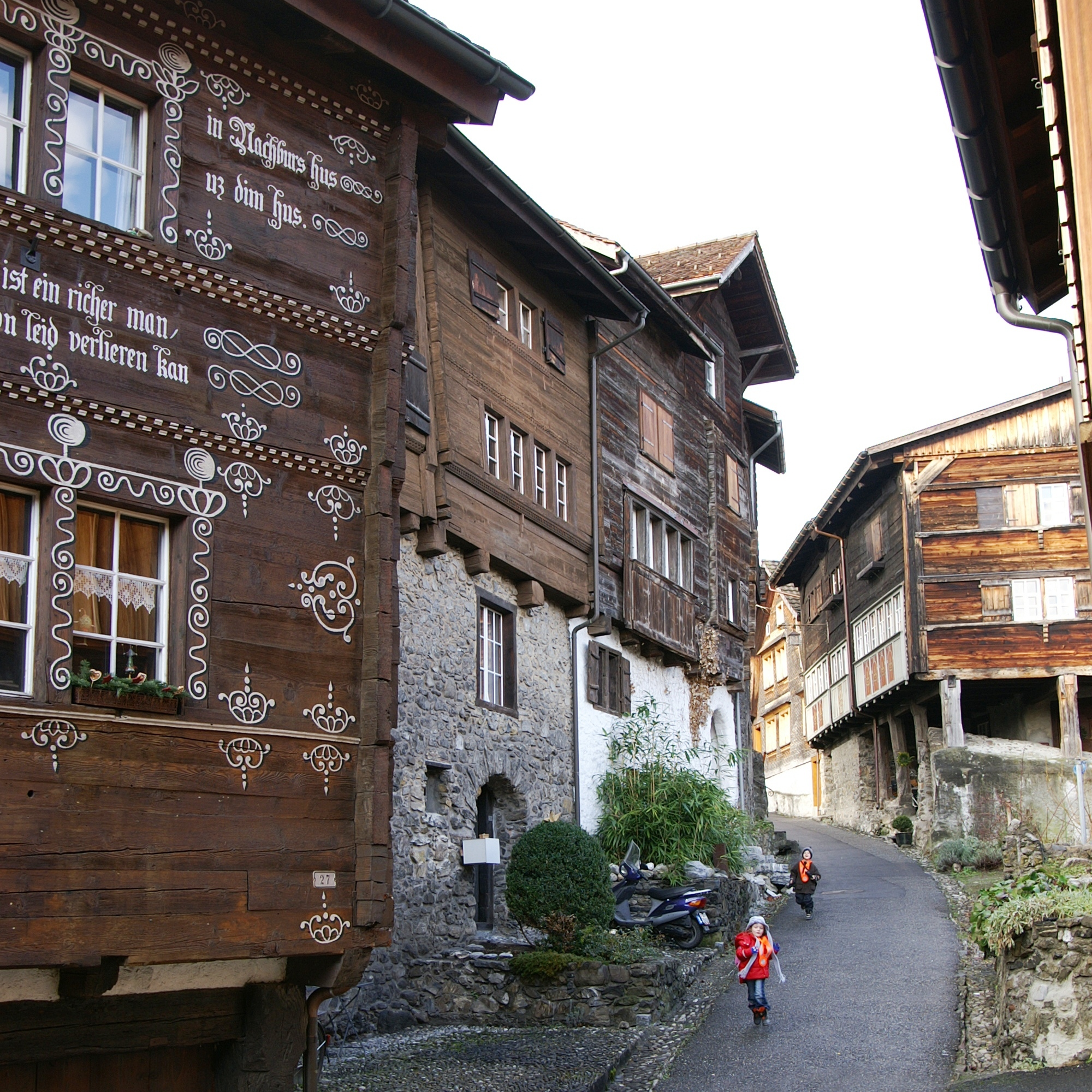
Part of the Double House at Städtli 24/25

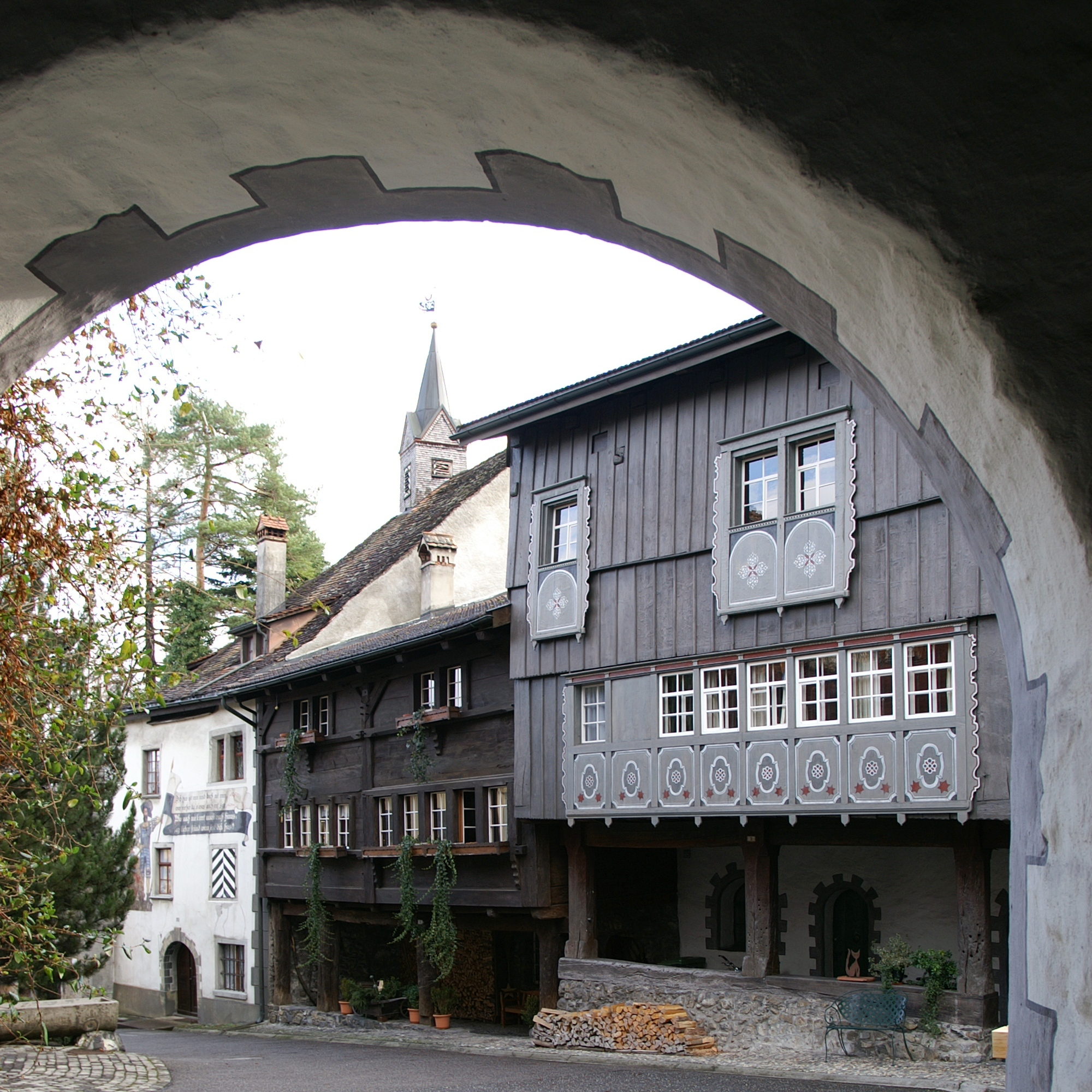
Part of Werdenberg's Fortifications

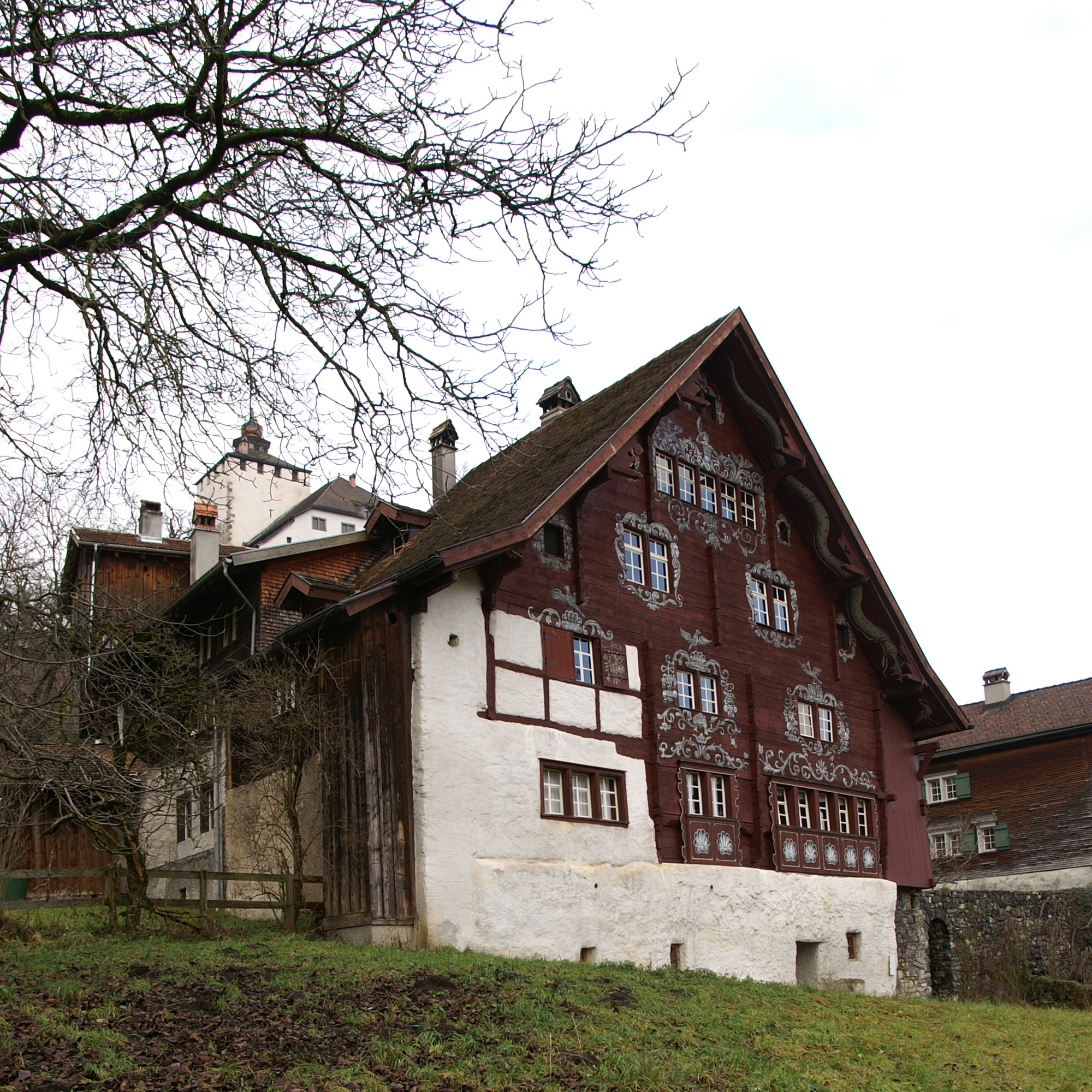
Schlangenhaus at Städtli 14

== Economy ==
As of 2007, Grabs had an unemployment rate of 0.86%. As of 2005, there were 290 people employed in the primary economic sector and about 109 businesses involved in this sector. 1,260 people are employed in the secondary sector and there are 66 businesses in this sector. 1,360 people are employed in the tertiary sector, with 165 businesses in this sector.

As of October 2009 the average unemployment rate was 2.3%. There were 325 businesses in the municipality of which 65 were involved in the secondary sector of the economy while 163 were involved in the third.

As of 2000 there were 1,459 residents who worked in the municipality, while 1,784 residents worked outside Grabs and 1,357 people commuted into the municipality for work.

== Religion ==
From the 2000 census, 1,642 or 26.1% are Roman Catholic, while 3,561 or 56.6% belonged to the Swiss Reformed Church. Of the rest of the population, there is 1 individual who belongs to the Christian Catholic faith, there are 92 individuals (or about 1.46% of the population) who belong to the Orthodox Church, and there are 193 individuals (or about 3.06% of the population) who belong to another Christian church. There are 2 individuals (or about 0.03% of the population) who are Jewish, and 251 (or about 3.99% of the population) who are Islamic. There are 16 individuals (or about 0.25% of the population) who belong to another church (not listed on the census), 323 (or about 5.13% of the population) belong to no church, are agnostic or atheist, and 216 individuals (or about 3.43% of the population) did not answer the question.

== Notable people ==
- Fridolin Sulser (1926 in Grabs – 2016), a Swiss-American pharmacologist who specialized in the treatment of mental disorders.
- Hans-Jörg Rheinberger (born 1946 in Grabs), an historian of science who now comes from Liechtenstein
- Pipilotti Rist (born 1962), a visual artist, creates experiential video art and installation art that portrays self-portraits and singing
- Princess Marie-Caroline of Liechtenstein (born 1996), member of the Liechtenstein princely family

Sport

- Ursula Konzett (born 1959 in Grabs), a former Alpine skier for Liechtenstein.
- Petra Wenzel (born 1961 in Grabs, Saint Gallen), a Liechtenstein former alpine skier who competed in the 1980 and 1984 Winter Olympics
- Oliver Geissmann (born 1978 in Grabs), a Liechtensteiner sport shooter, specializing in the 10 metre air rifle, competed at the Summer Olympics in 2000, 2004 and 2008
- Martin Stocklasa (born 1979), a retired naturalized Liechtenstein football defender and current manager of the Liechtenstein national under-21 football team.
- Simon Ammann (born 1981 in Grabs), a Swiss ski jumper, won four individual Winter Olympic gold medals in 2002 and 2010
- Michael Klingler (born 1983 in Grabs), a Swiss-born bobsledder for Liechtenstein, competed at the 2010 Winter Olympics
- Gerardo Clemente (born 1984 in Grabs), a Swiss football player
- Marianne Kaufmann-Abderhalden (born 1986), a retired World Cup alpine ski racer
