= Anisur Khuda-Bukhsh =

Indian homeopathy researcher

Anisur Rahman Khuda-Bukhsh (born 26 September 1948) is a professor of zoology at the University of Kalyani in West Bengal, India, and a homeopathy researcher. In 2003, he published a study which claimed that homeopathic Arsenicum album reduced arsenic-caused liver toxicity in mice. He has also done research on treating arsenic-induced diabetes in mice using a product consisting of insulin wrapped in a coat of nanoparticles; Khuda-Bukhsh and his collaborators describe this product as "nano-insulin". Nature Asia describes an article published in peer review journal of Integrative Medicine about the action of homeopathy in gene expression.
