= Werdenberg Castle =

Castle in Grabs, Switzerland

- Grabs
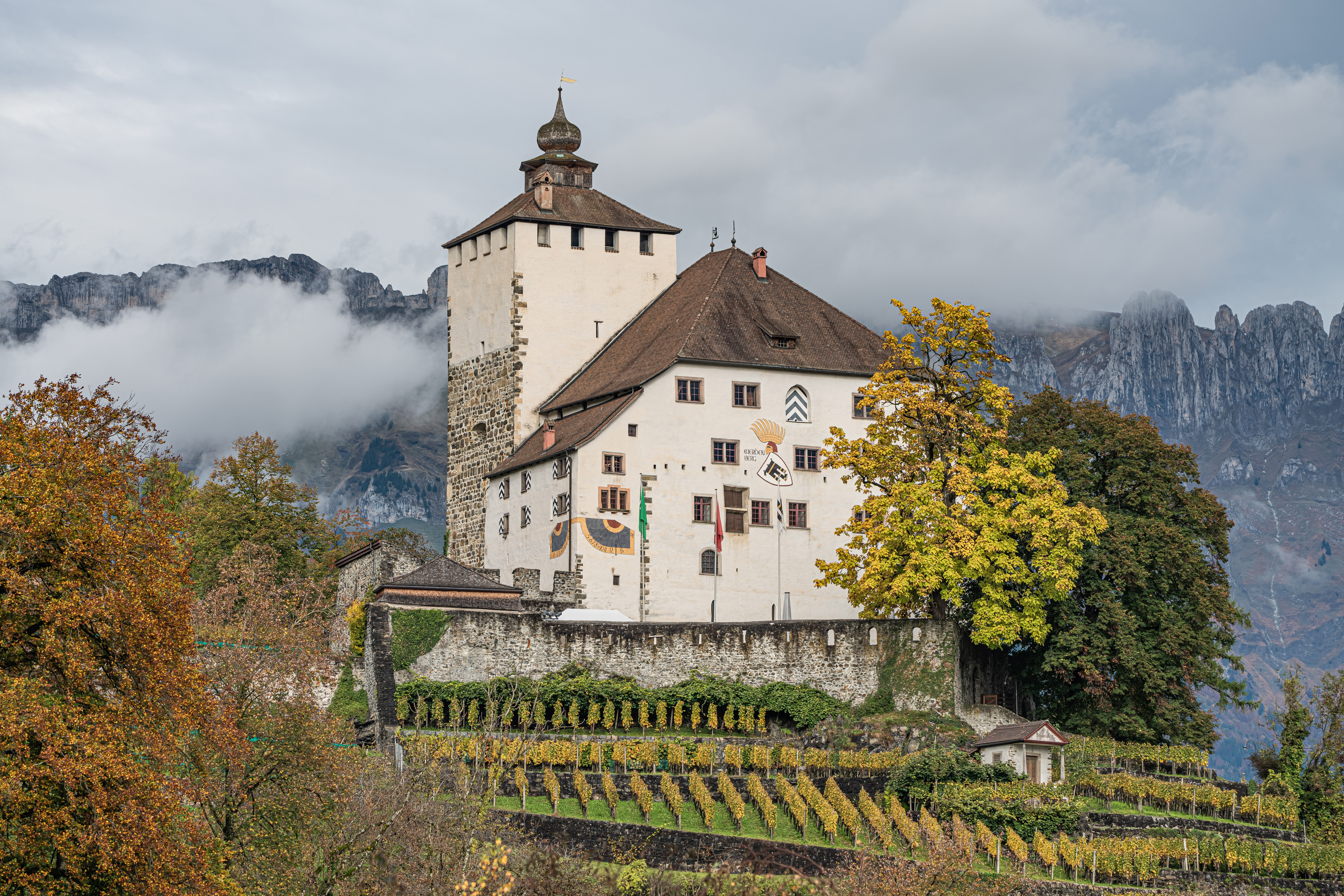
- Werdenberg Castle

Site information
- Type: hill castle
- Code: CH-SG
- Condition: preserved or largely preserved

Location
- Coordinates: 47°10′07″N 9°27′42″E

Site history
- Built: 1228

Garrison information
- Occupants: counts

Werdenberg Castle is a castle in the municipality of Grabs of the Canton of St. Gallen in Switzerland. It is a Swiss heritage site of national significance.

It was the original seat of the County of Werdenberg in the Holy Roman Empire.

== See also ==
- List of castles in Switzerland
