= Dickins =

Dickins is a surname. Notable people with the surname include:

- Alan Dickins, Arundel Herald of Arms Extraordinary
- Barry Dickins (born 1949), Australian author, artist and playwright
- Bruce Dickins FBA (1889–1978), Elrington and Bosworth Professor of Anglo-Saxon, Cambridge University
- Frederick Victor Dickins (1838–1915), British surgeon, barrister, orientalist and university administrator
- George Dickins (1821–1903), English cricketer and soldier
- John Dickins (1746–1798), early Methodist preacher in the United States
- Matt Dickins (born 1970), English professional goalkeeper
- Michael Dickins Ford (1928–2018), art director in film and commercial television
- Punch Dickins OC OBE DFC (1899–1995), pioneering Canadian aviator and bush pilot
- Rob Dickins (born 1950), formerly chairman of Warner Music UK, founder of Instant Karma and Dharma Music
- William Dickins, Anglican archdeacon
- Zara Dickins DBE (1909–1989), Australian fashion designer, wife (later widow) of Prime Minister Harold Holt of Australia

== See also ==
- Dickens (disambiguation)
  - Charles Dickens, English writer
- Dickins & Jones or Dickins & Jones, high-quality department store in London, England
- Dillon & Dickins, Dance music production group based in London, United Kingdom
