= Dicken =

Dicken may refer to:

- Dicken, St. Gallen, a hamlet in Neckertal, St. Gallen, Switzerland
- a type of silver coin of the 15th to 18th centuries, viz. "thick" silver coins minted based after the Italian fashion of the silver Testone introduced in the 1470s. First used in Switzerland (Berne 1482), in the 17th century minted throughout the Holy Roman Empire most often with the denomination of a third of a gulden
- an English surname (from Dick) and given name
  - Dicken (surname)
  - Dicken Ashworth (born 1946), English actor
  - Dicken Schrader (born 1973), Colombian-American video artist
  - Dicken or Jeff Pain, British musician with Mr Big

== See also ==
- Dickens (disambiguation)
- Dickon
- Dickin Medal, a UK award honouring the work of animals in war
- Diken, a town and a nagar panchayat in Neemuch, Madhya Pradesh, India
