= T. E. Utley =

British journalist and writer

T.E. Utley

Thomas Edwin Utley CBE (1 February 1921 – 21 June 1988), known as Peter Utley, was a British Tory journalist and writer.

== Early life ==
Utley was adopted by Ann Utley and christened Thomas Edwin, although he was always known as Peter. Ann Utley had been born in Liverpool in 1885, the eldest daughter of Thomas Utley, an engineer, head of a Liverpool engineering company, and the future T. E. Utley appears in the 2021 United Kingdom census for West Derby as Thomas Edwin Cooper, a nephew of the head of the family.

At the age of nine, Utley was struck with blindness as a result of juvenile glaucoma. He developed a meticulous memory, after being forced to rely on having books read aloud to him, and learnt how to dictate logical arguments in clear prose. Educated privately as a child, in October 1939 Utley was living with his adoptive mother and her younger sister Ruth, a schoolmistress, at Windermere in Westmorland, and was recorded for the National Registration Act 1939 as "Student (Blind)". Ann Utley died in September 1940. Utley was by then reading History under Kenneth Pickthorn and Charles Smyth at Corpus Christi College, Cambridge, and went on to graduate BA, gaining a First with distinction.

In June 1938, a letter from Utley was published in The Yorkshire Post in which he warned against entrusting "the conduct of our foreign policy to a clique of imperialists." On 3 September 1938 came a letter in the Hull Daily Mail advising the British government to "leave no doubt whatsoever that we are prepared to join France and Russia in defending Czechoslovakian integrity."

== Journalism ==
Leaving Cambridge during the Second World War, Utley initially joined the staff of the Royal Institute of International Affairs at Chatham House, then went into journalism, and by 1944 was a leader writer for The Times. He composed its leader in response to the 20 July plot to kill Hitler and welcomed it as evidence of anti-totalitarian forces in Germany which might help end the war if encouraged. However, he rewrote the article after the Foreign Office objected to any hint of willingness to negotiate with a post-Nazi German government. Utley's revised leader omitted any mention of support for German resistance to Hitler.

After the war, he also became leader-writer for The Observer and The Sunday Times. His greatest influence over the next decade, however, lay in his role as the in-house philosopher of the Conservative Party, producing pamphlets and delivering lectures on Toryism. In The Conservatives and the Critics (1956) and Not Guilty: The Conservative Reply (1957), Utley defended Butskellism as a genuine Burkean alternative to "both Socialist doctrinaires and middle-class militants". In 1964 he supported R. A. Butler for the Conservative leadership.

In 1964 he became lead writer for The Daily Telegraph and, together with the deputy editor Colin Welch, he recruited young Conservative journalists to the paper. He later became, according to The Times, the "spiritual father of the "Young Fogeys"". In his 1968 study of Enoch Powell's political philosophy, he interpreted Powellism as an attempt to convert the Conservative Party to radical economic liberalism that would replace its paternalistic statism. Utley supported Edward Heath's moves in this direction but he was dismayed when Heath, as Prime Minister, moved back towards corporatism.

After the beginning of The Troubles in Northern Ireland during the late 1960s, Utley began to focus on Northern Ireland. In the general election of February 1974, Utley stood unsuccessfully as the Ulster Unionist Party candidate for North Antrim, gaining 21.01% of the vote but losing to Ian Paisley of the Democratic Unionist Party. His 1975 work, Lessons of Ulster, was described by The Times as "less a study of Irish politics than a brilliant dissection of the inadequacies of liberal statecraft faced with the intransigent passions of nationalism". The editor of The Irish Times called Utley "the ghost of the Morning Post rattling his chains in the corridors of The Daily Telegraph".

Utley was an early supporter of Margaret Thatcher and under her leadership he became a consultant to Conservative Central Office. He was also one of her speech writers and had an input in her Sermon on the Mound. Utley argued that Thatcherism, rather than being a radical deviation from traditional conservatism, was a necessary application of Conservative principles to the problems of an over-powerful state and trade union militancy.

In 1980 Utley was appointed deputy editor at the Daily Telegraph and in 1985 he began a weekly political column for the paper. In 1987 he moved back to The Times, working as the Obituary Editor and as a columnist. This latter move was occasioned by a falling-out with Max Hastings, the then editor of The Telegraph, who disagreed with Utley's views on matters relating to Northern Ireland.

He was appointed a Commander of the Order of the British Empire (CBE) in the 1980 Birthday Honours.

== Personal life ==
In 1951 Utley married Brigid Viola Mary (1927–2012), daughter of Dermot Morrah, a Times journalist, Fellow of All Souls College, Oxford, and later Arundel Herald Extraordinary at the College of Arms. Utley and his wife had two sons and two daughters. One son, Tom, is a columnist for the Daily Mail.

A chain smoker and heavy drinker, Utley's financial situation was often precarious. He died in London on 21 June 1988.

== Assessment ==
After Utley's death, The Times acclaimed him as "the most distinguished Conservative journalist of his generation. He was an important influence on the thinking of the Tory Party, an intellectual precursor of Thatcherism, and throughout his life a mentor – revered, consulted and endlessly quoted – to the young". Margaret Thatcher also paid tribute to Utley:

Few people have possessed such a complete understanding of the central tenets and principles of Toryism as Peter Utley. Certainly no one has articulated them with more eloquence. He stood in the tradition of the great Tory philosophers—Hooker, Burke and Lord Salisbury. Drawing on that tradition, he delivered powerful and incisive judgments on leading political, social and moral issues over a period of more than forty years. Though his range was remarkable, questions affecting the Anglican Church and the unity of the nation always had pride of place in his work. He was, quite simply, the most distinguished Tory thinker of our time.

== Works ==
- Essays in Conservatism (1949).
- Modern Political Thought (1952).
- The Conservatives and the Critics (1956).
- Documents of Modern Political Thought (Joint editor, 1957).
- Not Guilty: The Conservative Reply (1957).
- Edmund Burke (1957).
- Occasion for Ombudsmen (1963).
- Your Money and Your Life (1964).
- Enoch Powell: The Man and his Thinking (1968).
- What Laws May Cure (1968).
- Ulster - A Short Background Analysis (1972).
- Lessons of Ulster (first edition: 1975, second edition: 1997).
- Charles Moore and Simon Heffer (editors), A Tory Seer: The Selected Journalism of T. E. Utley (1989).
