= Tom Utley =

British journalist (born 1953)

Thomas Dermot Utley (born 29 November 1953) is a British journalist who writes for the Daily Mail.

== Life and career ==
Utley is the son of the journalist T. E. Utley and Brigid Viola Mary (1927–2012), daughter of Dermot Morrah, a journalist, Fellow of All Souls College, Oxford, and Arundel Herald Extraordinary at the College of Arms. He was educated at Westminster School and, like his father, read history at Corpus Christi College, Cambridge.

Utley wrote for The Daily Telegraph, where he was described by The Independent as a "star Telegraph columnist" but left in early 2006 after being offered a salary of £120,000 by the Daily Mail.

== Personal life ==
Utley is a Roman Catholic.
