= Philipp Müller (politician) =

Swiss politician (born 1952)

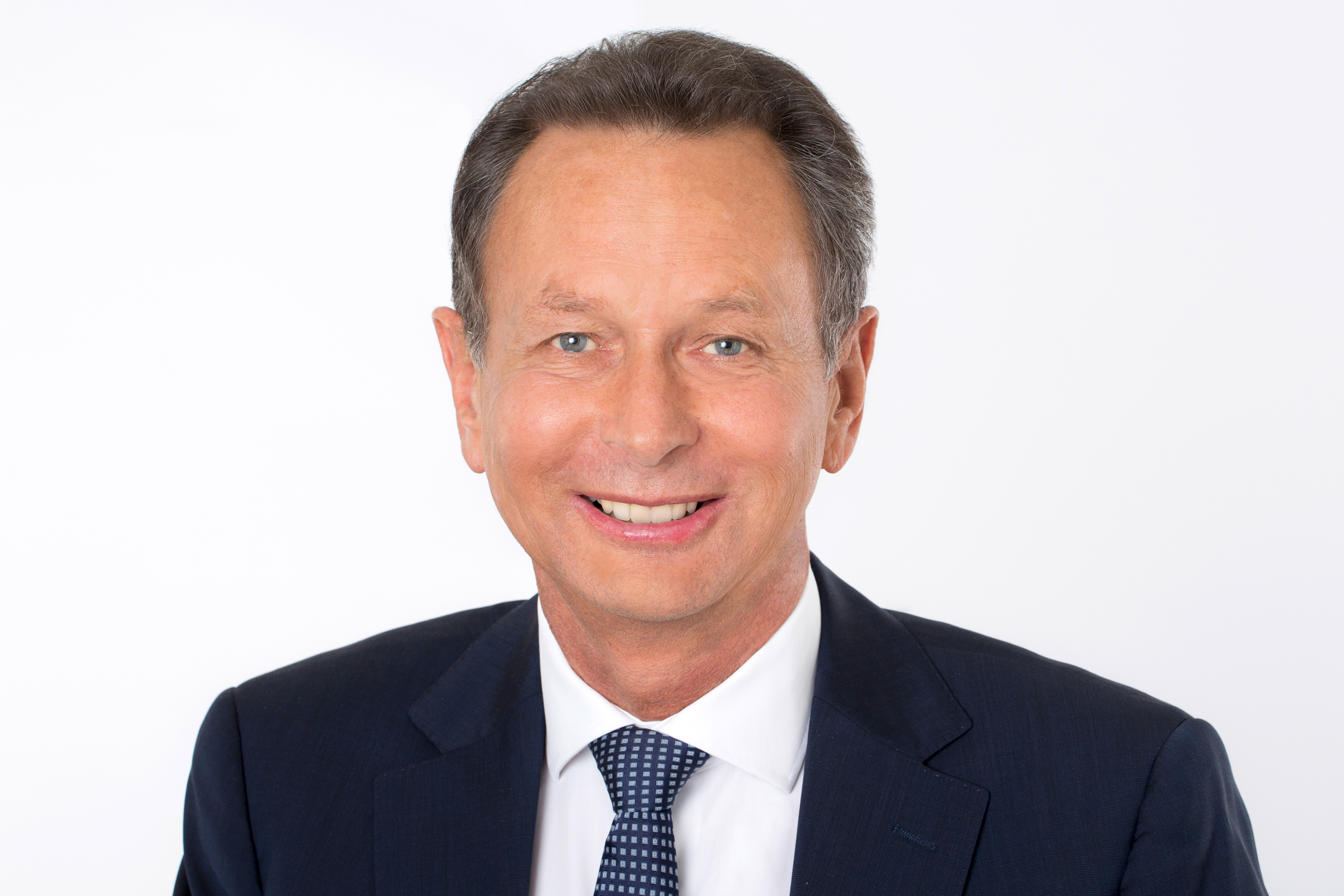
- Official portrait, 2015

Member of Council of States (Switzerland)
- In office 30 November 2015 – 1 December 2019
- Constituency: Canton of Aargau

President of Free Democratic Party
- In office 2012 – 2016
- Preceded by: Fulvio Pelli
- Succeeded by: Petra Gössi

Personal details
- Born: Philipp Müller; 5 November 1952 (age 73) Mogelsberg, Switzerland (now Neckertal)
- Party: Free Democratic Party (before 2009 merger with LP); FDP.The Liberals (2009-present)
- Children: 3
- Occupation: Businessman, politician

Philipp Müller (born 5 November 1952) is a Swiss businessman and former politician who most notably served on the Council of States (Switzerland) from 2016 to 2019. He concurrently served as President of the Free Democratic Party of Switzerland from 2012 to 2016.

== Early life and education ==
Müller was born 5 November 1952 in Mogelsberg, Switzerland (presently part of Neckertal), an only child, into a family of modest means. His father was a plasterer by trade. After ultimately becoming a plasterer himself he took over the family business and contineously turned it into a general contracting business.
