= Oberhelfenschwil =

- Former municipality
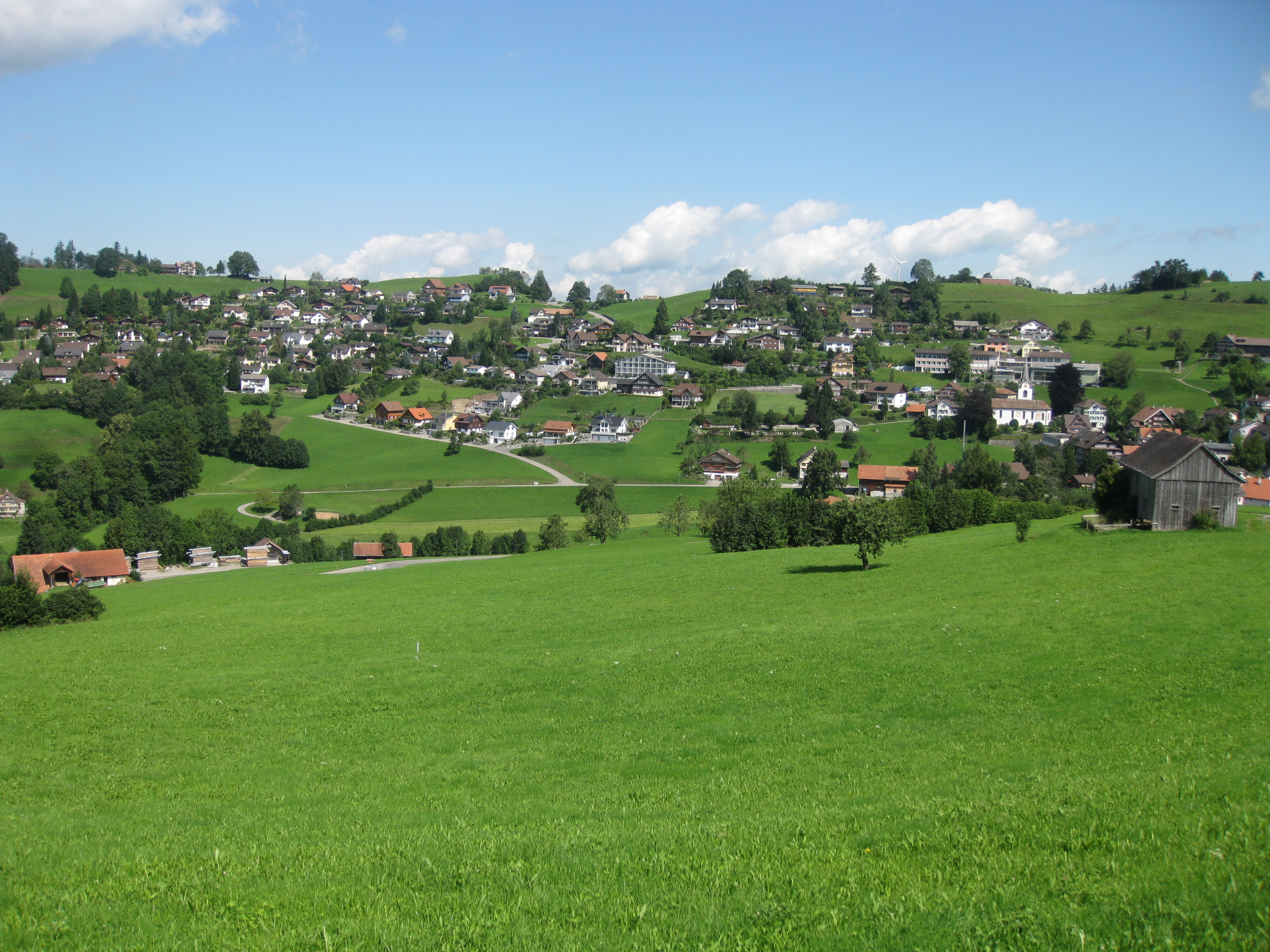

- Coat of arms
- Location of Oberhelfenschwil
- Location within Switzerland Location within Canton of St. Gallen
- Coordinates: 47°21′N 9°6′E
- Country: Switzerland
- Canton: St. Gallen
- District: Toggenburg

Government
  - Mayor: Toni Hässig

Area
  - Total: 12.68 km^{2} (4.90 sq mi)
- Elevation: 805 m (2,641 ft)

Population (December 2020)
  - Total: 1,241
  - Density: 97.87/km^{2} (253.5/sq mi)
- Time zone: UTC+01:00 (CET)
  - Summer (DST): UTC+02:00 (CEST)
- Postal code: 9621
- SFOS number: 3375
- ISO 3166 code: CH-SG
- Surrounded by: Brunnadern, Bütschwil, Ganterschwil, Lichtensteig, Mogelsberg, Wattwil
- Website: www.oberhelfenschwil.ch

Oberhelfenschwil is a former municipality in the Wahlkreis (constituency) of Toggenburg in the canton of St. Gallen in Switzerland. On 1 January 2023 the former municipalities of Hemberg and Oberhelfenschwil merged into the new municipality of Neckertal.

== History ==
Oberhelfenschwil is first mentioned in 882 as Helfoltiswilare. In 1515 it was mentioned as Oberhelfenschwil.

== Geography ==
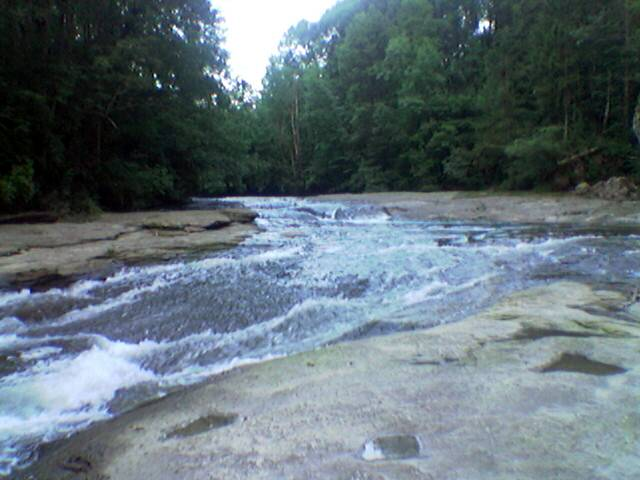
Necker river at Oberhelfenschwil

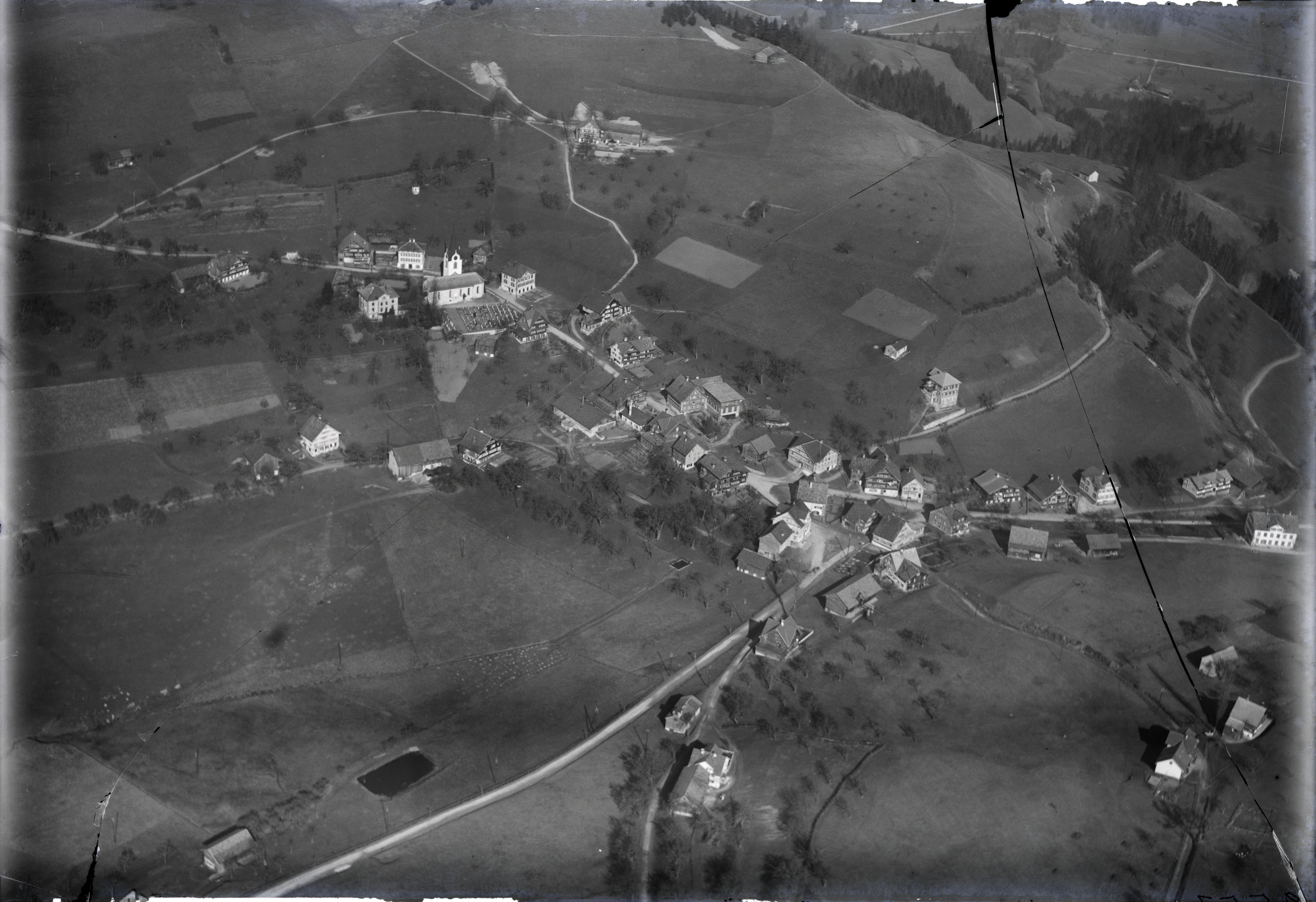
Aerial view from 300 m by Walter Mittelholzer (1920)

Oberhelfenschwil has an area, as of 2006, of 12.7 km^{2} (4.9 sq mi). Of this area, 61.7% is used for agricultural purposes, while 33.6% is forested. Of the rest of the land, 4.2% is settled (buildings or roads) and the remainder (0.5%) is non-productive (rivers or lakes).

The municipality is located in the Toggenburg Wahlkreis between the Thur and Necker valleys. It consists of the village of Oberhelfenschwil and the hamlets of Wigetshof, Oberwil, Metzwil, Wasserfluh, Rennen, Winzlisau, Utenwil, Schwanden and Füberg.

== Coat of arms ==
The blazon of the municipal coat of arms is Per pale Or a Tower Sable and Barry of Six Argent and Sable.

== Demographics ==
Oberhelfenschwil has a population (as of 31 December 2020) of 1,241. As of 2007, about 8.1% of the population was made up of foreign nationals. Of the foreign population, (as of 2000), 14 are from Germany, 7 are from Italy, 84 are from ex-Yugoslavia, 3 are from Austria, 19 are from Turkey, and 69 are from another country. Over the last 10 years the population has decreased at a rate of -1.7%. Most of the population (as of 2000) speaks German (91.6%), with Albanian being second most common ( 1.9%) and Serbo-Croatian being third ( 1.4%). Of the Swiss national languages (as of 2000), 1,334 speak German, 9 people speak French, 6 people speak Italian, and 2 people speak Romansh.

The age distribution, as of 2000, in Oberhelfenschwil is; 253 children or 17.4% of the population are between 0 and 9 years old and 239 teenagers or 16.4% are between 10 and 19. Of the adult population, 136 people or 9.3% of the population are between 20 and 29 years old. 219 people or 15.0% are between 30 and 39, 211 people or 14.5% are between 40 and 49, and 123 people or 8.4% are between 50 and 59. The senior population distribution is 105 people or 7.2% of the population are between 60 and 69 years old, 100 people or 6.9% are between 70 and 79, there are 59 people or 4.1% who are between 80 and 89, and there are 11 people or 0.8% who are between 90 and 99.

In 2000 there were 100 persons (or 6.9% of the population) who were living alone in a private dwelling. There were 282 (or 19.4%) persons who were part of a couple (married or otherwise committed) without children, and 837 (or 57.5%) who were part of a couple with children. There were 78 (or 5.4%) people who lived in single parent home, while there are 12 persons who were adult children living with one or both parents, 4 persons who lived in a household made up of relatives, 12 who lived household made up of unrelated persons, and 131 who are either institutionalized or live in another type of collective housing.

In the 2007 federal election the most popular party was the SVP which received 29.1% of the vote. The next three most popular parties were the CVP (28.6%), the FDP (15.7%) and the SP (11%).

In Oberhelfenschwil about 62.5% of the population (between age 25-64) have completed either non-mandatory upper secondary education or additional higher education (either university or a Fachhochschule). Out of the total population in Oberhelfenschwil, as of 2000, the highest education level completed by 321 people (22.0% of the population) was Primary, while 415 (28.5%) have completed their secondary education, 120 (8.2%) have attended a Tertiary school, and 68 (4.7%) are not in school. The remainder did not answer this question.

The historical population is given in the following table:

year	population
1827	1,196
1850	1,872
1900	1,079
1950	982
2000	1,456

== Economy ==
As of 2007, Oberhelfenschwil had an unemployment rate of 0.83%. As of 2005, there were 114 people employed in the primary economic sector and about 56 businesses involved in this sector. 148 people are employed in the secondary sector and there are 19 businesses in this sector. 147 people are employed in the tertiary sector, with 27 businesses in this sector.

As of October 2009 the average unemployment rate was 1.3%. There were 98 businesses in the municipality of which 21 were involved in the secondary sector of the economy while 28 were involved in the third.

As of 2000 there were 278 residents who worked in the municipality, while 342 residents worked outside Oberhelfenschwil and 185 people commuted into the municipality for work.

== Religion ==
From the 2000 census, 569 or 39.1% are Roman Catholic, while 566 or 38.9% belonged to the Swiss Reformed Church. Of the rest of the population, there is 1 individual who belongs to the Christian Catholic faith, there are 27 individuals (or about 1.85% of the population) who belong to the Orthodox Church, and there are 41 individuals (or about 2.82% of the population) who belong to another Christian church. There are 100 (or about 6.87% of the population) who are Islamic. There are 5 individuals (or about 0.34% of the population) who belong to another church (not listed on the census), 91 (or about 6.25% of the population) belong to no church, are agnostic or atheist, and 56 individuals (or about 3.85% of the population) did not answer the question.
