= Hemberg, St. Gallen =

Hemberg
- Former municipality
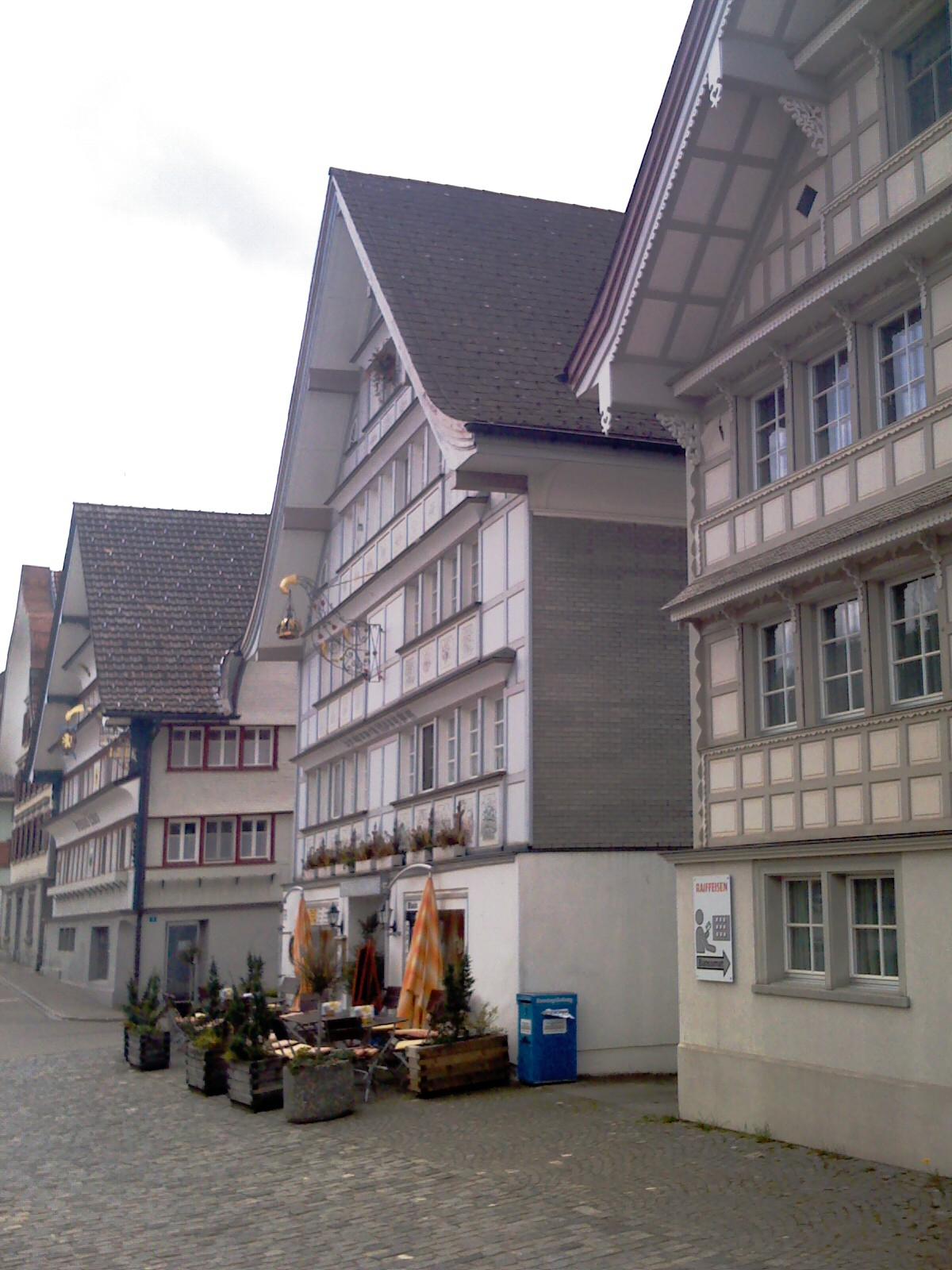
- Hemberg village center

- Coat of arms
- Location of Hemberg
- Location within Switzerland Location within Canton of St. Gallen
- Coordinates: 47°18′N 9°10′E
- Country: Switzerland
- Canton: St. Gallen
- District: Toggenburg

Government
  - Mayor: Walter Fischbacher

Area
  - Total: 20.15 km^{2} (7.78 sq mi)
- Elevation: 935 m (3,068 ft)

Population (December 2020)
  - Total: 909
  - Density: 45.1/km^{2} (117/sq mi)
- Time zone: UTC+01:00 (CET)
  - Summer (DST): UTC+02:00 (CEST)
- Postal code: 9633
- SFOS number: 3372
- ISO 3166 code: CH-SG
- Surrounded by: Brunnadern, Ebnat-Kappel, Mogelsberg, Nesslau-Krummenau, Sankt Peterzell, Schönengrund (AR), Urnäsch (AR), Wattwil
- Website: www.hemberg.ch

Hemberg is a former municipality in the Wahlkreis (constituency) of Toggenburg in the canton of St. Gallen in Switzerland. On 1 January 2023 the former municipalities of Hemberg and Oberhelfenschwil merged into the new municipality of Neckertal.

== History ==
Hemberg is first mentioned in 878 as Hemmenberch. In 1225, it was mentioned as Hemberc.

== Geography ==
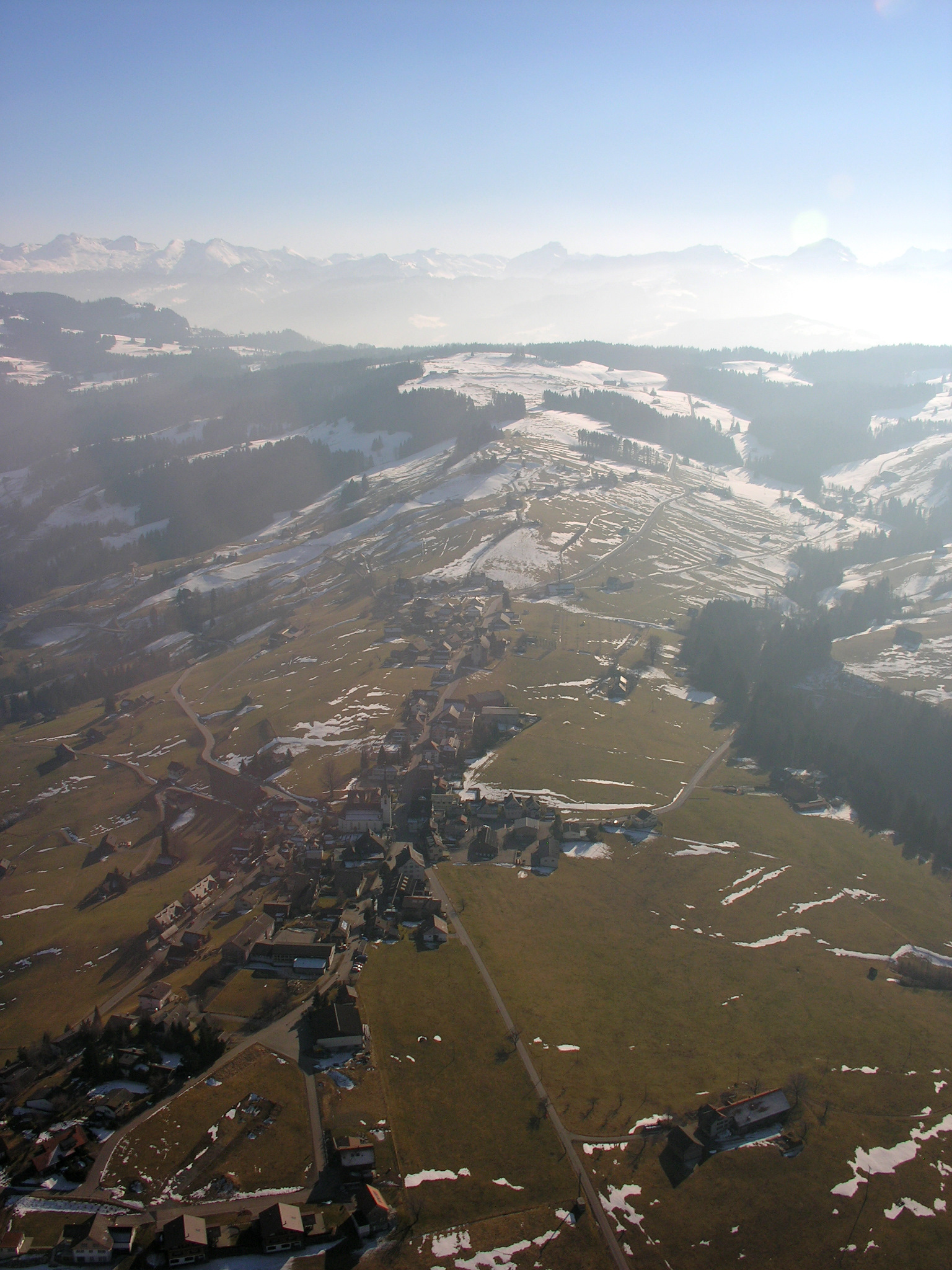
Aerial view of Hemberg

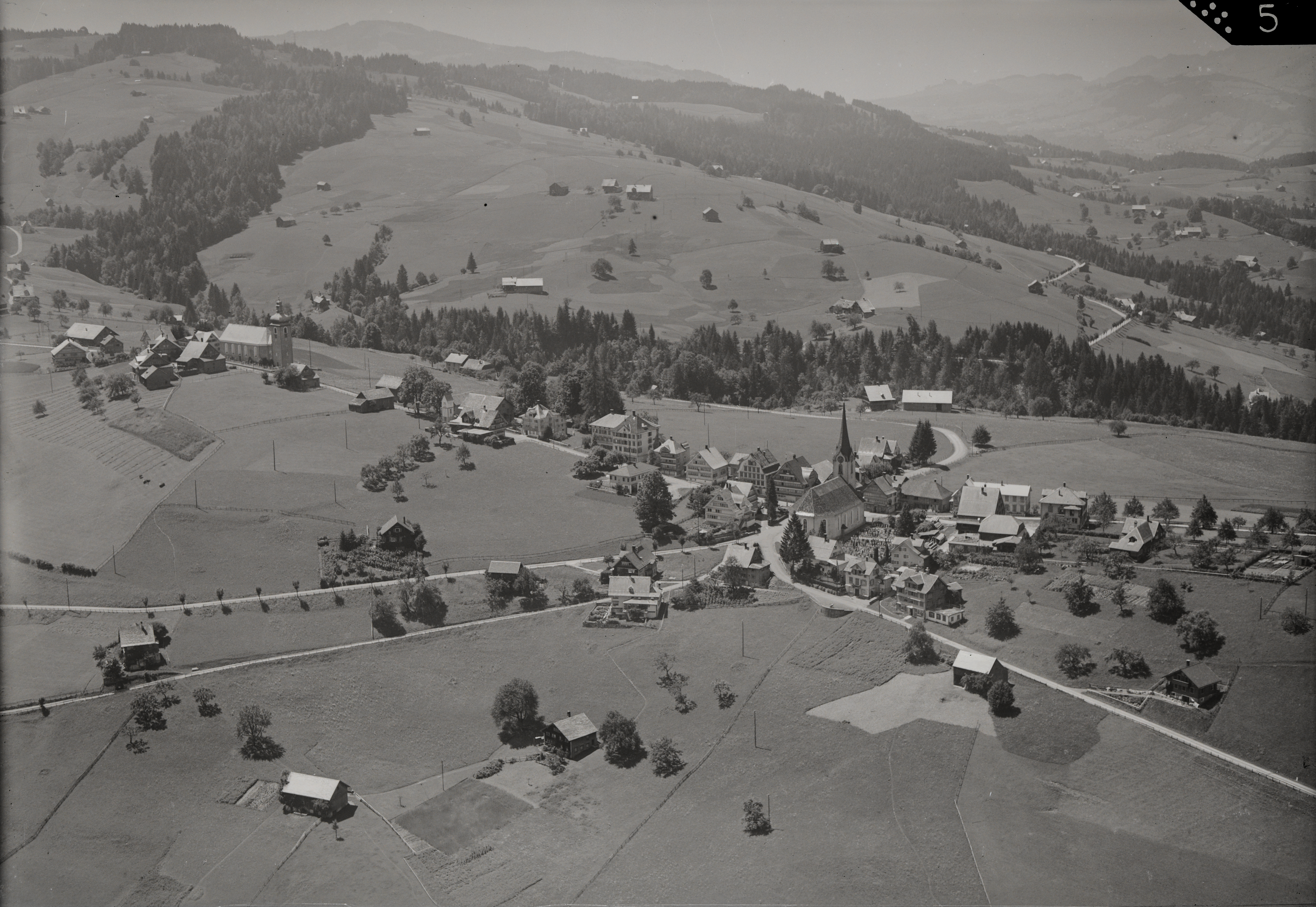
Aerial view (1947)

Hemberg has an area, as of 2006, of 20.2 km^{2} (7.8 sq mi). Of this area, 63.9% is used for agricultural purposes, while 31.9% is forested. Of the rest of the land, 3.7% is settled (buildings or roads) and the remainder (0.6%) is non-productive (rivers or lakes).

The municipality is located in the Toggenburg Wahlkreis in the alpine foothills around the upper Necker river. It is located in a line of hills at an elevation of 945 m (3,100 ft) and west of the Neckar river. It consists of the village of Hemberg and the hamlets of Bächli, Mistelegg, Bomen, Harzenmoos, Brand, Lemberg, Starkenbach, Wis and Unterhemberg.

== Coat of arms ==
The blazon of the municipal coat of arms is Per fess dancety Argent and Vert.

== Demographics ==
Hemberg has a population (as of 31 December 2020) of 909. As of 2007, about 5.6% of the population was made up of foreign nationals. Of the foreign population, (as of 2000), 14 are from Germany, 1 person is from Italy, 5 are from ex-Yugoslavia, 3 are from Austria, and 7 are from another country. Over the last 10 years the population has decreased at a rate of -1.1%. Most of the population (as of 2000) speaks German (98.7%), with English being second most common ( 0.5%) and Serbo-Croatian being third ( 0.3%). Of the Swiss national languages (as of 2000), 932 speak German, 1 person speaks, Italian,

The age distribution, as of 2000, in Hemberg is; 146 children or 15.5% of the population are between 0 and 9 years old and 187 teenagers or 19.8% are between 10 and 19. Of the adult population, 90 people or 9.5% of the population are between 20 and 29 years old. 111 people or 11.8% are between 30 and 39, 136 people or 14.4% are between 40 and 49, and 95 people or 10.1% are between 50 and 59. The senior population distribution is 70 people or 7.4% of the population are between 60 and 69 years old, 77 people or 8.2% are between 70 and 79, there are 26 people or 2.8% who are between 80 and 89, and there are 6 people or 0.6% who are between 90 and 99.

In 2000 there were 85 persons (or 9.0% of the population) who were living alone in a private dwelling. There were 156 (or 16.5%) persons who were part of a couple (married or otherwise committed) without children, and 553 (or 58.6%) who were part of a couple with children. There were 47 (or 5.0%) people who lived in single parent home, while there are 9 persons who were adult children living with one or both parents, 3 persons who lived in a household made up of relatives, and 91 who are either institutionalized or live in another type of collective housing.

In the 2007 federal election the most popular party was the SVP which received 43.8% of the vote. The next three most popular parties were the FDP (15.8%), the CVP (15.6%) and the SP (7.9%).

The entire Swiss population is generally well educated. In Hemberg about 66.8% of the population (between age 25–64) have completed either non-mandatory upper secondary education or additional higher education (either university or a Fachhochschule). Out of the total population in Hemberg, as of 2000, the highest education level completed by 232 people (24.6% of the population) was Primary, while 283 (30.0%) have completed Secondary, 65 (6.9%) have attended a Tertiary school, and 44 (4.7%) are not in school. The remainder did not answer this question.

The historical population is given in the following table:

| year | population |
|---|---|
| 1827 | 1,882 |
| 1850 | 1,813 |
| 1900 | 1,348 |
| 1950 | 1,003 |
| 2000 | 944 |

== Religion ==
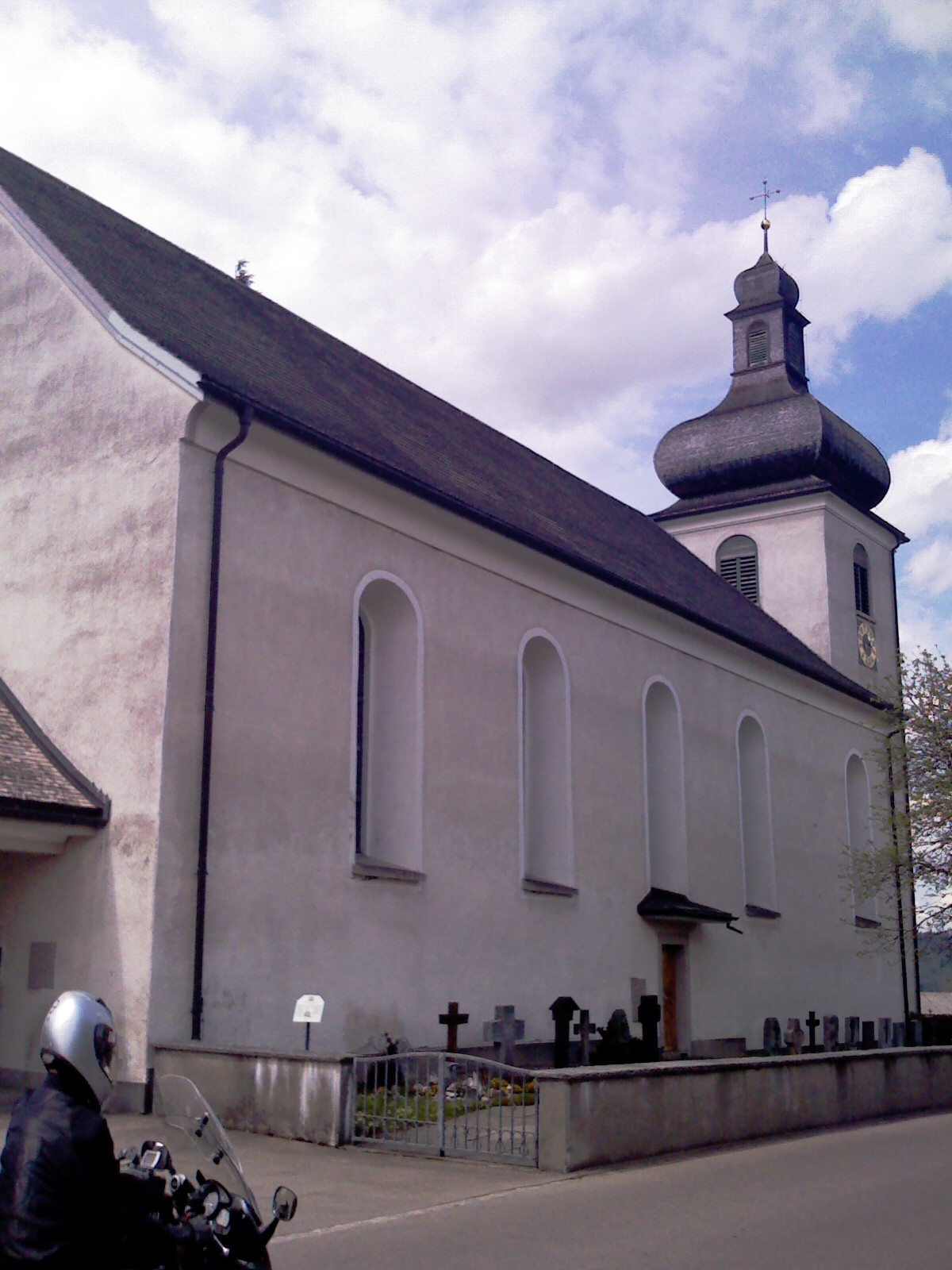
Catholic church of Hemberg

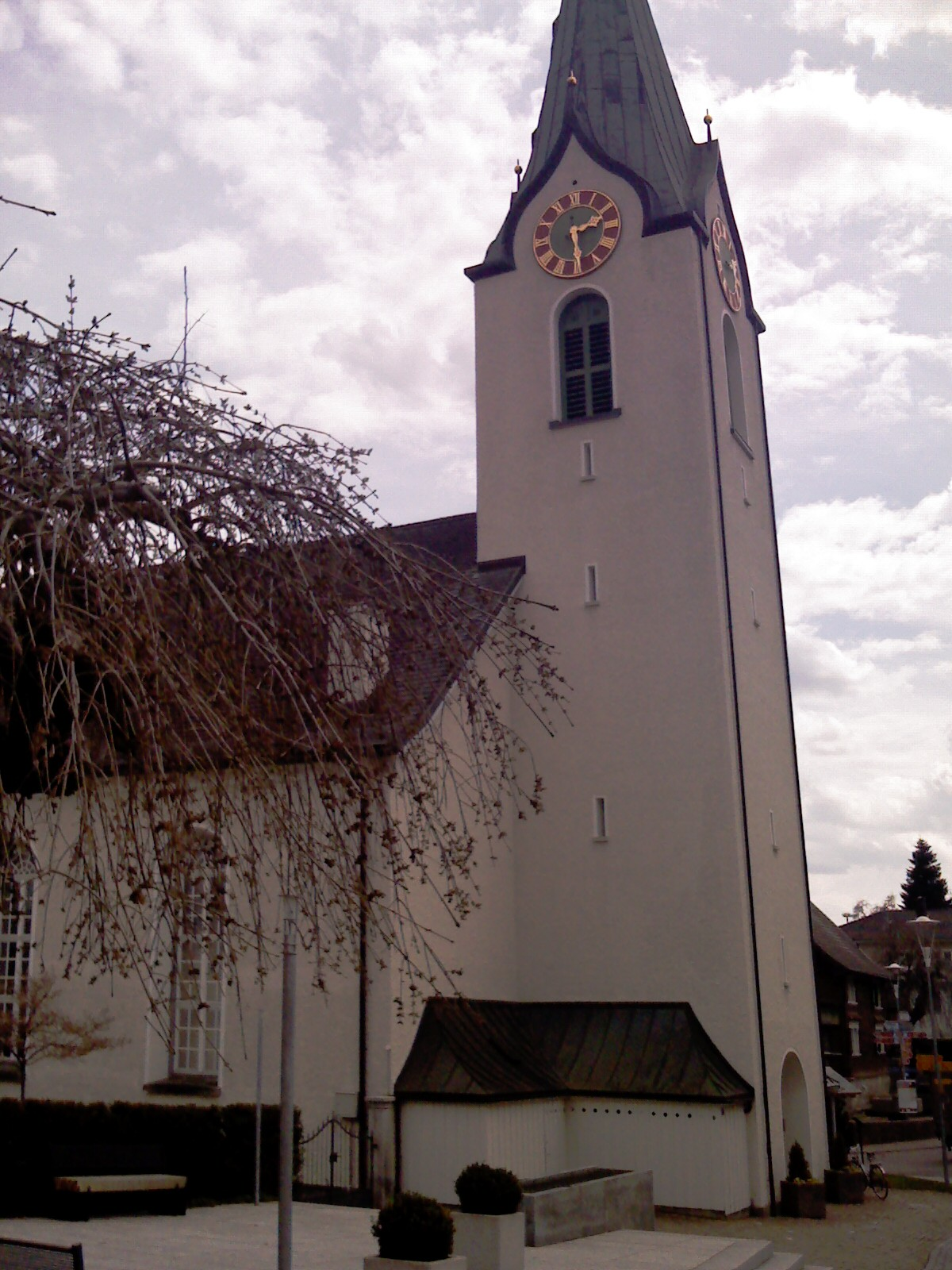
Swiss Reformed Church of Hemberg

From the 2000 census, 156 or 16.5% are Roman Catholic, while 683 or 72.4% belonged to the Swiss Reformed Church. Of the rest of the population, there are 7 individuals (or about 0.74% of the population) who belong to the Orthodox Church, and there are 23 individuals (or about 2.44% of the population) who belong to another Christian church. There are 4 individuals (or about 0.42% of the population) who belong to another church (not listed on the census), 52 (or about 5.51% of the population) belong to no church, are agnostic or atheist, and 19 individuals (or about 2.01% of the population) did not answer the question.

== Heritage sites of national significance ==
The Rotes Haus (Red House) in Bächli on Brugg 693 is listed as a Swiss heritage site of national significance.

== Economy ==
As of 2007, Hemberg had an unemployment rate of 0.63%. As of 2005, there were 165 people employed in the primary economic sector and about 72 businesses involved in this sector. 47 people are employed in the secondary sector and there are 12 businesses in this sector. 178 people are employed in the tertiary sector, with 32 businesses in this sector.

As of October 2009 the average unemployment rate was 1.6%. There were 115 businesses in the municipality of which 11 were involved in the secondary sector of the economy while 36 were involved in the third.

As of 2000 there were 246 residents who worked in the municipality, while 191 residents worked outside Hemberg and 54 people commuted into the municipality for work.
