= Petra Gössi =

Swiss politician

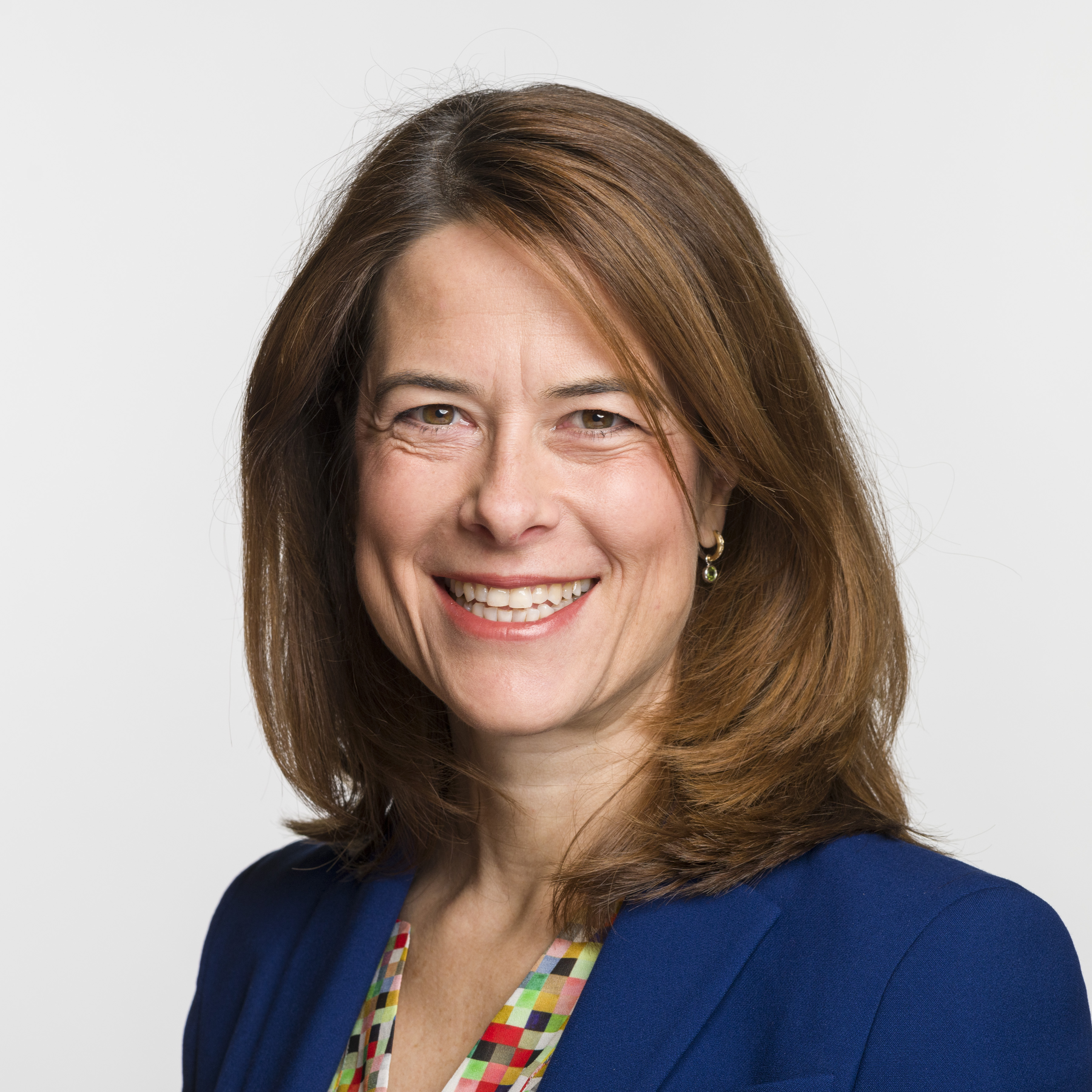

Member of the National Council (Switzerland)
- In office 5 December 2011 – 3 December 2023
- Preceded by: Philipp Müller
- Constituency: Schwyz

President of FDP.The Liberals
- In office 16 April 2016 – October 2021

Personal details
- Born: 12 January 1976 (age 50) Lucerne, Lucerne, Switzerland
- Party: The Liberals
- Domestic partner: Joe Hättenschwiler (since 2019)
- Education: Gymnasium Immensee
- Alma mater: University of Bern (Licentiate); Lucerne University of Applied Sciences and Arts (Master); University of St. Gallen
- Occupation: Politician / Business Consultant
- Website: petragoessi.ch (in German)

Petra Christina Antonella Gössi (born 12 January 1976 in Lucerne) is a Swiss politician. She was a member of the National Council from 2011 to 2023 for The Liberals and was elected to the Council of States in 2023. Previously she served on the Cantonal Council of Schwyz between 2004 and 2011. Since 2006, she has been a member of the management of The Liberals and between 2012 and 2016 was president of her political party.

== Early life and education ==
Gössi was born 12 January 1976 in Lucerne, Switzerland to Anton 'Tony' and Edy (née Pini) Gössi. Her parents operated a household supply store. Her mother hailed from Ticino, therefore she was raised bilingual.

She was raised in Küssnacht am Rigi on Lake Lucerne. She attended Gymnasium Immensee, where she completed her Matura. Subsequently she studied Law at the University of Bern graduating with a Licentiate degree. She completed a Master's degree in Economic Crime Investigation at Lucerne University of Applied Sciences and Arts. Since March 2021, she is enrolled at the University of St. Gallen for a Diploma in General Management.

== Career ==
Gössi completed various internships and trainee programs, most prominently with Arthur Andersen in 2002, but also with local courts and law offices in Schwyz, Zug and Zürich. She held various positions until 2008, before she became a tax and business consultant for Bayron AG in Zürich.

== Politics ==
In 2004, she was elected to the Cantonal Council of Schwyz. At the age of 32, she became the council president and served in that role until 2011, when she was elected to the National Council. She was also selected as the FDP leader in Schwyz.

In 2016, Gössi succeeded Philipp Müller as the leader of the national FDP. She is the second woman to lead the party. She resigned from this position in 2021.

In 2023, she was elected to the Council of States.

== Personal life ==
Gössi is in a relationship with Josef Alois 'Joe' Hättenschwiler, a Zürich-based psychiatrist. She resides in Küssnacht am Rigi.
