= Dicken (surname) =

Dicken is an English surname, derived from a diminutive of the medieval given name Richard via the pet form Dick. Notable people with the surname include:

- Billy Dicken (born 1974), American gridiron football player and coach
- Charles Gauntlett Dicken (1854–1937), Royal Navy admiral
- Darrell Dicken (born 1977), American poker player
- Paul Dicken (born 1943), American baseball player
- Peter Dicken (born 1938), English economic geographer
- Roger Dicken (1939–2024), British special effects artist

== See also ==
- Dicken (disambiguation)
- Dickens (surname)
- Dickin
- Dickon
