= St. Peterzell =

- Former municipality
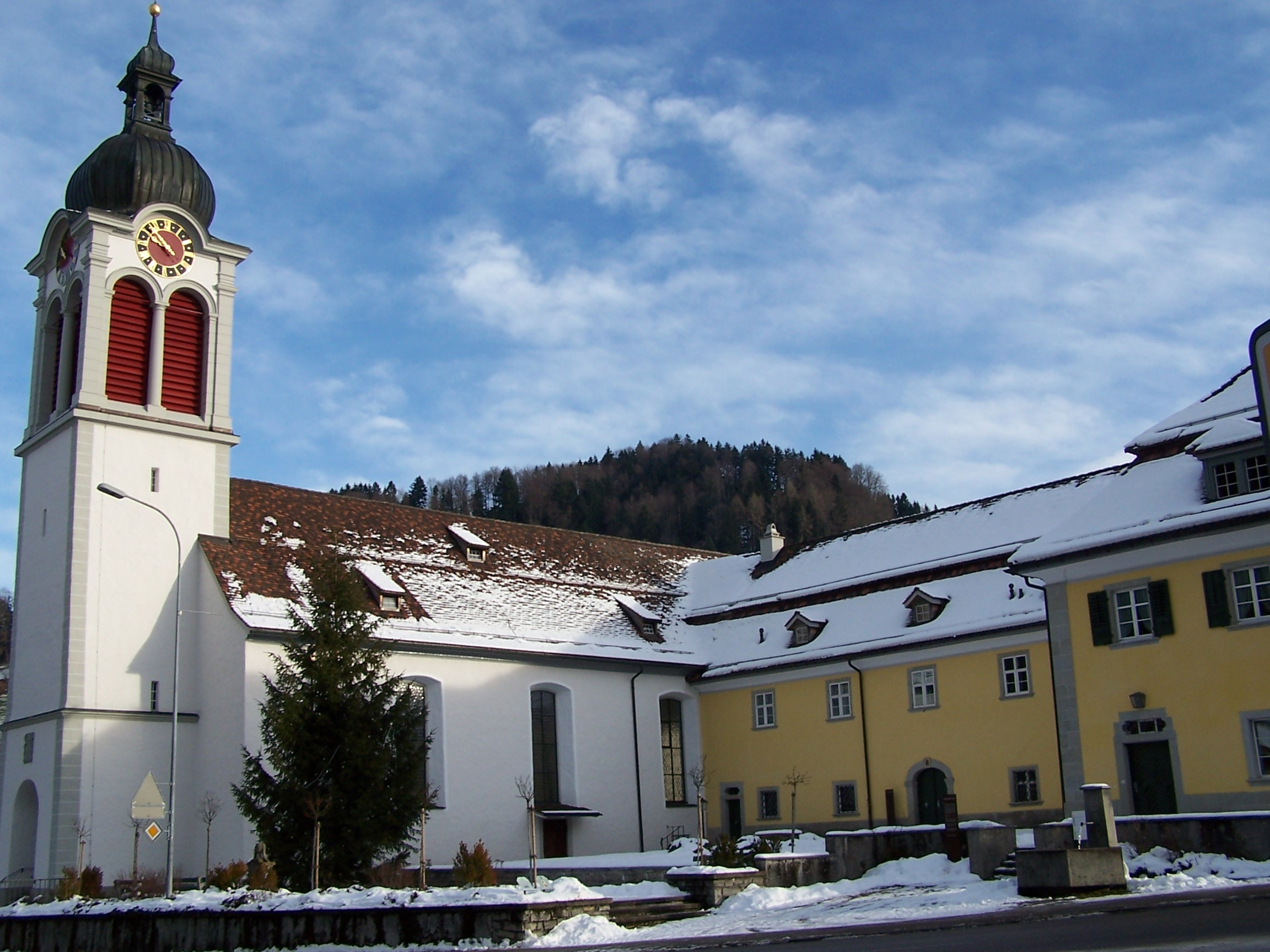

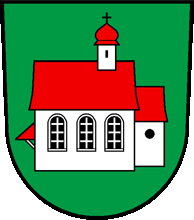
- Coat of arms
- Location of St. Peterzell
- Location within Switzerland Location within Canton of St. Gallen
- Coordinates: 47°19′N 9°10′E
- Country: Switzerland
- Canton: St. Gallen
- District: Toggenburg

Area
  - Total: 9.38 km^{2} (3.62 sq mi)
- Elevation: 710 m (2,330 ft)

Population (January 2004)
  - Total: 1,203
  - Density: 128/km^{2} (332/sq mi)
- Time zone: UTC+01:00 (CET)
  - Summer (DST): UTC+02:00 (CEST)
- Postal code: 9127
- SFOS number: 3376
- ISO 3166 code: CH-SG
- Surrounded by: Degersheim, Hemberg, Mogelsberg, Schönengrund (AR), Schwellbrunn (AR)
- Website: www.stpeterzell.ch

St. Peterzell is a municipality in the Wahlkreis (constituency) of Toggenburg in the canton of St. Gallen in Switzerland. It was an independent municipality until January 1, 2009, when it merged with Brunnadern and Mogelsberg to form the municipality of Neckertal.

Aerial view (1957)

== History ==
The Christian Fischbacher Company in St. Gallen was originally founded in St. Peterzell by its namesake, whom was the son of a farmer before making handwoven cloth in 1819. St. Peterzell Church was constructed in 1964 and belongs to the Swiss Reformed Church's Evangelical Reformed Church of Oberer Necker. By 2022, it was announced that it would need renovations in order to fix a leaking roof and damage to furnishings as well as create it as a community space. The cost of the plan was estimated at 4.7 million Swiss Francs. A civil referendum was held on if the parish would approve funding for the renovation but the voters rejected the proposal by 64%. In 2024, the parish council announced they had included funding for the renovation in the 2024 budget.

Between 2001 and 2022, the mayor of St. Peterzell was Vreni Wild. She oversaw the municipality's transition from an independent parish into a combined one called Neckertal after a merger with Brunnadern and Mogelsberg in 2009, with her regularly discussing the transition requirements with the mayor of Brunnadern, Adolf Fäh. St. Peterzell has a gym and gymnastics club. In 2010, it had a new fire station constructed. Following the merger, St. Peterzell hosts the annual Neckertal agricultural show, emphasising on showcasing brown Swiss cattle.
