= Alan Dickins =

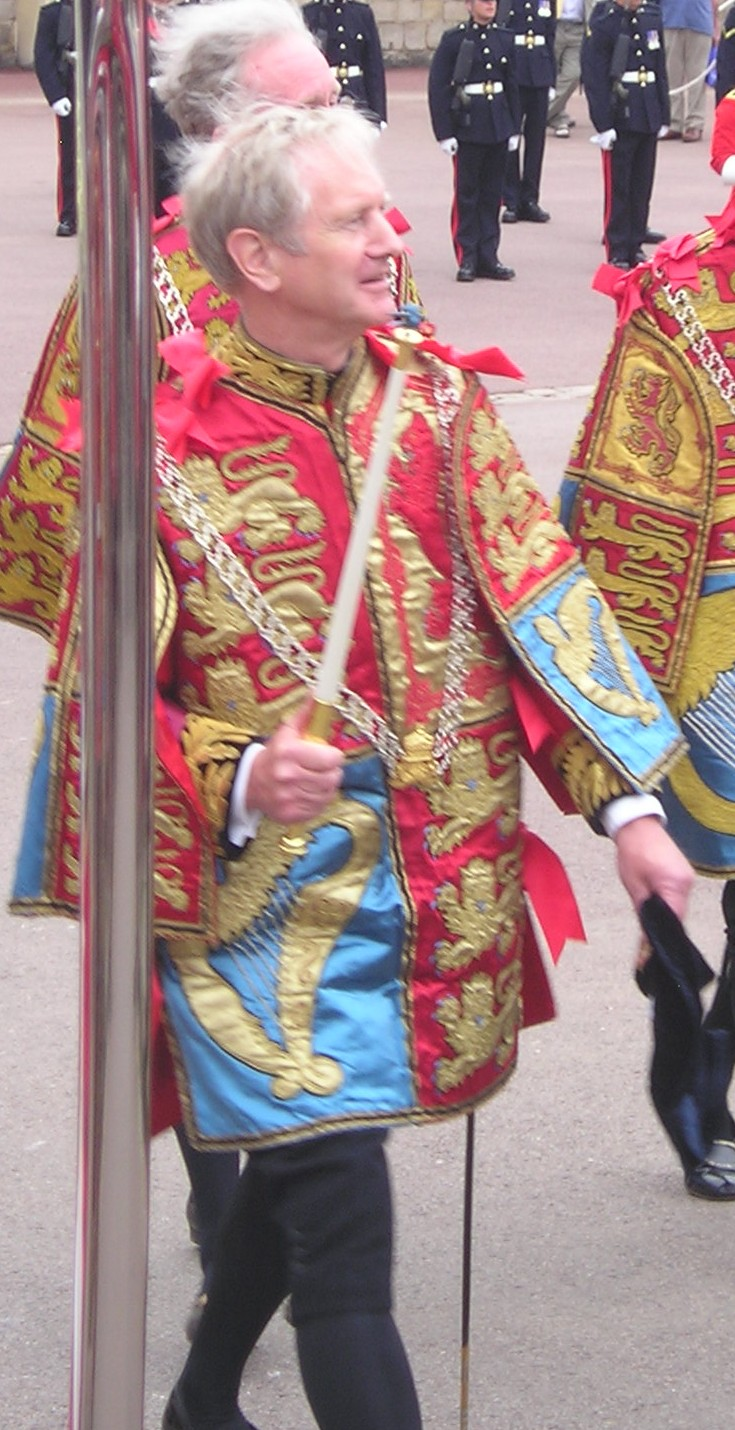

Alan Roger Dickins was Arundel Herald of Arms Extraordinary from 1998 to 2016.

He was educated at Epsom College, Surrey and Emmanuel College, Cambridge, where he graduated with a law degree in 1968. He qualified in 1972 as a solicitor of the Supreme Court of England and Wales, but a keen interest in genealogy and heraldry eventually led to his engagement in 1986 as a research assistant at the College of Arms. From 1995 he worked closely with Garter Principal King of Arms, Peter Gwynn-Jones while at the same time pursuing a fully independent legal career. He has made a special study of the relationship between intellectual property law and the present-day law of arms. He was appointed Arundel Herald of Arms Extraordinary in 1998, succeeding Rodney Dennys (d.1993), and demitted that office in 2016. He was married from 1983 to 2015 and has two sons. His other interests include music and fell-walking.

== Publications ==
- Alan R Dickins (ed.). The Visitation of Hertfordshire 1669. (Harleian Society, London: 2019).

== Arms ==
Coat of arms of Alan Roger Dickins
Granted 17 December 1998 Crest Two goat's heads addorsed conjoined at the neck couped argent armed bearded and collared azure. Escutcheon Per fess azure and argent in base three chevronels embowed and interlaced throughout and in chief three like chevronels reversed all counterchanged. Motto To Thine Own Self Be True Badge A goat's head caboshed argent armed in saltire and bearded azure.
