= William Dickins =

Anglican archdeacon

William Arthur Dickins was Archdeacon of Bombay from 1907 until 1913.

He was born in St Nicholas Vicarage, Emscote, Warwick on 18 April 1861, the son of the Rev. Thomas Bourne Dickins and his wife Sarah Catherine Trow.

Dickins was educated at Lincoln College, Oxford; Durham University; and Lichfield Theological College. He was made Deacon in the Church of England in 1886, and priested by the Bishop of Lichfield in 1888.

After a curacy in Penn, 1886-1891, he was appointed as a Chaplain on the Bombay ecclesiastical establishment in 1891, going on to serve at Ahmedabad, Nasirabad, Aden, Kirkee, Malabar Hill and Ahmednagar, prior to his appointment as Archdeacon.

In 1913 he was appointed Vicar of Otterbourne, and then, in 1918, was appointed Vicar of Over Stowey.

Dickins died in a nursing home in Margate on 21 June 1921.

He was married in Rousham on 31 March 1891 to Constance Mary Nelson. The couple had a son and a daughter.
