= Dickens (disambiguation) =

Charles Dickens (1812–1870) was an English writer and social critic.

Dickens may also refer to:

== People ==
- Dickens (surname)
- Dickens family, descendants of John Dickens, including his son Charles Dickens

== Places ==
- Dickens (crater), a crater on Mercury

United Kingdom

- Dickens Heath, village in the borough of Solihull, West Midlands

United States

- Dickens, Iowa (population 146 at the 2020 census), a city in Clay County
- Dickens, Maryland, an unincorporated community in Allegany County
- Dickens, Missouri, an unincorporated community
- Dickens, Nebraska, an unincorporated community in Lincoln County
- Dickens, Texas (population 219 at the 2020 census), a city in Dickens County
- Dickens County, Texas (population 1,770 at the 2020 census)

== Arts, entertainment, and media ==
- Dickens (TV miniseries), 2002 PBS miniseries
- Dickens in America, 2005 BBC television documentary
- Dickensian (TV series), 2016 BBC drama that brings together characters created by Charles Dickens in a Victorian community

== Education ==
- Charles Dickens Elementary School, public elementary school in Vancouver, Canada
- Dickens Annex, public elementary school in Vancouver, Canada
- Dickens Hall, historical building at Kansas State University in Manhattan, U.S.

== Entertainment venues ==
- Dickens Athletic Center, 2,500-seat multi-purpose arena in Chicago, U.S.
- Dickens World, themed attraction located at Chatham Dockyard, Kent, UK
- Dickens on the Strand, annual Christmas festival in Galveston, Texas, U.S.

== Other uses ==
- USS Dickens, U.S. Navy attack transport during WW2

== See also ==
- Dickins (disambiguation)
