= George Dickins =

English cricketer

Personal information
- Full name: George Caldwell Dickins
- Born: 17 November 1821; North Elmham, Norfolk, England
- Died: 5 December 1903 (aged 82); Coldstream, Berwickshire, Scotland
- Batting: Left-handed
- Bowling: Right-arm lob

Domestic team information
- Years: Team
- 1848–1853: Gentlemen of Kent
- 1849–1864: Kent
- FC debut: 21 June 1848 Gentlemen of Kent v Cambridge University
- Last FC: 19 September 1864 Kent v Yorkshire

Career statistics
Competition	First-class
Matches	7
Runs scored	148
Batting average	14.36
100s/50s	0/0
Top score	44
Catches/stumpings	1/–
- Source: Cricinfo, 17 June 2020

George Caldwell Dickins (17 November 1821 – 5 December 1903) was an English soldier and amateur cricketer. He played in seven first-class cricket matches between 1848 and 1864.

== Early life ==
Dickins was born at North Elmham in Norfolk and was educated at Harrow School. He was the son of Watson and Mary Dickins, his father being a Church of England priest, and the family lived in Kent during at least some of Dickins' early life. (Note: Dickins' place of birth is given as Adisham in his service records and he appears to have been living in the village in 1852. Both his and his brother's Harrow School records show the family as living at Adisham.)

== Army career ==
After leaving Harrow, Dickins was commissioned into the British Army in 1842, initially as an ensign in the 98th (Prince of Wales's) Regiment of Foot. He transferred to the Royal Scots Fusiliers almost immediately and served until 1848 in the East Indies, being promoted to lieutenant in 1846. On returning to Britain in 1848 he served in Scotland, the north of England and in Ireland, transferring to the 46th Regiment of Foot as a captain.

He resigned his commission in 1854 and the following year joined a contingent of British ex-servicemen to fight in the Crimean War with the rank of major. (Note: Dickins joined the unit known as the Anglo-Turkish Contingent or the British Ottoman Contingent, a force of over 20,000 mainly East India Company servicemen led by Robert Vivian.) He left the unit shortly before it was disbanded in 1858.

== Cricket ==
Although he did not play for the school First XI, Dickins was a keen club cricketer. He played some of his cricket whilst serving in Scotland, the north of England and Ireland. He made his first-class debut for the Gentlemen of Kent during 1848 at Canterbury, shortly after returning from service in the East Indies. He played seven first-class matches, five for the Gentlemen of Kent and two for Kent County Cricket Club, both against Yorkshire, one in 1849 and the other in 1864. He played for Kelso, Northumberland and Roxburghshire regularly, and for Scottish teams.

== Family and later life ==
Dickins married Frances Collingwood in 1851 at Durham. Two of their sons are known to have played club cricket in Scotland. The family lived in Northumberland and southern Scotland. Dickins was declared bankrupt in 1865 and Frances died in 1867.

Dickins died in 1903 at Coldstream in the Scottish borders. He was aged 82.

== Bibliography ==
- Carlaw, Derek (2020). Kent County Cricketers, A to Z: Part One (1806–1914) (PDF). Cardiff: ACS.
