= Degersheim =

- Municipality
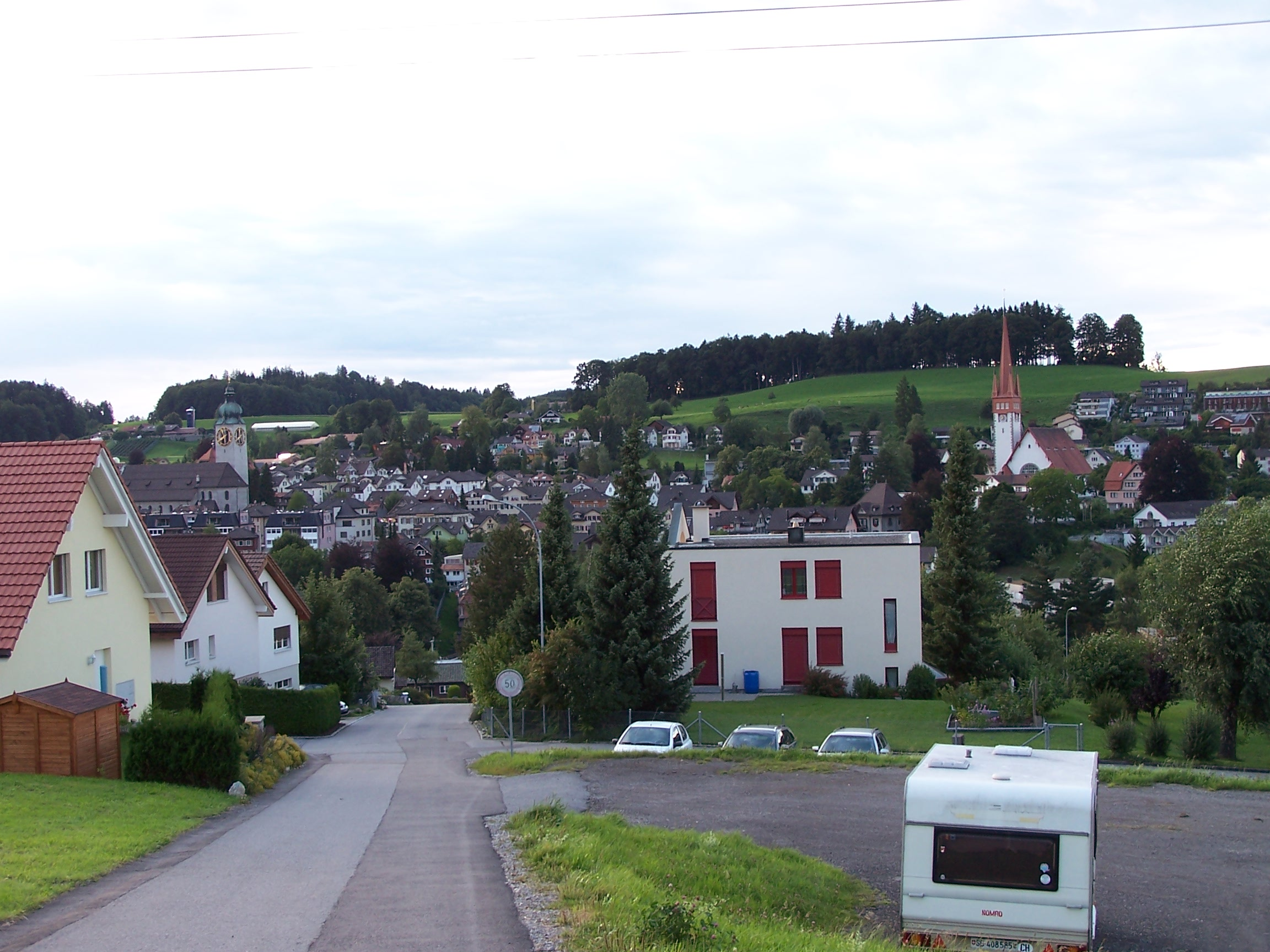
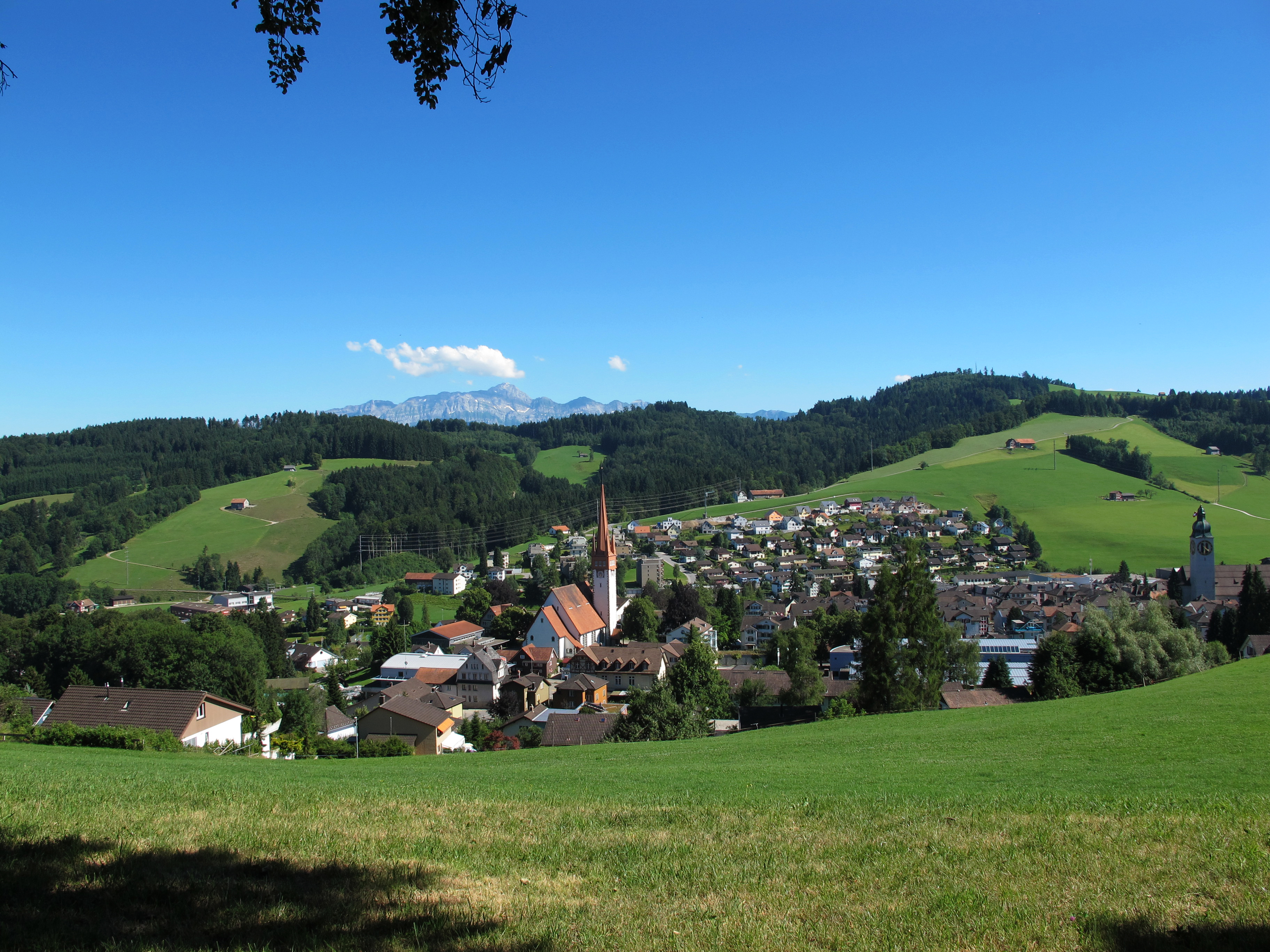

- Flag Coat of arms
- Location of Degersheim
- Location within Switzerland Location within Canton of St. Gallen
- Coordinates: 47°22′N 9°12′E
- Country: Switzerland
- Canton: St. Gallen
- District: Wil

Government
  - Mayor: Monika Scherrer

Area
  - Total: 14.48 km^{2} (5.59 sq mi)
- Elevation: 819 m (2,687 ft)

Population (December 2020)
  - Total: 4,099
  - Density: 283.1/km^{2} (733.2/sq mi)
- Time zone: UTC+01:00 (CET)
  - Summer (DST): UTC+02:00 (CEST)
- Postal code: 9113
- SFOS number: 3401
- ISO 3166 code: CH-SG
- Surrounded by: Flawil, Herisau (AR), Lütisburg, Mogelsberg, Oberuzwil, Sankt Peterzell, Schwellbrunn (AR)
- Website: www.degersheim.ch

Degersheim is a municipality in the Wahlkreis (constituency) of Wil in the canton of St. Gallen in Switzerland.

== History ==
Degersheim is first mentioned in 837 as Tegarascai. It was known as Tegerschen until 1803, when Degersheim became the official name. The village of Wolfertswil is mentioned in 838 as Wolfrideswilare.

== Geography ==
Aerial view by Walter Mittelholzer (1922)

Degersheim has an area, as of 2006, of 14.4 km^{2} (5.6 sq mi). Of this area, 53.4% is used for agricultural purposes, while 36.5% is forested. Of the rest of the land, 10% is settled (buildings or roads) and the remainder (0.1%) is non-productive (rivers or lakes). The municipality operates a ski area during winter.

It consists of the village of Degersheim and the hamlets of Magdenau with the abbey, Wolfertswil, Hinterschwil, the exclave Obergampen and a number of scattered farm houses.

== Coat of arms ==
The blazon of the municipal coat of arms is Per pale sable an Ash tree eradicated Or and Or a Cross Lorraine Sable.

== Demographics ==
Degersheim has a population (as of 31 December 2020) of 4,099. As of 2007, about 17.2% of the population was made up of foreign nationals. Of the foreign population, (as of 2000), 40 are from Germany, 147 are from Italy, 275 are from ex-Yugoslavia, 27 are from Austria, 34 are from Turkey, and 183 are from another country. Over the last 10 years the population has decreased at a rate of -1.5%. Most of the population (as of 2000) speaks German (89.9%), with Italian being second most common ( 2.3%) and Spanish being third ( 1.8%). Of the Swiss national languages (as of 2000), 3,551 speak German, 8 people speak French, 91 people speak Italian, and 6 people speak Romansh.

The age distribution, as of 2000, in Degersheim is; 515 children or 13.0% of the population are between 0 and 9 years old and 636 teenagers or 16.1% are between 10 and 19. Of the adult population, 428 people or 10.8% of the population are between 20 and 29 years old. 553 people or 14.0% are between 30 and 39, 585 people or 14.8% are between 40 and 49, and 479 people or 12.1% are between 50 and 59. The senior population distribution is 326 people or 8.2% of the population are between 60 and 69 years old, 224 people or 5.7% are between 70 and 79, there are 169 people or 4.3% who are between 80 and 89, and there are 36 people or 0.9% who are between 90 and 99, and 1 person who is 100 or more.

In 2000 there were 486 persons (or 12.3% of the population) who were living alone in a private dwelling. There were 769 (or 19.5%) persons who were part of a couple (married or otherwise committed) without children, and 2,286 (or 57.8%) who were part of a couple with children. There were 197 (or 5.0%) people who lived in single parent home, while there are 25 persons who were adult children living with one or both parents, 16 persons who lived in a household made up of relatives, 8 who lived household made up of unrelated persons, and 165 who are either institutionalized or live in another type of collective housing.

In the 2007 federal election the most popular party was the SVP which received 32.1% of the vote. The next three most popular parties were the CVP (19.7%), the FDP (16%) and the SP (13.9%).

The entire Swiss population is generally well educated. In Degersheim about 68.2% of the population (between age 25-64) have completed either non-mandatory upper secondary education or additional higher education (either University or a Fachhochschule). Out of the total population in Degersheim, as of 2000, the highest education level completed by 906 people (22.9% of the population) was Primary, while 1,329 (33.6%) have completed Secondary, 397 (10.0%) have attended a Tertiary school, and 191 (4.8%) are not in school. The remainder did not answer this question.

The historical population is given in the following table:

year	population
1816	1,067
1850	1,620
1900	3,414
1910	3,766
1941	2,966
1950	3,186
2000	3,952

== Heritage sites of national significance ==
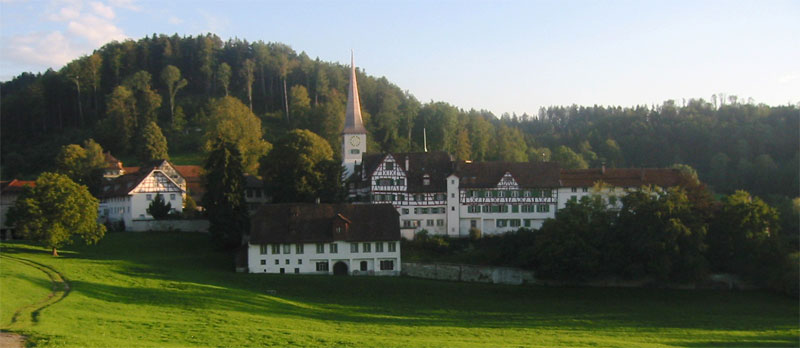
Magdenau Abbey and church

The former parish church of St. Verena in Magdenau and the Cistercian abbey at Magdenau are listed as Swiss heritage sites of national significance.

The village of Degersheim is designated as part of the Inventory of Swiss Heritage Sites.

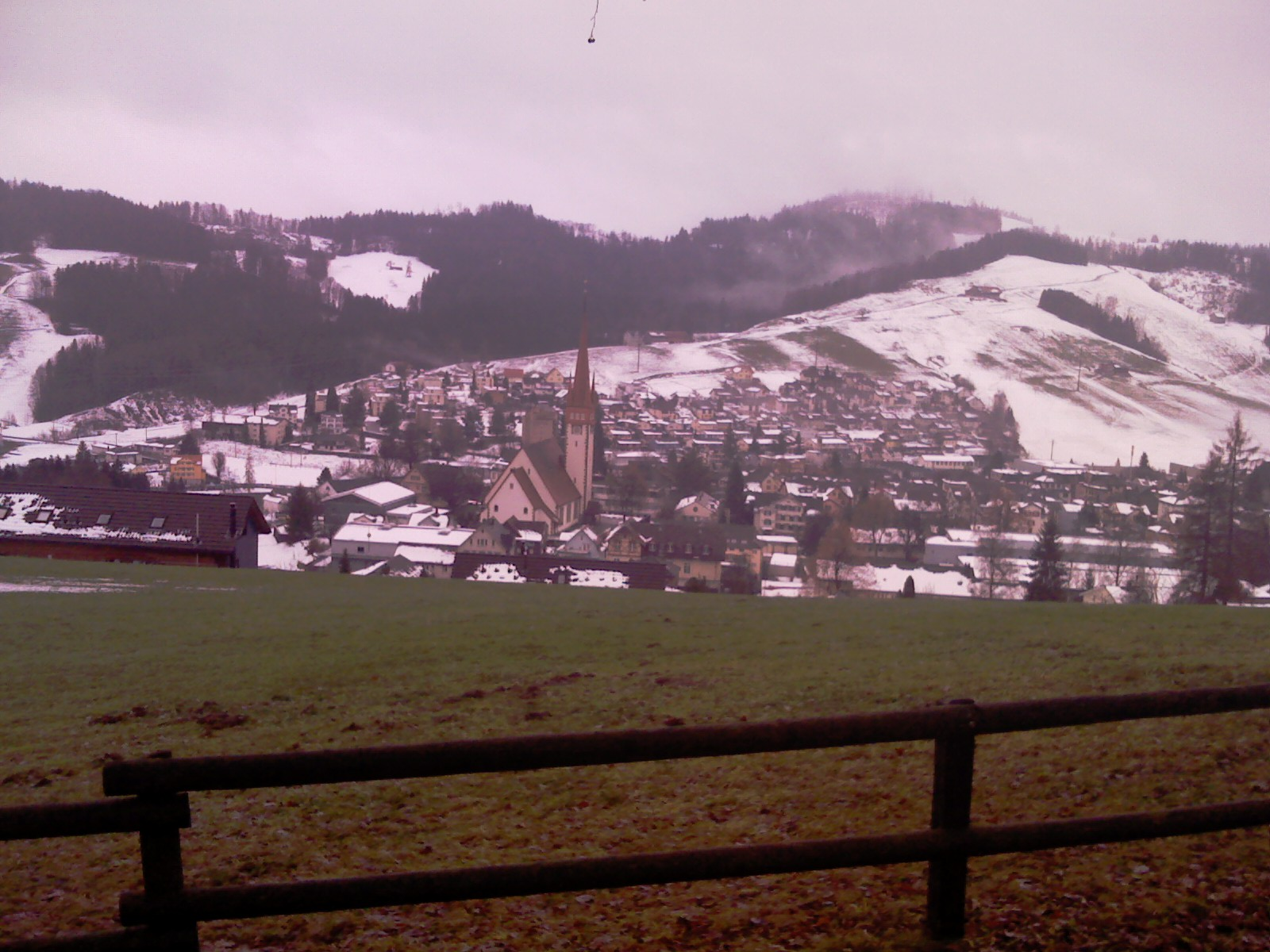
Degersheim Panoramo en vintro (Foto Dietrich Michael Weidmann)

== Economy ==
As of 2007, Degersheim had an unemployment rate of 1.25%. As of 2005, there were 138 people employed in the primary economic sector and about 50 businesses involved in this sector. 820 people are employed in the secondary sector and there are 64 businesses in this sector. 604 people are employed in the tertiary sector, with 114 businesses in this sector.

As of October 2009 the average unemployment rate was 2.9%. There were 226 businesses in the municipality of which 64 were involved in the secondary sector of the economy while 114 were involved in the third.

As of 2000 there were 1,016 residents who worked in the municipality, while 989 residents worked outside Degersheim and 695 people commuted into the municipality for work.

== Religion ==
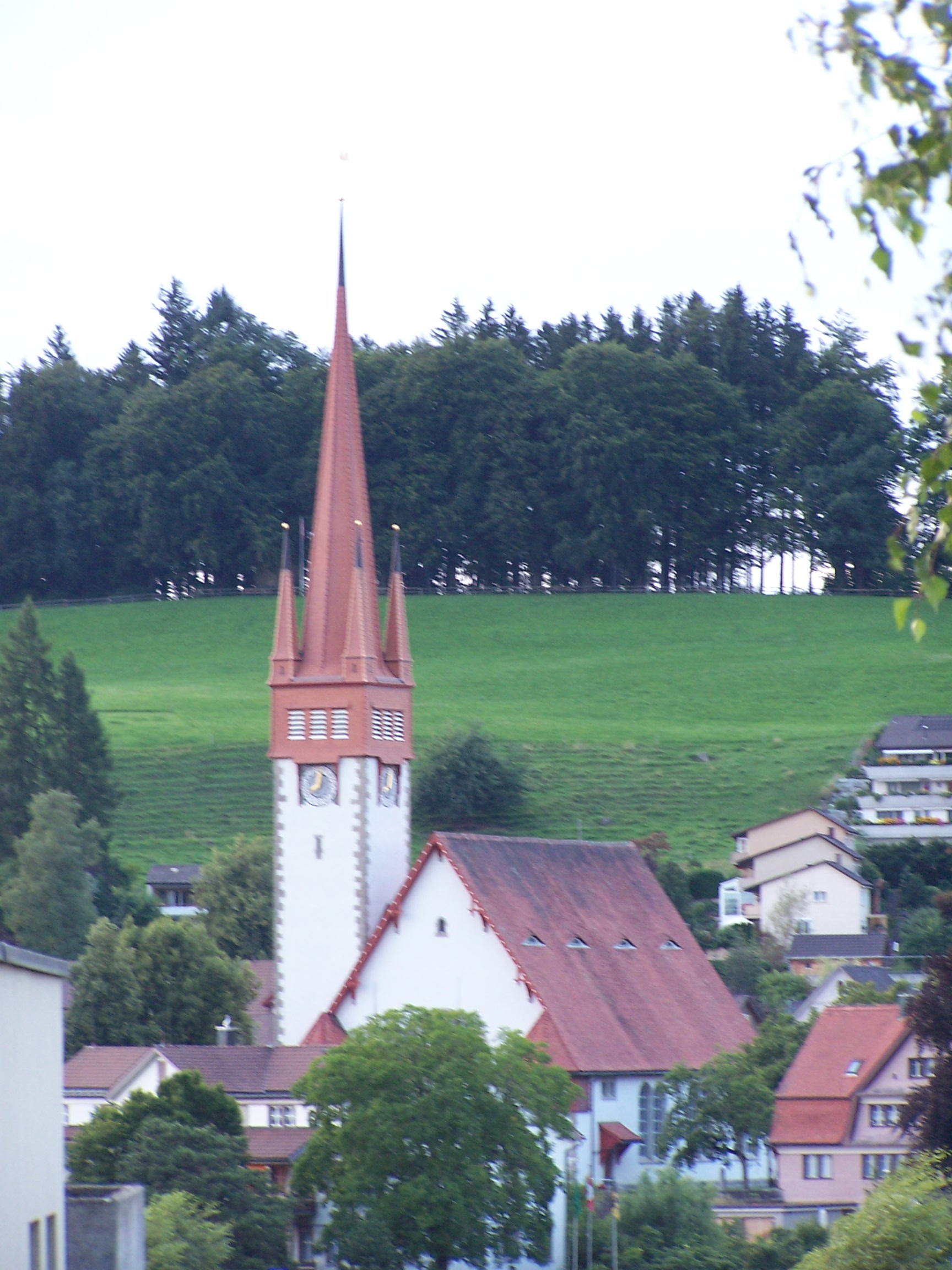
Swiss Reformed Church in Degersheim

From the 2000 census, 1,739 or 44.0% are Roman Catholic, while 1,343 or 34.0% belonged to the Swiss Reformed Church. Of the rest of the population, there are 74 individuals (or about 1.87% of the population) who belong to the Orthodox Church, and there are 196 individuals (or about 4.96% of the population) who belong to another Christian church. There is 1 individual who is Jewish, and 209 (or about 5.29% of the population) who are Islamic. There are 28 individuals (or about 0.71% of the population) who belong to another church (not listed on the census), 263 (or about 6.65% of the population) belong to no church, are agnostic or atheist, and 99 individuals (or about 2.51% of the population) did not answer the question.

== Weather ==
Degersheim has an average of 153.6 days of rain or snow per year and on average receives 1,549 mm (61.0 in) of precipitation. The wettest month is June during which time Degersheim receives an average of 193 mm (7.6 in) of rain or snow. During this month there is precipitation for an average of 15.1 days. The month with the most days of precipitation is May, with an average of 15.1, but with only 163 mm (6.4 in) of rain or snow. The driest month of the year is January with an average of 90 mm (3.5 in) of precipitation over 15.1 days.

== See also ==
- Degersheim railway station
