= Mogelsberg =

- Former municipality
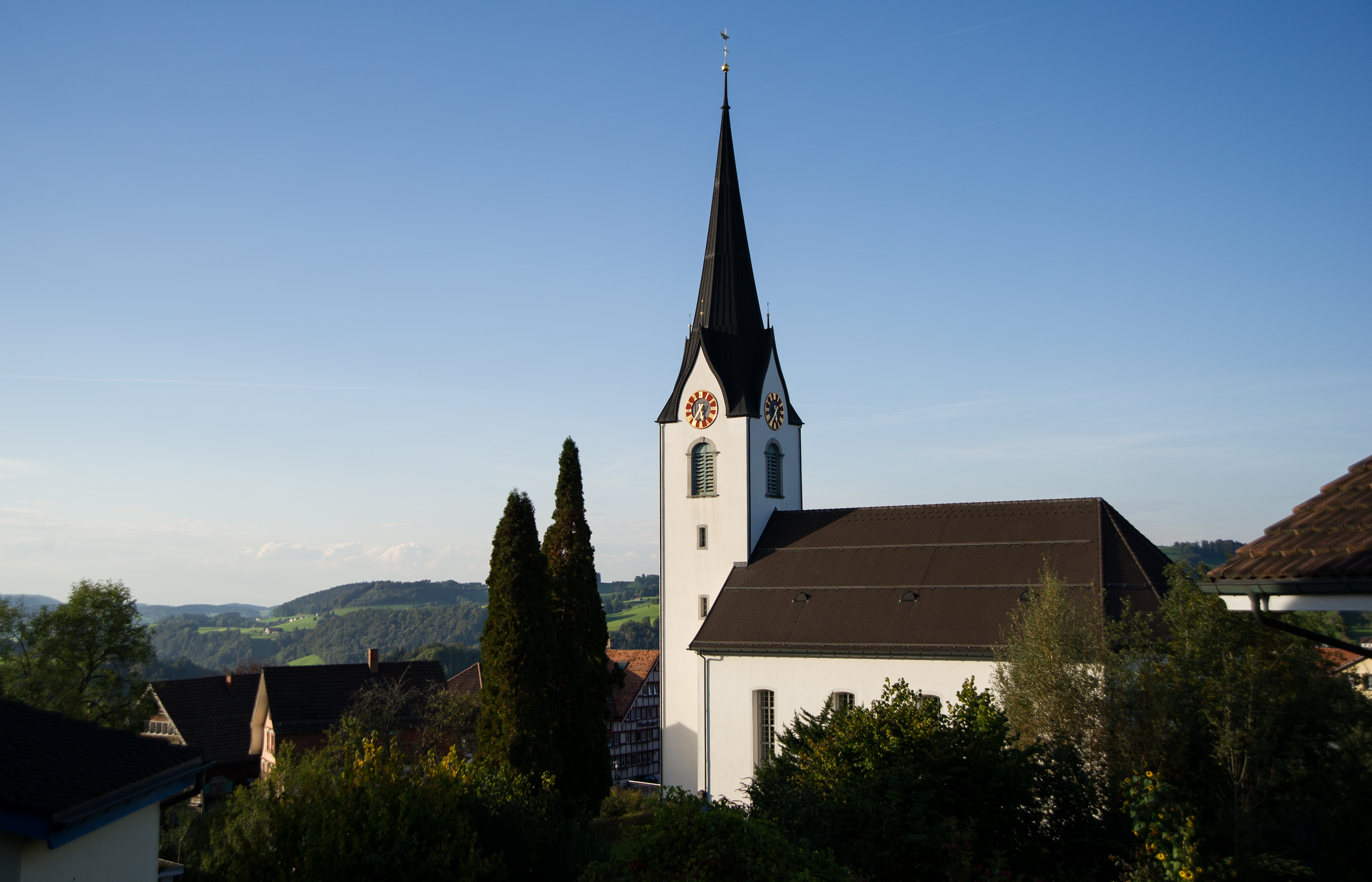

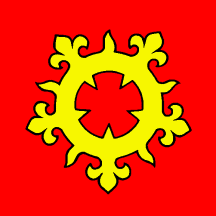
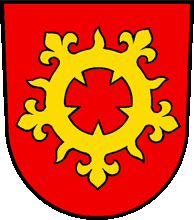
- Flag Coat of arms
- Location of Mogelsberg
- Location within Switzerland Location within Canton of St. Gallen
- Coordinates: 47°21′44.8164″N 9°8′9.4056″E
- Country: Switzerland
- Canton: St. Gallen
- District: Toggenburg

Area
  - Total: 32.96 km^{2} (12.73 sq mi)
- Elevation: 755 m (2,477 ft)

Population (January 2004)
  - Total: 2,213
  - Density: 67.14/km^{2} (173.9/sq mi)
- Time zone: UTC+01:00 (CET)
  - Summer (DST): UTC+02:00 (CEST)
- Postal code: 9122
- SFOS number: 3406
- ISO 3166 code: CH-SG
- Surrounded by: Brunnadern, Degersheim, Ganterschwil, Hemberg, Lütisburg, Oberhelfenschwil, Sankt Peterzell, Schwellbrunn (AR)
- Website: Official website

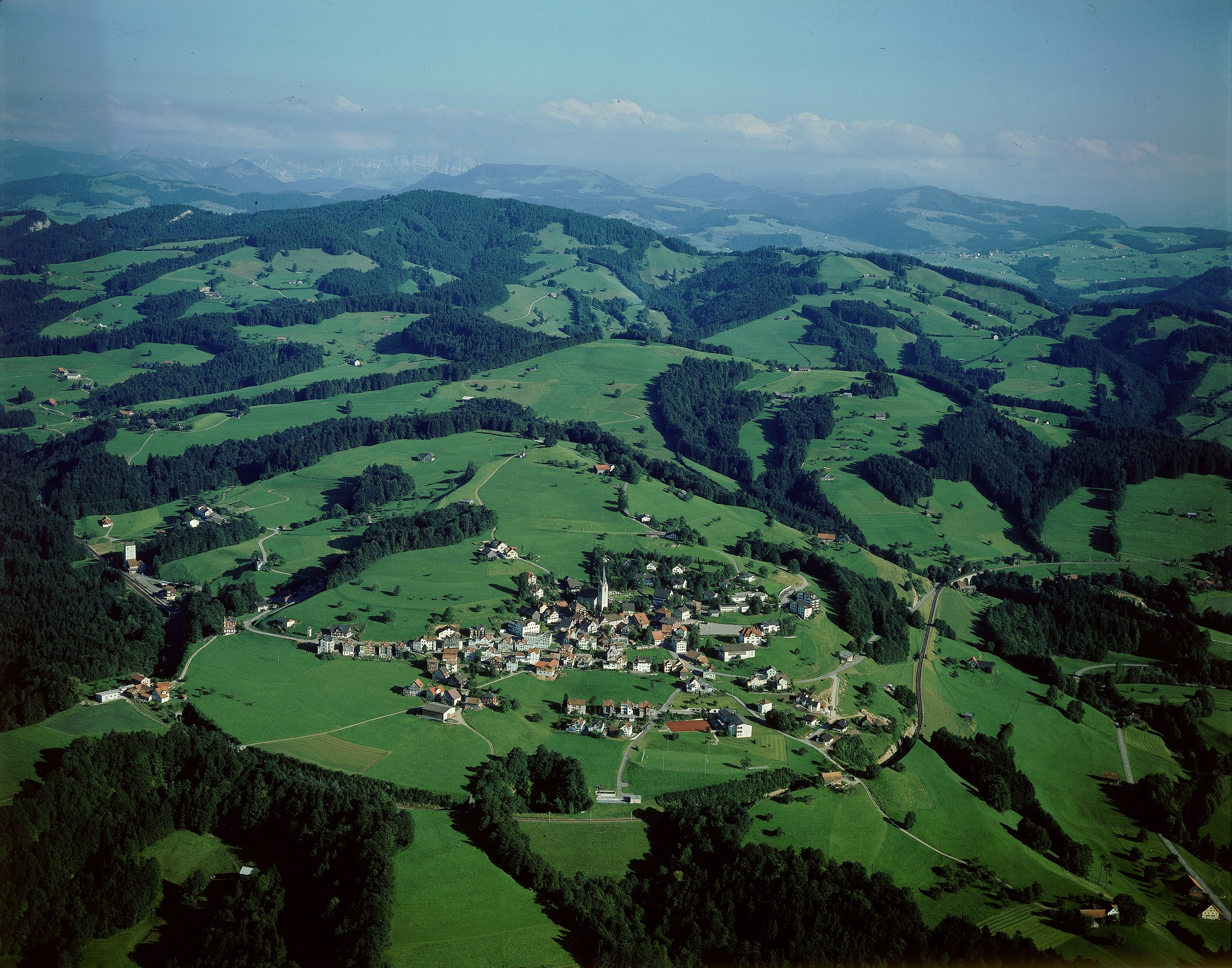
Aerial view (1980)

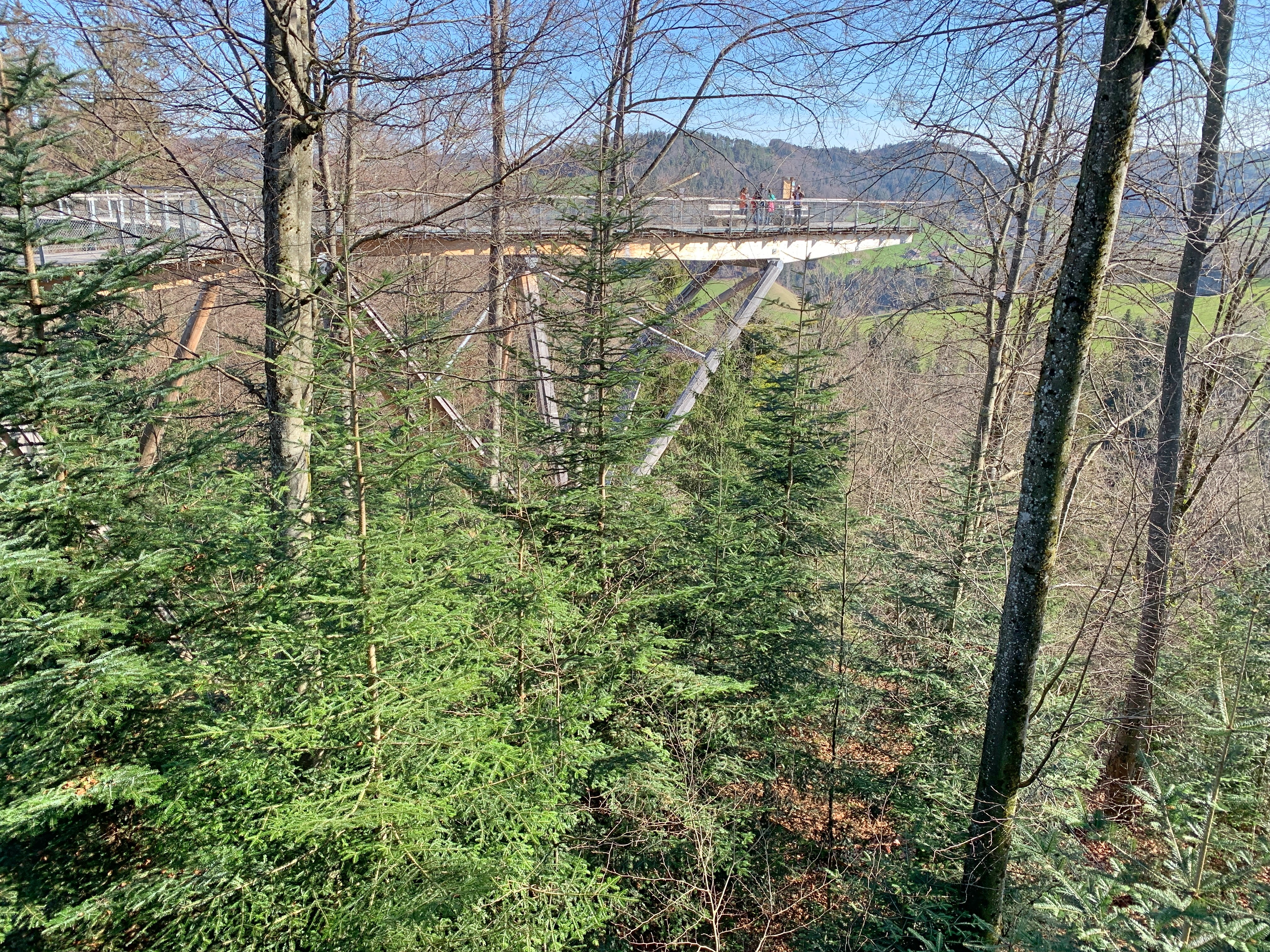
Canopy walkway Neckertal

Mogelsberg is a former municipality in the Wahlkreis (constituency) of Toggenburg in the canton of St. Gallen in Switzerland. On January 1, 2009, it merged with Brunnadern and St. Peterzell to form the municipality of Neckertal.

== Canopy walkway ==
The Baumwipfelpfad Neckertal above Mogelsberg is a 500 metres (1,600 ft) long and up to 15 metres (49 ft) high canopy walkway.

== See also ==
- Mogelsberg railway station
