= Neckertal =

- Municipality
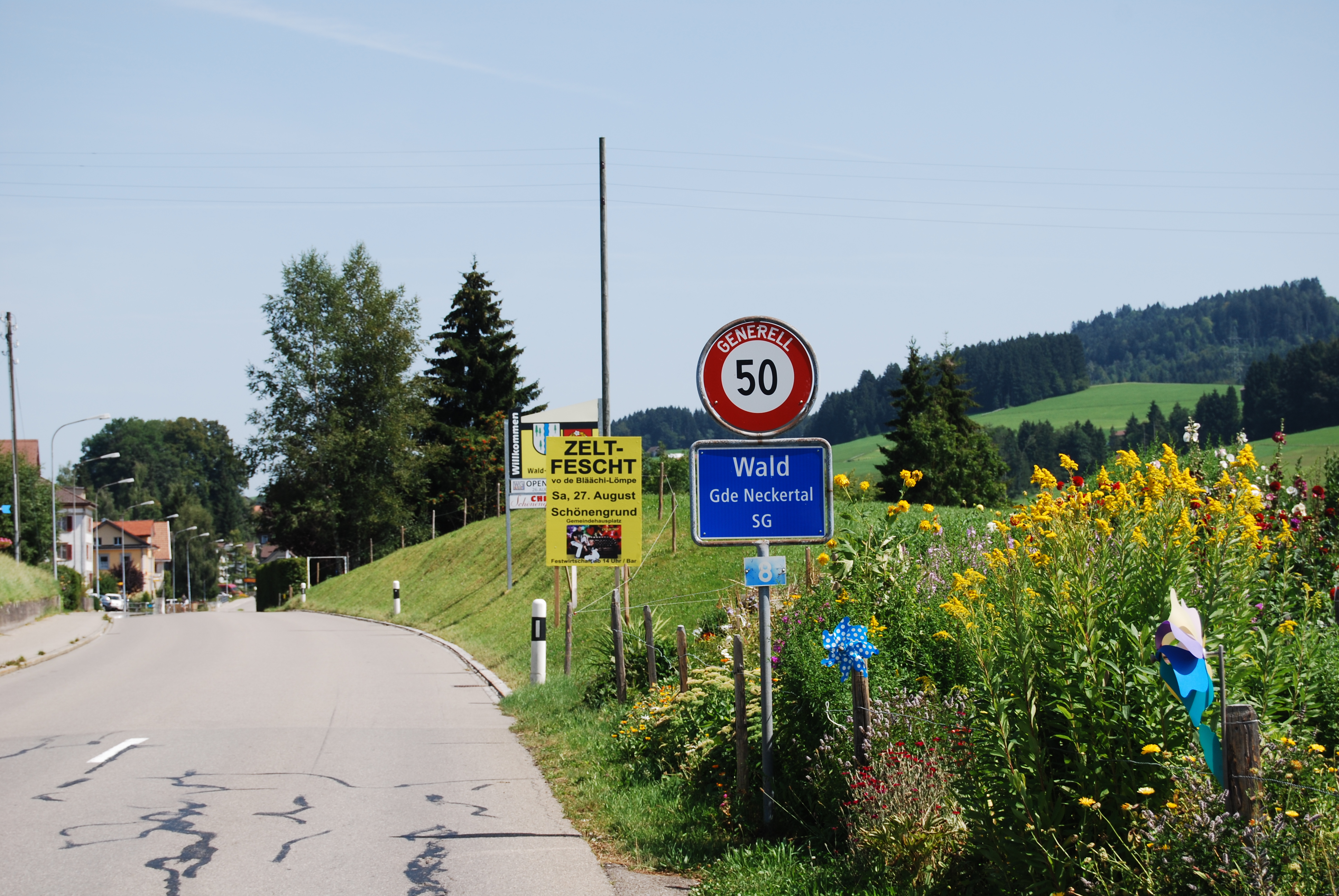

- Flag Coat of arms
- Location of Neckertal
- Location within Switzerland Location within Canton of St. Gallen
- Coordinates: 47°20′N 9°8′E
- Country: Switzerland
- Canton: St. Gallen
- District: Toggenburg

Area
  - Total: 49.03 km^{2} (18.93 sq mi)
- Elevation: 660 m (2,170 ft)

Population (December 2020)
  - Total: 4,064
  - Density: 82.89/km^{2} (214.7/sq mi)
- Time zone: UTC+01:00 (CET)
  - Summer (DST): UTC+02:00 (CEST)
- Postal codes: 9105 Wald/Schönengrund; 9115 Dicken; 9122 Mogelsberg; 9123 Nassen; 9125 Brunnadern; 9126 Necker; 9127 St. Peterzell; 9621 Oberhelfenschwil; 9633 Hemberg
- SFOS number: 3396
- ISO 3166 code: CH-SG
- Localities: Brunnadern, St. Peterzell, Mogelsberg, Wald-Schönengrund, Nassen, Hoffeld, Ebersol, Dicken, Dieselbach, Necker, Oberhelfenschwil, Hemberg
- Surrounded by: Oberhelfenschwil, Wattwil, Hemberg, Degersheim, Ganterschwil, Lütisburg, Schwellbrunn (AR), Schönengrund (AR)
- Website: www.neckertal.ch

Neckertal is a municipality in the Toggenburg district of the Canton of St. Gallen, Switzerland.

It was formed on January 1, 2009, through the merger of Brunnadern, St. Peterzell, and Mogelsberg. On 1 January 2023 the former municipalities of Hemberg and Oberhelfenschwil merged into the new municipality of Neckertal.

== Geography ==
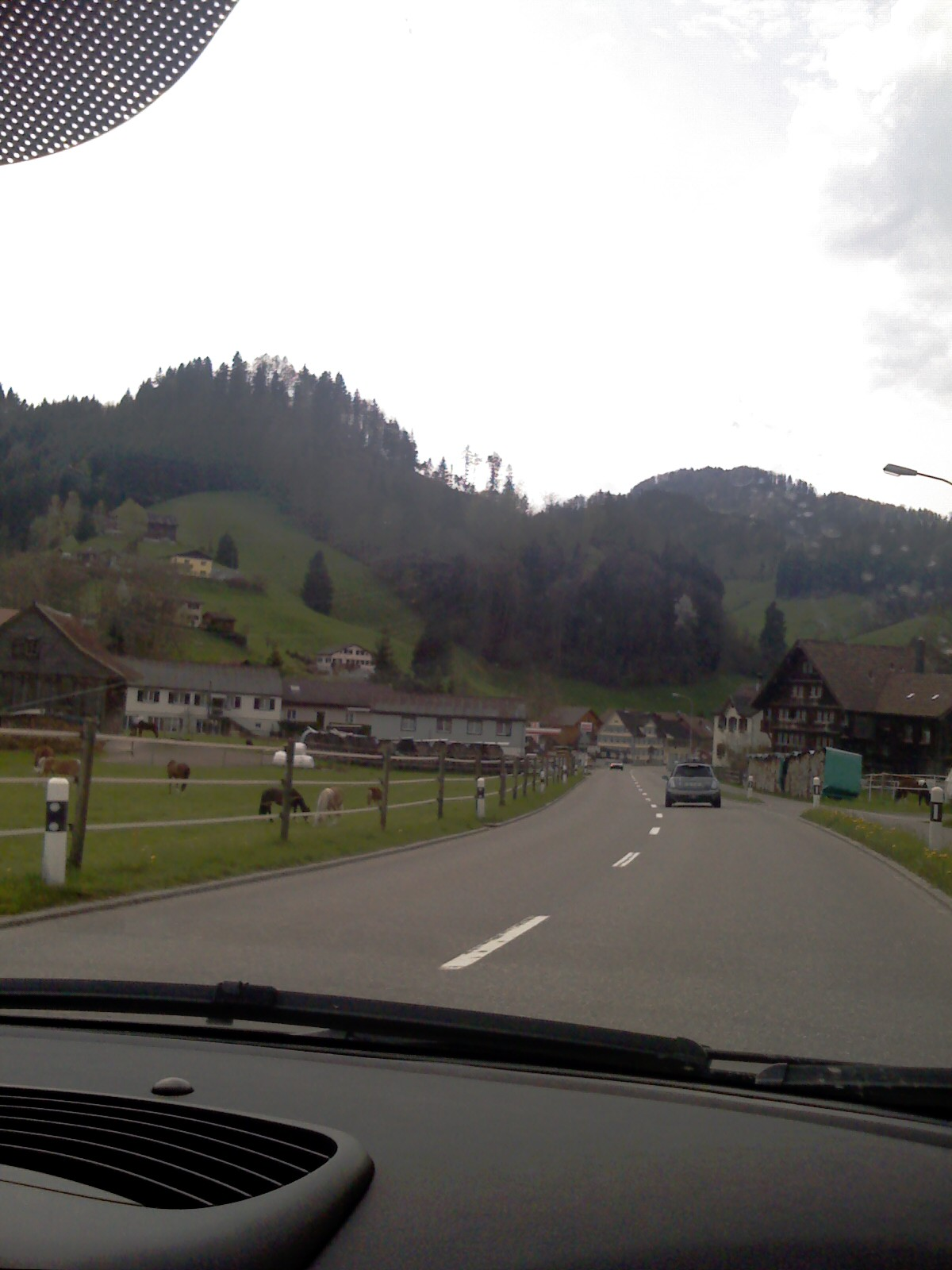
Mogelsberg

Neckertal has an area of 49 km^{2} (18.92 sq mi). As of 2012, a total of 26.17 km^{2} (10.10 mi^{2}) or 53.4% is used for agricultural purposes, while 19.51 km^{2} (7.53 mi^{2}) or 39.8% is forested. The rest of the municipality is 2.8 km^{2} (1.1 mi^{2}) or 5.7% is settled (buildings or roads), 0.29 km^{2} (0.11 mi^{2}) or 0.6% is either rivers or lakes and 0.23 km^{2} (0.089 mi^{2}) or 0.5% is unproductive land.

During the same year, housing and buildings made up 3.0% and transportation infrastructure made up 2.0%. A total of 36.9% of the total land area is heavily forested and 2.9% is covered with orchards or small clusters of trees. Of the agricultural land, 51.7% is pasturage and 1.1% is used for alpine pastures. All the water in the municipality is flowing water.

It is made up of the villages of Brunnadern, St. Peterzell, and Mogelsberg as well as the hamlets of Wald-Schönengrund, Dicken, Nassen, Hoffeld, Dieselbach, Ebersol and Necker.

== Demographics ==
Neckertal has a population (as of December 2020) of 4,064. As of 2012, 7.9% of the population are resident foreign nationals. Between the last 2 years (2010–2012) the population changed at a rate of −2.0%. Migration accounted for −2.1%, while births and deaths accounted for 0.2%.

Most of the population (as of 2000) speaks German (95.5%) as their first language, French is the second most common (0.2%) and Italian is the third (0.9%).

As of 2012, children and teenagers (0–19 years old) make up 23.8% of the population, while adults (20–64 years old) make up 60.8% and seniors (over 64 years old) make up 15.3%.

As of 2010, there were 460 households that consist of only one person and 206 households with five or more people. As of 2012, the construction rate of new housing units was 0.5 new units per 1000 residents. The vacancy rate for the municipality, in 2013, was 0.7%. In 2012, single family homes made up 56.9% of the total housing in the municipality.

On 1 January 2009 there were 1,838 households in the municipality.

== Historic population ==
The historical population is given in the following chart:

== Economy ==
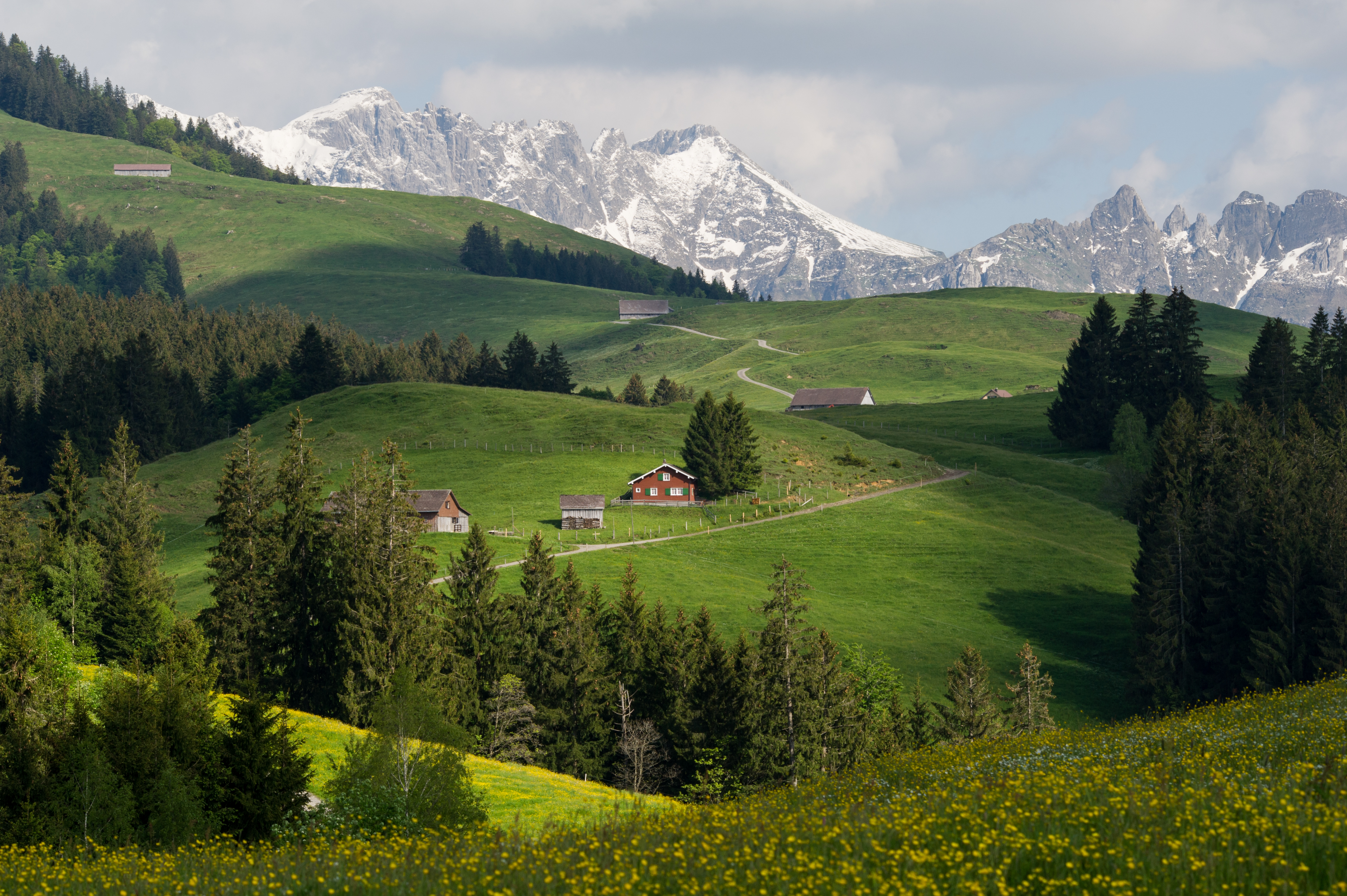
On the edge of the Naturpark Neckertal

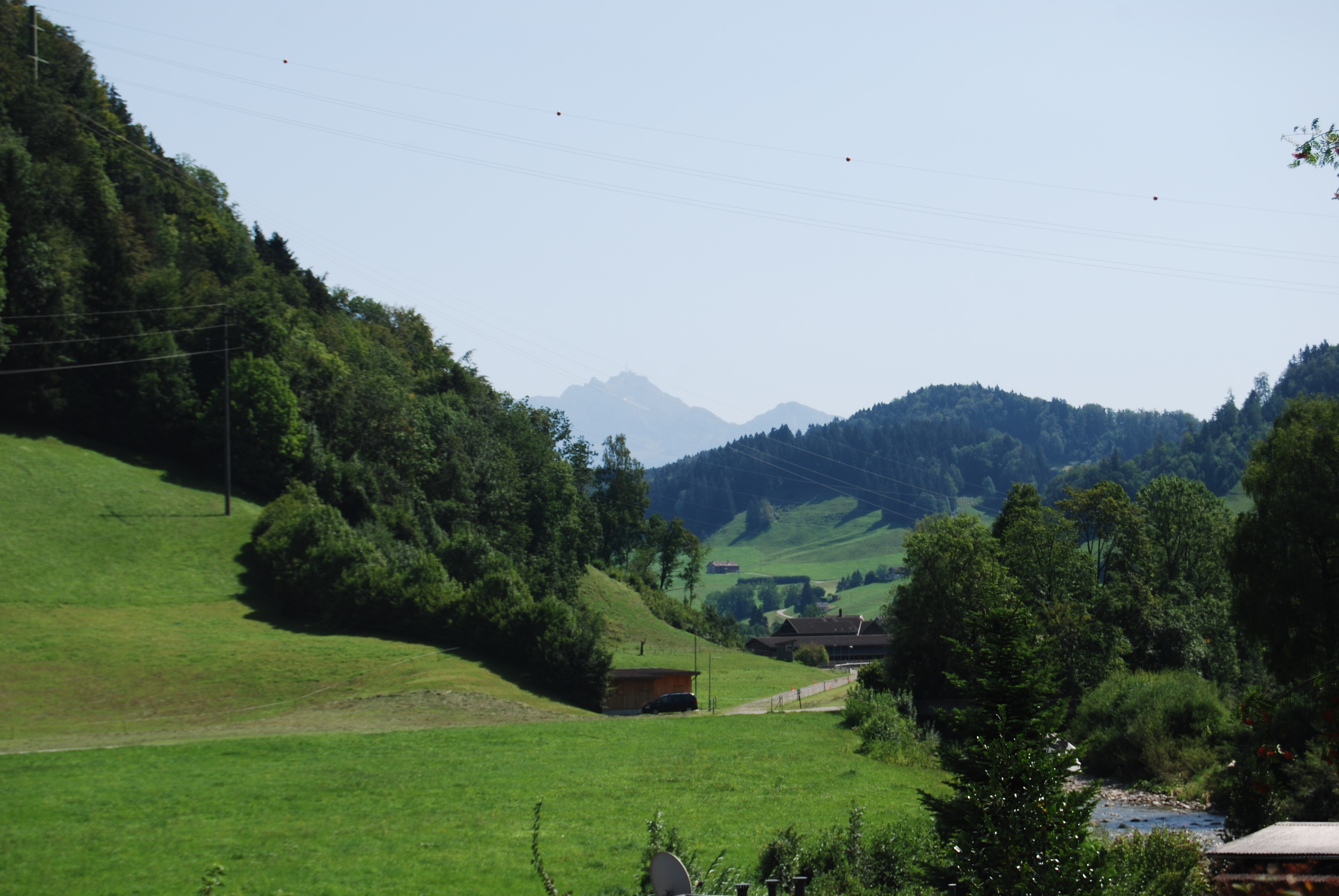
Brunnadern

As of 2011, Neckertal had an unemployment rate of 1.51%. As of 2011, there were a total of 1,531 people employed in the municipality. Of these, there were 374 people employed in the primary economic sector and about 168 businesses involved in this sector. 404 people were employed in the secondary sector and there were 76 businesses in this sector. 753 people were employed in the tertiary sector, with 190 businesses in this sector. Of the working population, 14.5% used public transportation to get to work, and 46.1% used a private car.

In 2012 the average local and cantonal tax rate on a married resident, with two children, of Neckertal making 150,000 CHF was 10.6%, while an unmarried resident's rate was 17.9%. For comparison, the average rate for the entire canton in 2011, was 11.9% and 20.7%, while the nationwide average was 12.3% and 21.1% respectively.

In 2010 there were a total of 1,636 tax payers in the municipality. Of that total, 419 made over 75,000 CHF per year. There were 33 people who made between 15,000 and 20,000 per year. The greatest number of workers, 436, made between 50,000 and 75,000 CHF per year. The average income of the over 75,000 CHF group in Neckertal was 110,379 CHF, while the average across all of Switzerland was 131,244 CHF.

In 2011 a total of 0.0% of the population received direct financial assistance from the government.

== Heritage sites of national significance ==
There are three buildings in Mogelsberg that are listed as Swiss heritage sites of national significance. They are the Haus Näf, the Oberes Türmlihaus and the Unteres Türmlihaus. The entire village of Mogelsberg and the Spreitenbach / Furth area are both part of the Inventory of Swiss Heritage Sites.

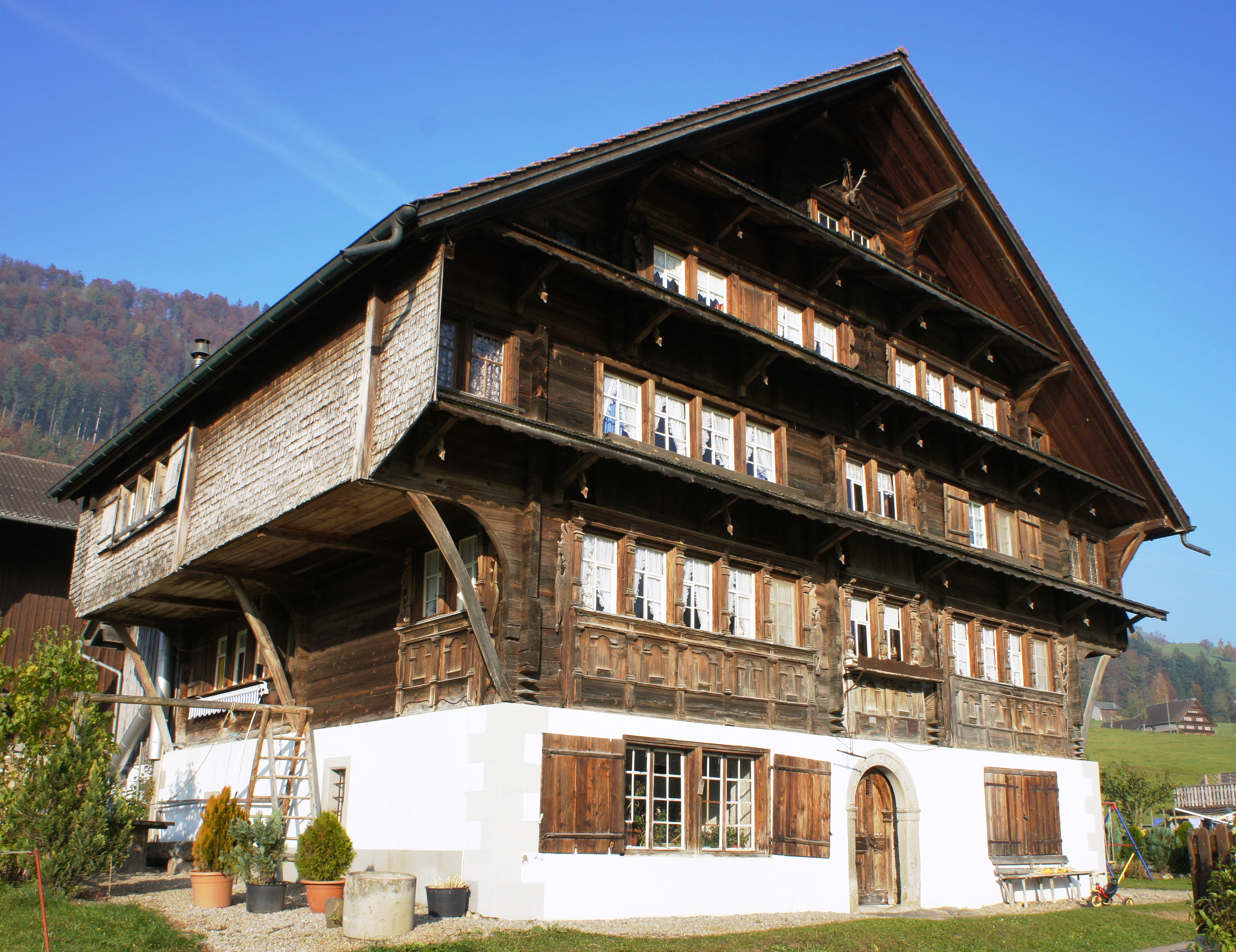
Haus Näf at Furt 520

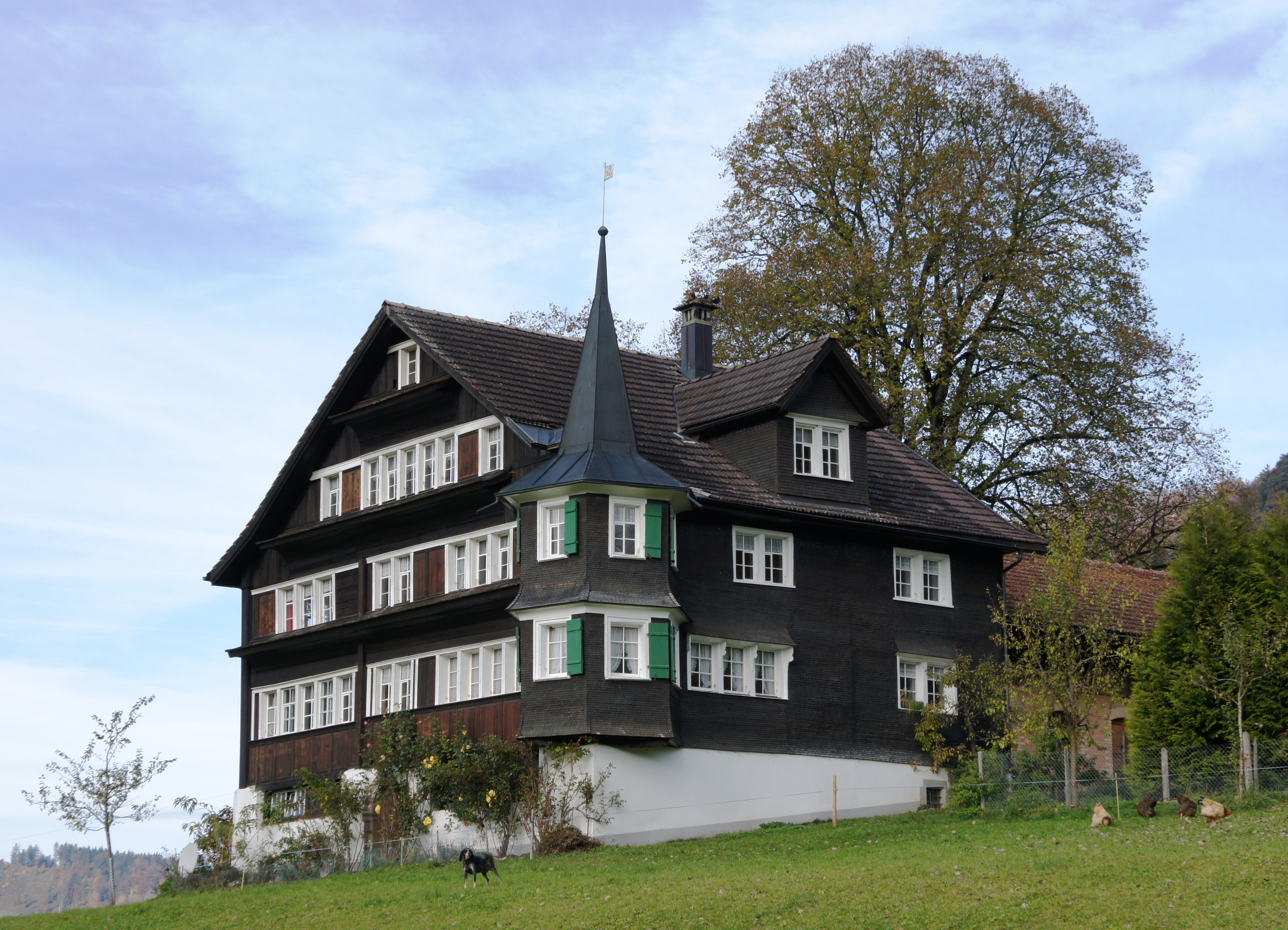
Oberes Türmlihaus at Furtstrasse 93

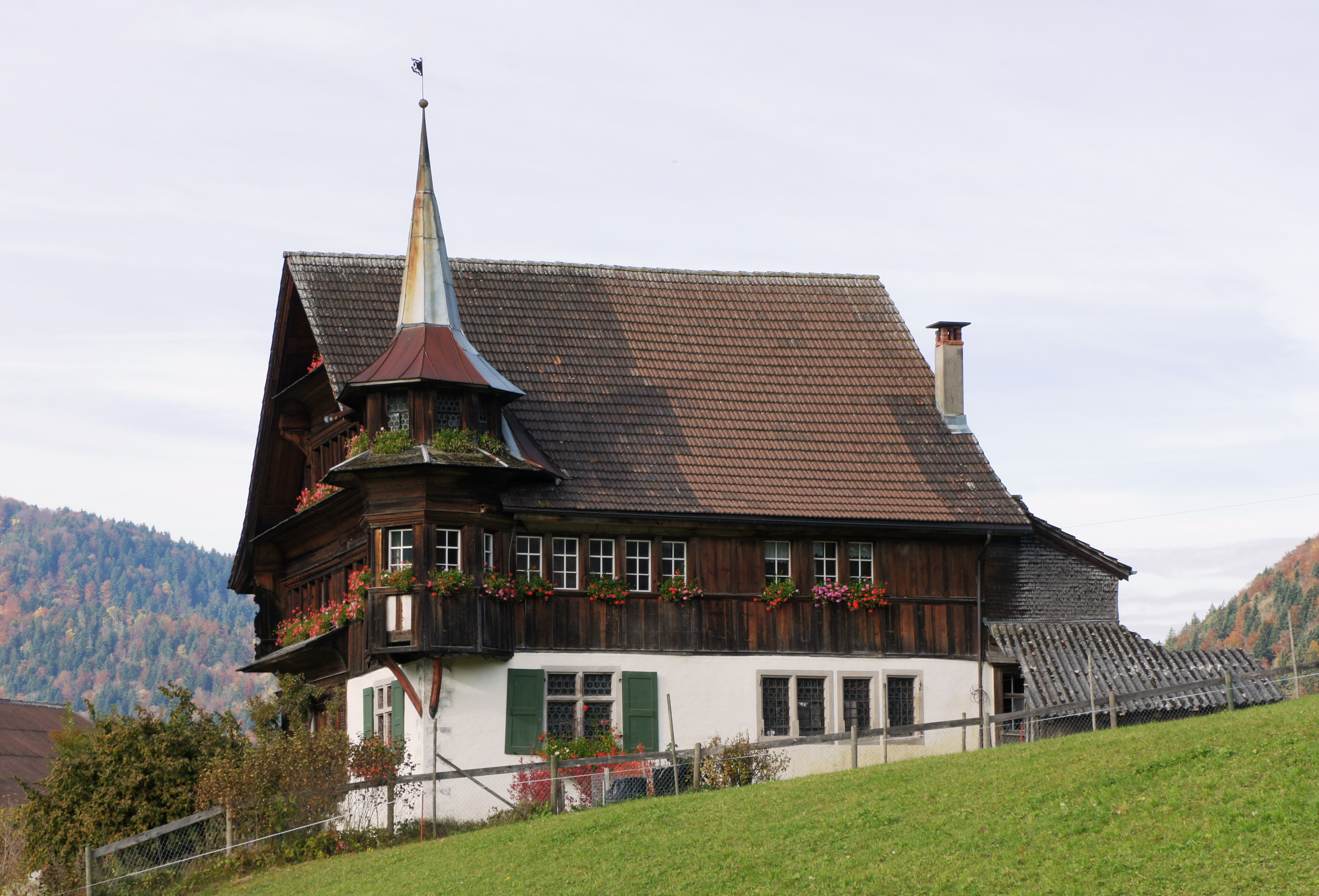
Unteres Türmlihaus at Furtstrasse 95

== Politics ==
In the 2011 federal election the most popular party was the Swiss People's Party (SVP) which received 37.1% of the vote. The next three most popular parties were the Christian Democratic People's Party (CVP) (17.4%), the FDP.The Liberals (13.7%) and the Social Democratic Party (SP) (12.3%). In the federal election, a total of 1,377 votes were cast, and the voter turnout was 46.5%.

== Religion ==
In 2000 about 53.9% of the population belonged to a Protestant church, 31.2% were Roman Catholic and 7.5% had no religious affiliation.

== Education ==
In Neckertal about 51.4% of the population have completed non-mandatory upper secondary education, and 14.5% have completed additional higher education (either university or a Fachhochschule).
