= Dermot Morrah =

British journalist

- Born: Dermot Michael Macgregor Morrah; 26 April 1896
- Died: 30 September 1974 (aged 78)
- Education: New College, Oxford; All Souls College, Oxford
- Occupation: Journalist
- Writing career
- Subject: British royal family

Dermot Michael Macgregor Morrah (26 April 1896 – 30 September 1974) was a British journalist for The Times and an expert on the British royal family.

== Education ==
Morrah was educated at Winchester College and went to New College, Oxford, where he studied mathematics for a year just before the outbreak of the First World War before enlisting in the British Army and fighting in France. There, he was wounded and returned to Oxford, changed his studies to modern history and gained a first-class degree. He became a Prize Fellow of All Souls College, and shared rooms with T. E. Lawrence. After dating his future wife under the eye of a nun who acted as a chaperone, his marriage forced him to end his Prize Fellowship, as they were required to be single.

== Career ==
Morrah was in the Civil Service for six years before joining the editorial staff of the Daily Mail in 1928. A few years later, he joined the editorial staff of The Times, where he worked for 30 years. During this time, he wrote books on Britain's monarchy and its constitution, and later began writing speeches for George VI during the Second World War. His books have included the History of the Times, The Royal Family: The Illustrated Story of the Royal Family's Service to Britain and the Commonwealth, The Work of the Queen and To Be a King, the last being about the early life of Charles, Prince of Wales. From 1945 to 1965, he was editor of The Round Table: A Quarterly Review of British Commonwealth Affairs.

He was an expert on heraldry and genealogy and a good court historian. His unpaid post of Arundel Herald Extraordinary was given to him on 27 April 1953. He had a friendly relationship with Queen Elizabeth The Queen Mother. In 1947, while Elizabeth II was still a princess, Morrah wrote a famous speech of hers given on her 21st birthday in southern Africa, which had been briefly lost in a bar. He was later an aide at the coronation of Elizabeth II.

He also wrote one, highly rated, detective novel, The Mummy Case Mystery.

He was a member of the College of Arms.

== Death ==
Morrah died on 30 September 1974, aged 78.
