= Brunnadern =

- Former municipality
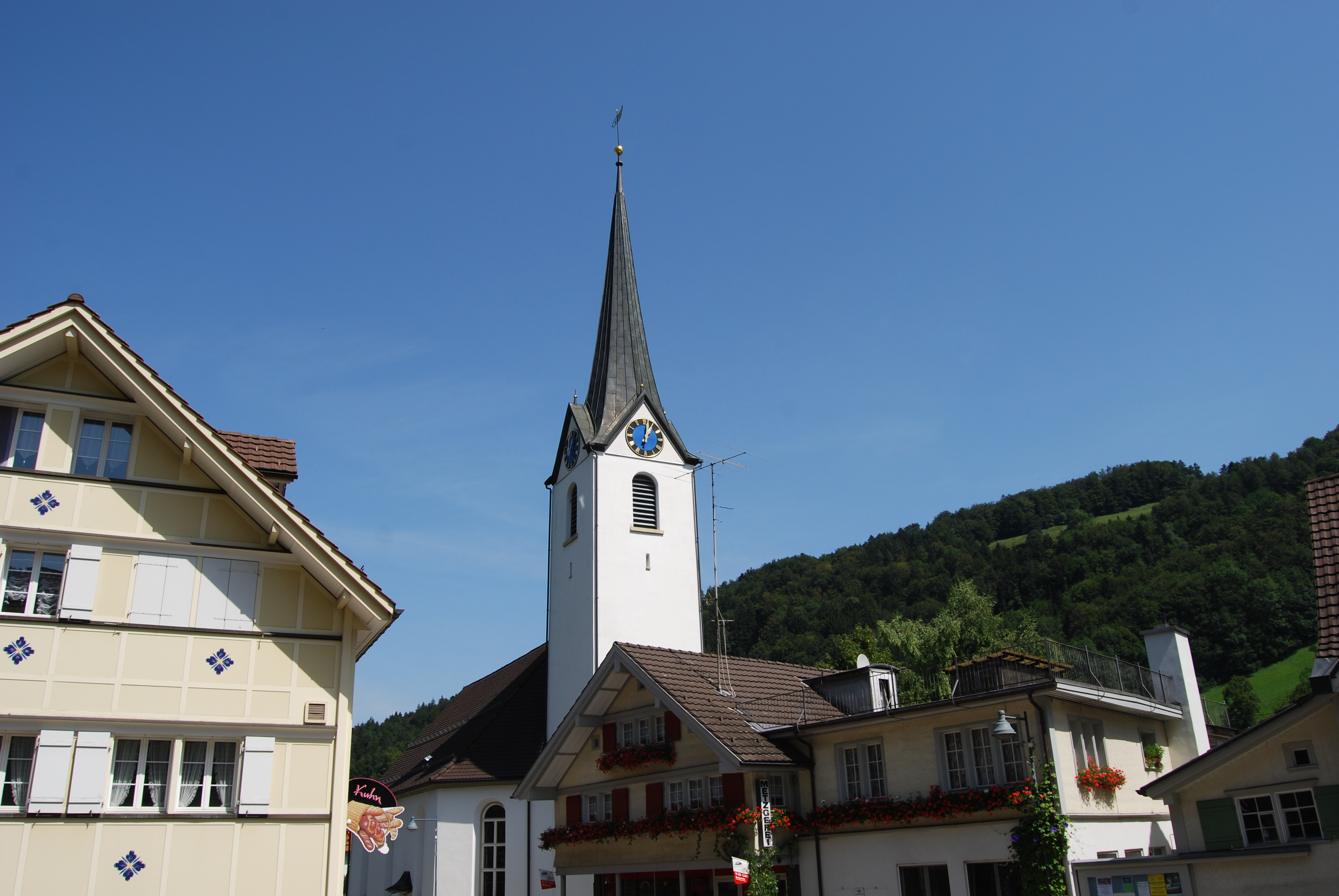

- Coat of arms
- Location of Brunnadern
- Location within Switzerland Location within Canton of St. Gallen
- Coordinates: 47°20′N 9°8′E
- Country: Switzerland
- Canton: St. Gallen
- District: Toggenburg
- Municipality: Neckertal

Area
  - Total: 6.69 km^{2} (2.58 sq mi)
- Elevation: 660 m (2,170 ft)

Population (January 2004)
  - Total: 893
  - Density: 133/km^{2} (346/sq mi)
- Time zone: UTC+01:00 (CET)
  - Summer (DST): UTC+02:00 (CEST)
- Postal code: 9125
- SFOS number: 3371
- ISO 3166 code: CH-SG
- Website: www.brunnadern.ch

Brunnadern is a village in the municipality of Neckertal in the Wahlkreis (constituency) of Toggenburg in the canton of St. Gallen in Switzerland.

Brunnadern was an independent municipality until January 1, 2009, when it merged with Mogelsberg and St. Peterzell to form the municipality of Neckertal.

Aerial view from 1800 m by Walter Mittelholzer (1923)

== See also ==
- Brunnadern-Neckertal railway station
