= Arundel Herald Extraordinary =

- The heraldic badge of Arundel Herald of Arms Extraordinary
- Heraldic tradition: Gallo-British
- Jurisdiction: England, Wales and Northern Ireland
- Governing body: College of Arms

Arundel Herald of Arms Extraordinary is a supernumerary Officer of Arms in England. Though a royal herald, Arundel is not a member of the College of Arms, and was originally a private herald in the household of Thomas Fitzalan, Earl of Arundel. The first herald, John Cosoun, is known to have served the Earl both in Portugal in 1413 and later in France, where he attended his dying master in October 1415. The title was revived in 1727 as Herald Extraordinary.

A badge was assigned to Arundel in 1958, derived from a badge of the Fitzalan earls of the fourteenth century, and a supporter in the arms of the present Earl Marshal of England. It is blazoned A Horse courant Argent in its mouth a Sprig of Oak proper.

== Holders of the office ==
Arms	Name	Date of appointment	Ref
Herald of the Earl of Arundel
	John Cosoun	(1413)	
Herald Extraordinary
	Charles Greene	9 October 1727	
	Francis Huchenson	September 1735	
	John Cheale	16 November 1741	
	Thomas Bewes	26 May 1762	
	Walter Aston Blount	19 July 1830	
	Dermot Michael Macgregor Morrah	27 April 1953	
	Rodney Onslow Dennys	1 October 1982–1993	
	Alan Roger Dickins	7 October 1998–2016	
	Anne Curry	3 May 2022	

== See also ==
- Officer of Arms
- Heraldry
