= Thur (Rhine) =

River in Switzerland

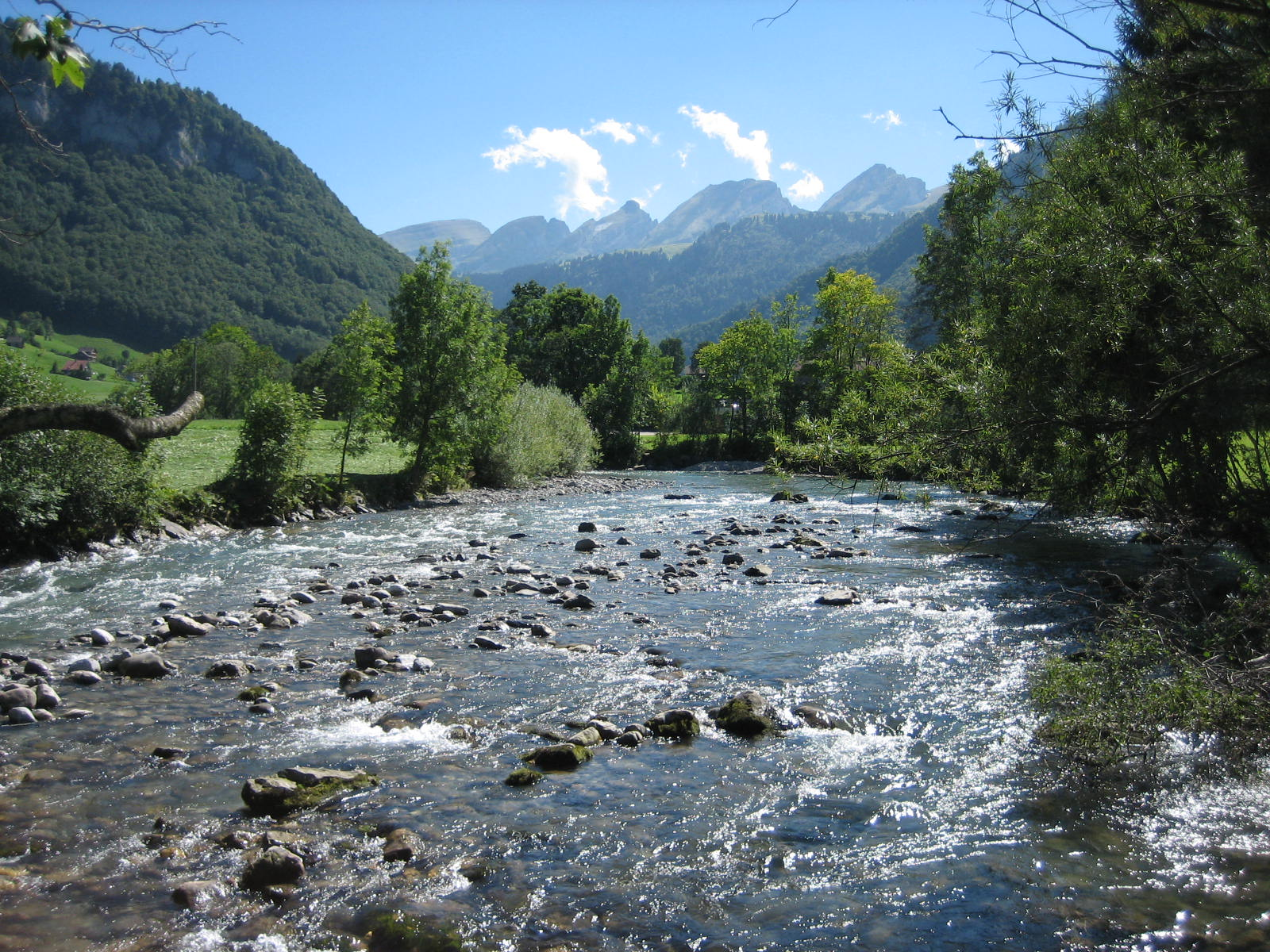
- River Thur and Churfirsten in Toggenburg

Location
- Country: Switzerland
- Cantons: St. Gallen, Thurgau, Zürich

Physical characteristics
- Source
  - location: Wildhaus
  - coordinates: 47.233391°N 9.341527°E
- Mouth
  - location: High Rhine (Hochrhein)
  - coordinates: 47.594474°N 8.590777°E
- Length: 135 km (84 mi)
- Basin size: 1,696 km^{2} (655 sq mi)

Basin features
- Progression: Rhine→ North Sea
- Tributaries
  - left: Murg
  - right: Necker, Sitter

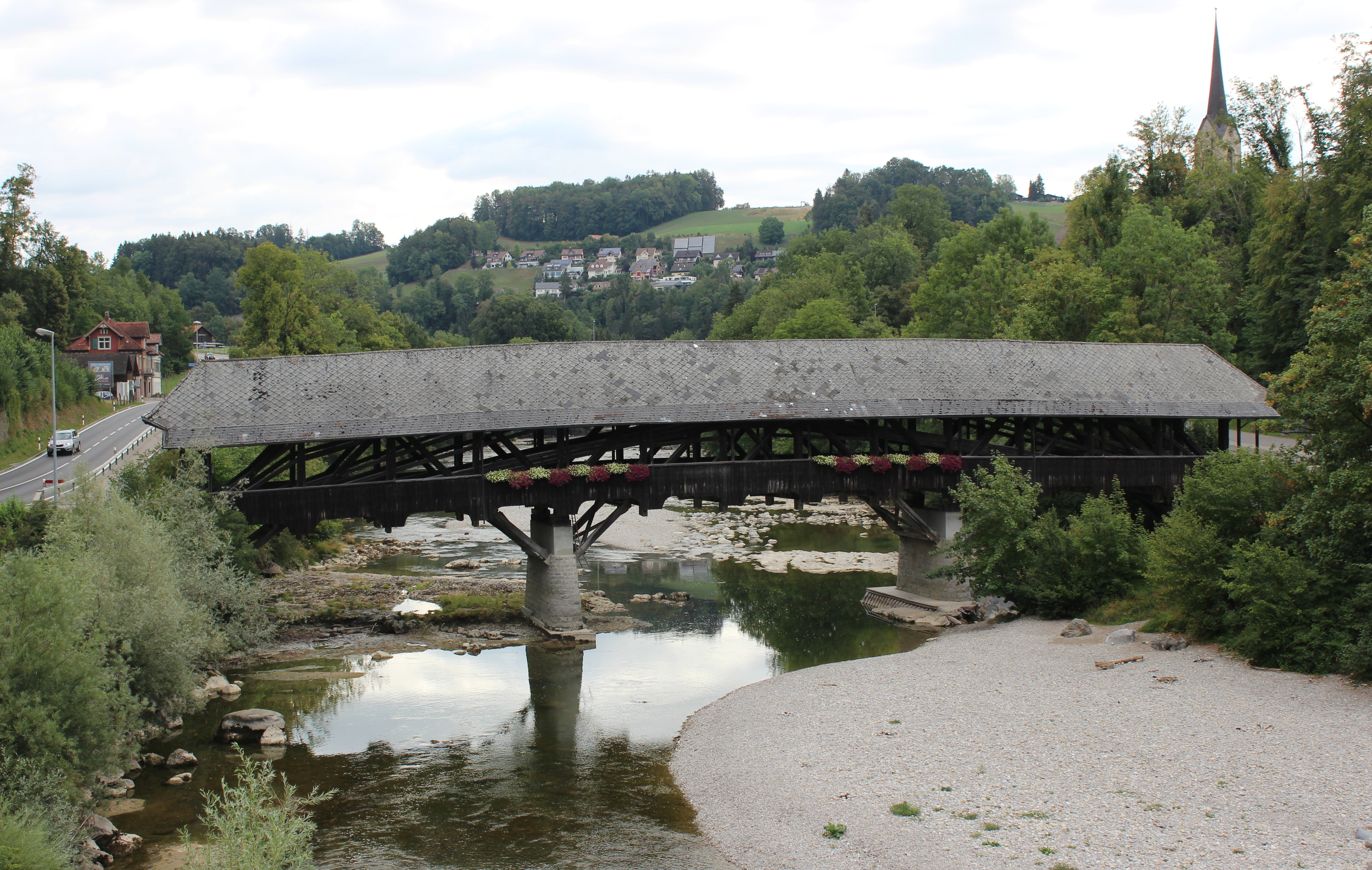
Wooden Thur bridge in Lütisburg

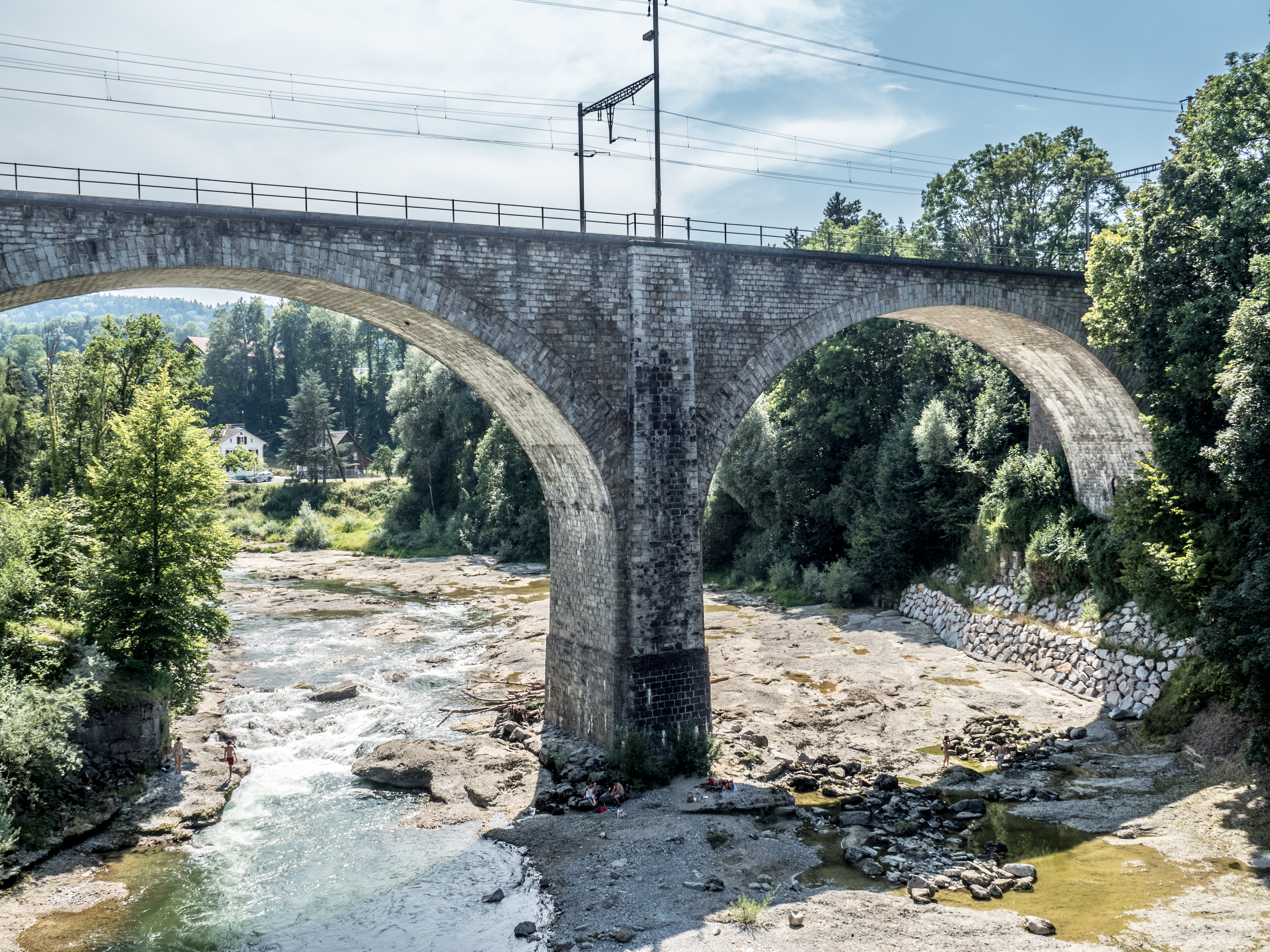
Railway bridge over the river between Wil SG and Schwarzenbach

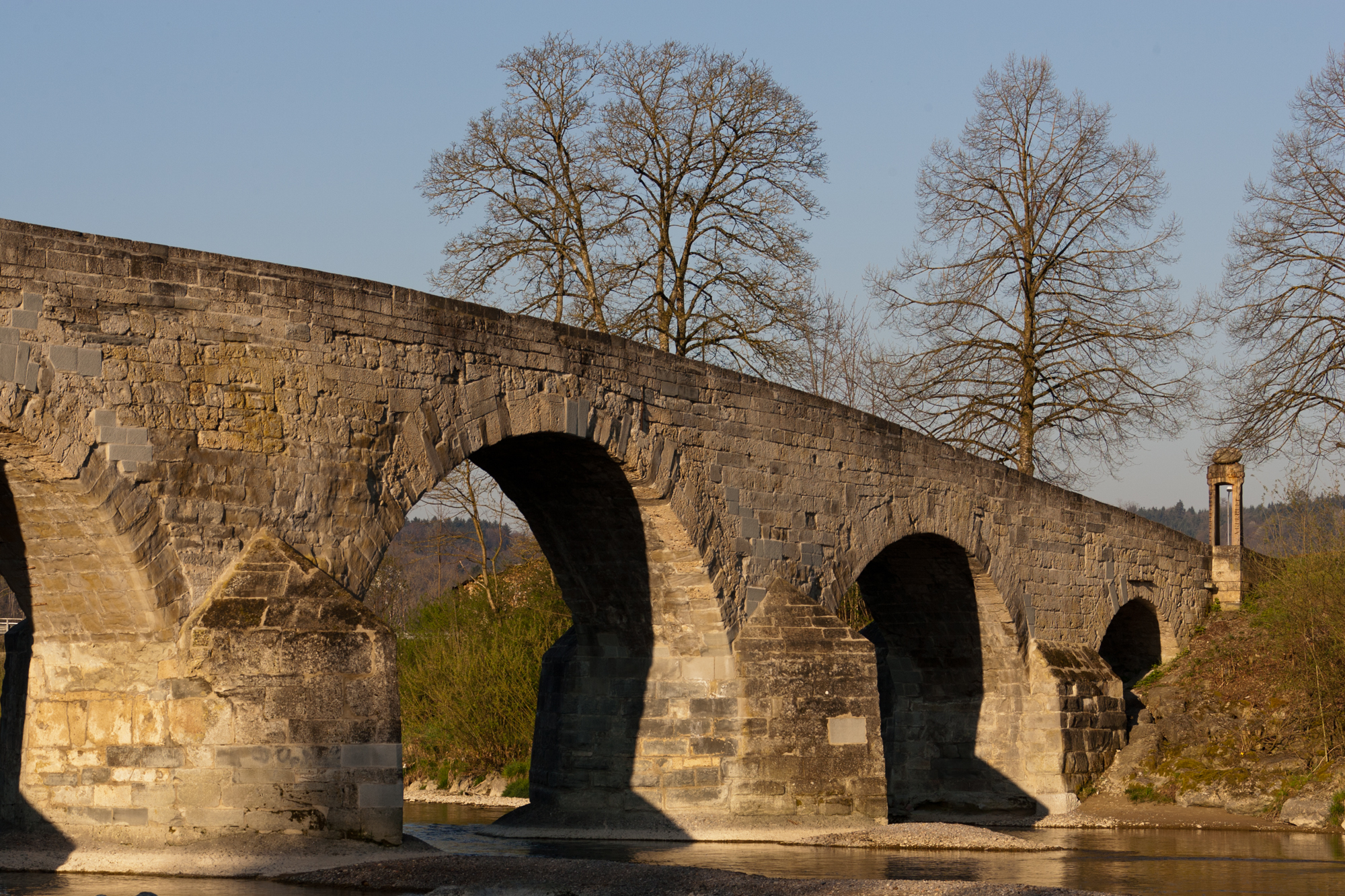
Historic Thur bridge in Bischofszell

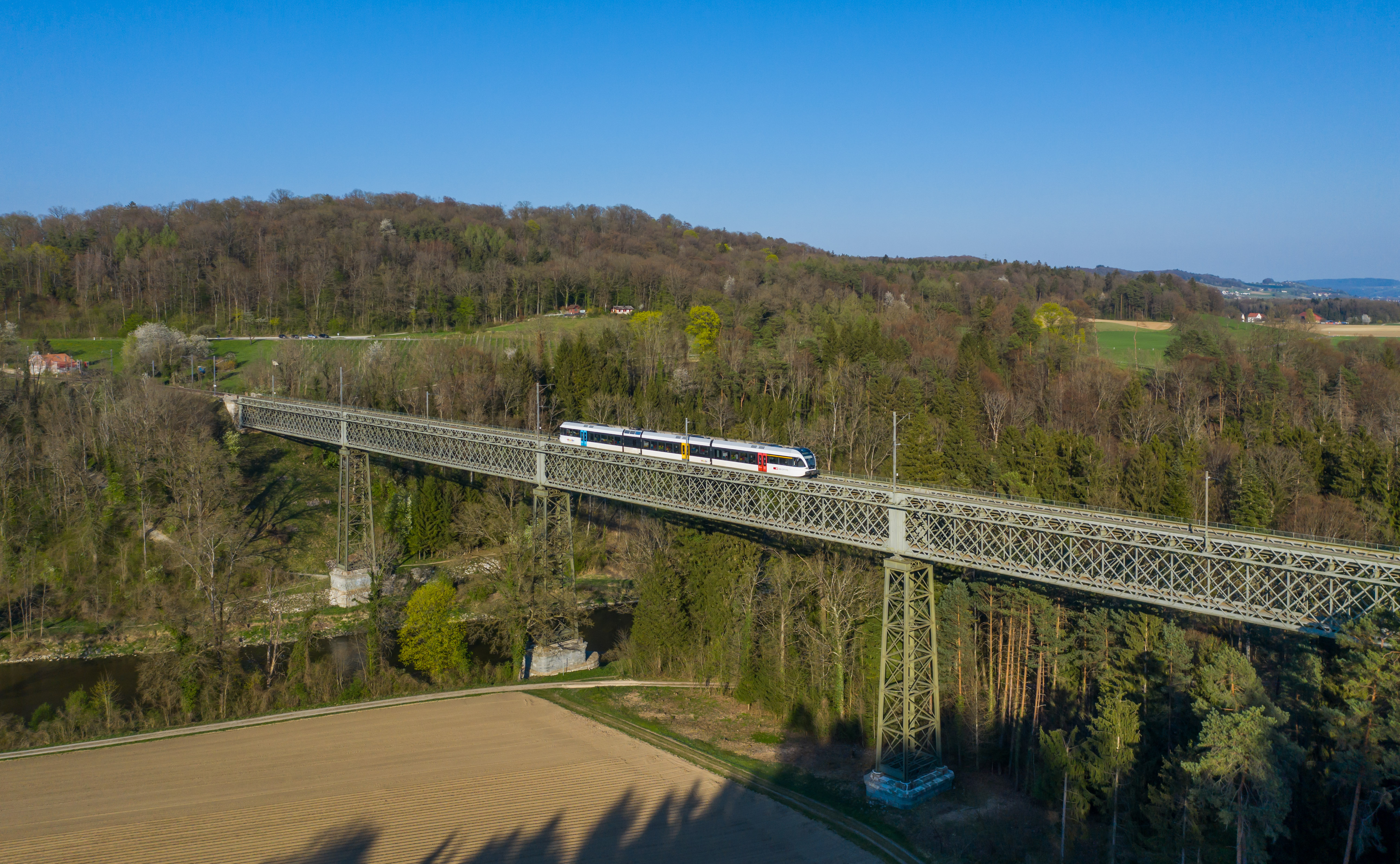
Railway bridge between Thalheim-Altikon and Ossingen

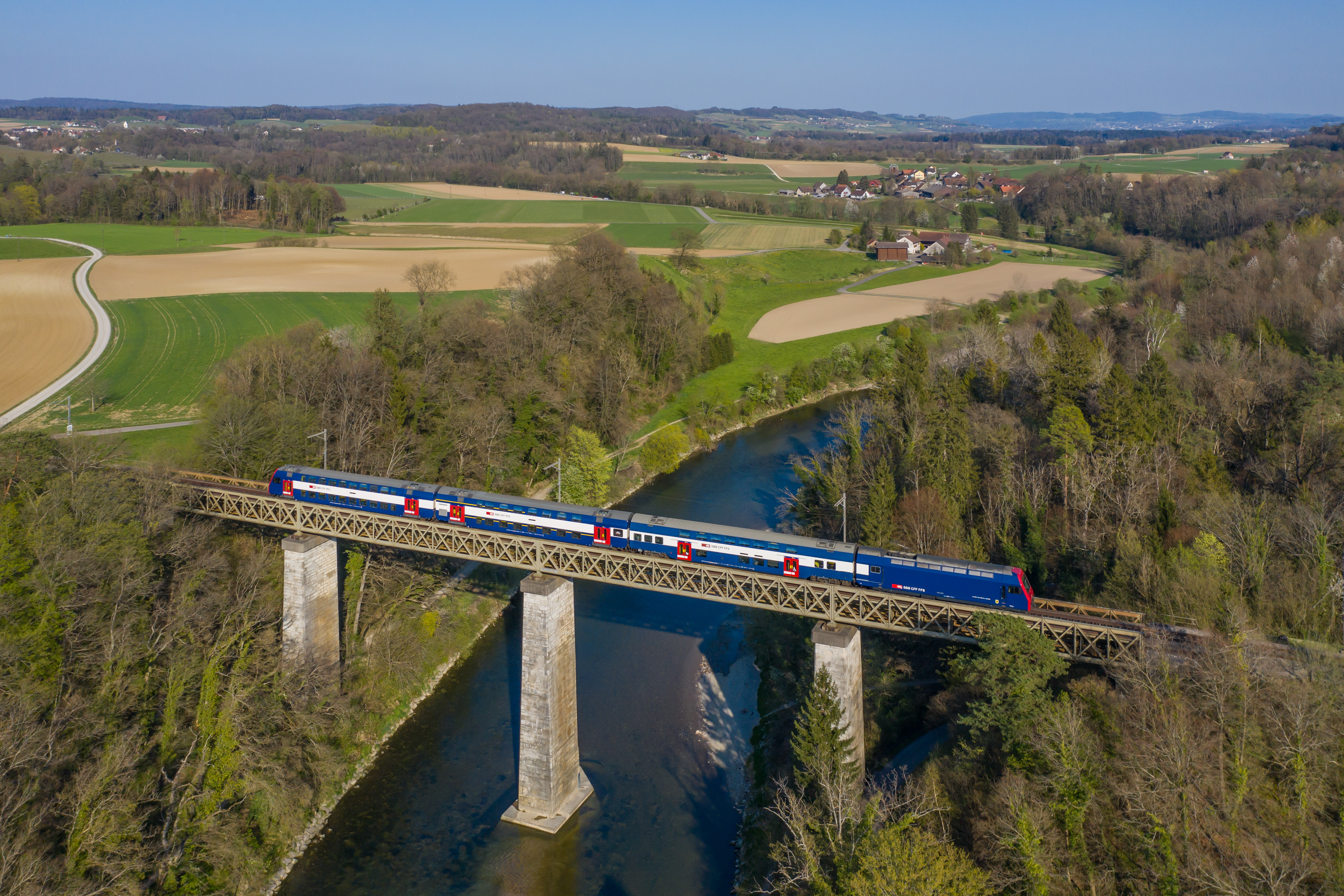
Railway bridge over the river near Andelfingen

The Thur (Swiss Standard German pronunciation: [ˈtuːr]) is a 135-kilometre-long (84 mi) river in north-eastern Switzerland and a tributary of the High Rhine (Hochrhein).

== Name ==
The name was first attested in 886 A.D. as Dura. In the 13th century, the spelling Turia appears, and in the 14th century Thûr, Tûr. The name has been interpreted as an Old European hydronym, from *durâ or *duriâ “river” from the Indo-European root *dhu “to run, to hurry”.

Turgowe, a village in the Duchy of Alamannia, was named after a body of water. The first mention of the village is slightly older than the earliest mention of the body of water. Around 745, it was cited in the village of Durgaugen. This led to the eventual naming of the canton as Thurgau.

== Course ==
The river's source is near Wildhaus in the south-east of the Toggenburg region in the canton of St. Gallen, south of Säntis mountain (Alpstein). Near Unterwasser, it forms two waterfalls. Subsequently, it flows mainly northward through the Toggenburg Valley. Near Lütisburg, it is joined by the Necker. Close to the town of Wil, it turns eastward and the Thur continues through the canton of Thurgau, which is named after the river. At Bischofszell, at the confluence with the Sitter, the Thur changes its direction and continues in a general westward direction, passing by Frauenfeld, the capital of Thurgau, where it is joined by the River Murg. The final 19 kilometres (12 mi) of the Thur is in the canton of Zürich. North of Flaach, it then flows into the River Rhine (High Rhine) near the border between the canton of Zürich and the southern part of the canton of Schaffhausen (Rüdlingen-Buchberg), just a short distance south of the border with Germany. The mouth of the Thur lies only a few kilometers north of the confluence of the Rhine and Töss.

== Tributaries ==
Tributaries are listed from source to mouth:

- Wildhauser Thur (near Unterwasser)
- Wissthur (near Stein)
- Luteren (near Neu St. Johann)
- Dietfurterbach (near Dietfurt)
- Necker (near Lütisburg)
- Gonzenbach (near Lütisburg)
- Uze (near Niederuzwil)
- Glatt (near Oberbüren)
- Sitter (near Bischofszell)
  - Schwendibach
  - Weissbach
  - Rotbach
  - Wattbach
    - Gstaldenbach
    - Buebenrütibach
  - Urnäsch
    - Wissebach
- Furtbach
- Giessen (near Amlikon-Bissegg)
  - Wisebach
    - Tobelbach
    - Mättlibach
- Kemme (near Pfyn)
  - Tosbach
  - Furtibach
- Seebach (near Warth-Weiningen)
- Murg
  - Lützelmurg
  - Lauche
- Tägelbach
- Ellikerbach
- Mederbach
  - Bruggbach
  - Abistbach

== Floods ==
The River Thur, undisturbed by any lake, from its source to its confluence with the Rhine, is a mountain stream that tends to rise sharply in water level under appropriate weather conditions. The biggest floods were in the years:

- Flood of 1664
- Flood of 1693: Jakob Vogel von Alten reported that a piece of land of incredible size was suddenly torn away from the rest right next to his house and sank into the Thur.
- Flood of July 29 and 30, 1789: This is considered the heaviest flood.
- June 1876: Long-lasting and heavy rainfall caused all rivers to overflow, causing huge damage. Slopes, roads, houses were washed away.
- May 13, 1999: The Thur River reached a historic flood level. The river flowed 1130 cubic meters of water per second.

== Thurweg ==
Thurweg (English: Thur path) is a 160-kilometer hiking trail that runs along the banks of the Thur river from Wildhaus to Rüdlingen.The main attractions are:

- Mount Säntis: The trail leads to the source of the Thur river on Mount Säntis, a scenic route in the Toggenburg district.
- Thur Valley and Zurich wine region: The trail leads through the plains of the Thur Valley and the Zurich wine region, where the Thur flows into the Rhine. In the wine-growing region of the canton of Zurich, the Thur shows its typical meanders up to the renatured Thur wetlands above the Rhine.
- Thurgau is a region known for its large number of cycling trails.
- Public transportation along the upper part of the river (Wil SG–Nesslau-Neu St. Johann) is provided by S-Bahn services of St. Gallen S-Bahn on the Wil–Ebnat-Kappel railway and upper section of the Bodensee–Toggenburg railway lines. The middle section of the river is followed by the Sulgen–Gossau railway line between Bischofszell Stadt and Sulgen, and the Thur Valley Railway line between Sulgen and Frauenfeld, which are operated by services of St. Gallen S-Bahn and Zürich S-Bahn. Besides, the river is followed by several bus routes, chiefly of PostBus Switzerland.

== See also ==
- Appenzell Alps
- Rivers in Switzerland
