= List of ski areas and resorts in Switzerland =

This is a list of ski areas and resorts in Switzerland.

A cohesive and complete list with updated information about snow condition, running lifts, open slopes, weather situation, current prices, season periods, and others are provided by search.ch and meteonews.ch.

There is a separate list for the cross-country skiing trails: List of cross-country skiing trails in Switzerland.

== Valais and Vaud ==
Name	Resorts	Base elevation (m)	Summit elevation (m)	Vertical drop (m)	Lifts (Note: Number of skilifts/chair-lifts/gondolas/cable cars, or total number.)	Ski pistes km	Website
Champex-Lac	Champex-Lac	1500	2000	500	4	20	
Matterhorn ski paradise	Zermatt	1600	3900	2300	103	313	
Les Portes du Soleil	Morgins, Champéry, Les Crosets	1000	2500	1500	114/78/12	650	
Verbier - Les quatre vallées	Verbier, Nendaz, Veysonnaz	1350	3330	1980	50/32/18	410	
Crans Montana	Crans, Barzettes, Montana, Aminona	1500	3000	1500	30/10/7	200	
Sierre-Anniviers	Grimentz, Zinal, Vercorin, St-Luc und Chandolin	1340	3025	1685	37/3/4	230	
Saas Fee	Saas Fee, Saas Balen, Saas Grund	1470	3600	2130	37/4/15	145	
Aletsch Arena	Belalp, Bettmeralp, Fiesch, Riederalp	1050	3118	2068	38/7/4	104	
Leysin	Leysin, Les Mosses, La Lecherette	1253	2200	947	19/7/3	100	
Les Diablerets	Les Diablerets	1200	2971	1771	27/10/8	80	
Leukerbad	Leukerbad	1411	2800	1389	9/1/3	60	
Lötschental	Wiler (Lötschen)	1375	3111	1736	2/2/1	33	
Anzère	Anzère	1500	2500	1000	8/2/1	40	
Villars-Gryon	Villars, Gryon	1300	2200	900	11	75	

== Bernese Oberland ==
Name	Resorts	Base elevation (m)	Summit elevation (m)	Vertical drop (m)	Lifts	Ski pistes km	Website
Gstaad Mountain Rides	Gstaad	1050	2971	1921	69	250	
Jungfrauregion	Mürren, Wengen, Grindelwald	796	2970	2174	19/14/6	213	
Adelboden-Lenk	Adelboden, Lenk, Frutigen	1068	2330	1262	36/7/8	205	
Alpenregion Meiringen-Hasliberg	Meiringen, Hasliberg	602	2433	1831	6/4/6	60	

== Central Switzerland ==
Name	Resorts	Base elevation (m)	Summit elevation (m)	Vertical drop (m)	Lifts	Ski pistes km	Website
Brunni-Alpthal	Brunni, Alpthal	1098	1500	402	5/0/1	20	
Engelberg Titlis	Engelberg	1050	3020	1970	14/14/14	82	
Gotthard Oberalp Arena	Andermatt, Hospental	1444	2963	1519	11/8/4	55	
Airolo-Pesciüm	Airolo-Pesciüm	1175	2250	1075	8	30	
Sörenberg	Sörenberg, Flühli	1166	2350	1184	17/2/3	50	
Hoch-Ybrig	Oberiberg, Unteriberg	900	1938	1038	6/4/1	50	

== Grisons ==
Name	Resorts	Base elevation (m)	Summit elevation (m)	Vertical drop (m)	Lifts	Ski pistes km	Website
Davos-Klosters	Davos, Klosters	1191	2844	1653	14/6/5	320	
Arosa Lenzerheide	Arosa, Lenzerheide, Valbella, Parpan, Churwalden	1230	2865	1635	16/18/7	225	
Engadin-St. Moritz	St. Moritz, Silvaplana, Sils Maria, Pontresina, Celerina, Zuoz	1768	3303	1535	56/29/16	350	
LAAX	Flims, Laax, Falera	1080	2970	1890	12/7/11	220	
Silvretta Arena	Samnaun, Ischgl (A)	1700	2900	1200	16/21/5	200	
Gotthard Oberalp Arena	Disentis, Sedrun, Dieni	1150	2903	1753	14/7/1	110	
Savognin	Savognin	1207	2713	1506	16/6/0	80	
Engadin-Scuol	Scuol	1250	2800	1550	3/6/1	80	
Brigels	Brigels, Waltensburg, Andiast	1100	2418	1318	6/3/0	75	
Splügen	Splügen	1480	2215	735	4/2/2	30	
Vals3000	Vals	1250	2865	1615	3/0/1	25	
Minschuns	Val Müstair	1670	2700	1030	4	25	

== Eastern Switzerland ==
Name	Resorts	Base elevation (m)	Summit elevation (m)	Vertical drop (m)	Lifts	Ski pistes km	Website
Arvenbüel	Amden	1228	1352	124	4	12	
Degersheim (Fuchsacker)	Degersheim	815	1034	219	2	3	
Flumserberg	Flumserberg, Unterterzen	1000	2222	1222	5/8/4	65	
Toggenburg	Wildhaus, Unterwasser, Alt St. Johann	900	2262	1362	12/6/2	60	
Pizol	Bad Ragaz, Wangs	900	2226	1326	5/3/4	40	
Braunwald	Braunwald	1256	1905	649	9	32	

== See also ==
- Swiss Alps
- List of mountains of Switzerland accessible by public transport
- Lists of tourist attractions in Switzerland
