= List of cross-country skiing trails in Switzerland =

The following list contains the cross-country skiing trails in Switzerland. 160 cross-country ski run organizations, united under the umbrella organizations Loipen Schweiz (German- and Italian-speaking Switzerland) and Romandie Ski de Fond (French-speaking Switzerland), together maintain a cross-country ski trail network of around 5500 km.

The trail reports with the current snow conditions are available on the websites of Switzerland Tourism and Bergfex.

| Trail | Place / Region | Canton | Elevation (m above sea level) | Classic (km) | Skating (km) | Night trail (km) | Dog trail (km) |
|---|---|---|---|---|---|---|---|
| Ardez | Ardez | GR | 1400–1500 | 3 | 3 | 1,5 | – |
| Arosa | Arosa | GR | 1606–1980 | 28,5 | 22,5 | 2 | – |
| Avers | Avers | GR | 2000 | 8 | 3 | – | – |
| Bergün-Filisur | Bergün-Filisur | GR | 957–1440 | 21 | 21 | 1,5 | – |
| Bever | Bever | GR | 1700 | 13 | 13 | – | – |
| Bivio/Surses | Bivio | GR | 1700–1800 | 12 | 12 | 1 | – |
| Brambrüesch | Brambrüesch | GR | 1700–1800 | 3,2 | 3,2 | – | – |
| Brigels/Surselva | Breil | GR | 1354 | 9,1 | 9,1 | 1,9 | – |
| Castrisch | Castrisch | GR | 750 | 6,2 | 6,2 | 1 | – |
| Castrisch Ladir | Castrisch | GR | 1360 | 1 | 3,2 | 3 | |
| Castrisch Siat | Castrisch | GR | 1320 | 1 | | | |
| Celerina | Celerina | GR | 1730 | 17 | 17 | – | – |
| Davos | Davos | GR | 1480–1860 | 76 | 56 | 2,5 | 18,5 |
| Engadin | Engadin | GR | 1450–1800 | 247 | 235 | 7 | 15 |
| Flims-Bargis-Trin | Flims-Trin | GR | 800–1600 | 47,5 | 47,5 | 4 | – |
| Ftan | Ftan | GR | 1650–1700 | 8,5 | 8,5 | 2 | – |
| Klosters | Klosters | GR | 950–1400 | 35 | 35 | 3 | 12 |
| La Punt | La Punt Chamues-ch | GR | 1680 | 5 | 5 | – | – |
| Lenz - Lenzerheide - Parpan | Lenz-Lenzerheide-Parpan | GR | 1360–1560 | 56 | 56 | 4 | – |
| Madulain | Madulain | GR | 1680 | 6 | 6 | – | 5,5 |
| Maloja | Maloja | GR | 1815 | 23 | 23 | – | – |
| Obersaxen Mundaun | Obersaxen | GR | 1070 | 9,3 | 9,3 | 1 | – |
| Pontresina | Pontresina | GR | 1770–2200 | 57 | 57 | 1 | – |
| Safien/Thalkirch | Safien/Thalkirch | GR | 1700–1800 | 7 | 7 | – | – |
| Sagogn | Sagogn | GR | 770 | 15,5 | 15,5 | 2,5 | 1 |
| Samedan | Samedan | GR | 1700 | 13 | 13 | – | – |
| San Bernardino | San Bernardino | GR | 1608 | 31 | 31 | 2 | 2 |
| S-chanf | S-chanf | GR | 1665 | 8 | 8 | – | 2 |
| Scuol - Martina (Engadin) | Scuol | GR | 1100–1200 | 28 | 28 | 2 | – |
| Scuol Motta Naluns (Engadin) | Scuol | GR | 2200–2300 | 2,5 | 2,5 | – | – |
| Sedrun | Sedrun | GR | 1400 | 15 | 15 | 2 | – |
| Sils/Engadin | Sils im Engadin | GR | 1799 | 30 | 30 | – | – |
| Silvaplana | Silvaplana | GR | 1790 | 18 | 18 | – | – |
| Splügen/Rheinwald | Splügen | GR | 1457–1570 | 38 | 38 | – | – |
| St. Moritz | St. Moritz | GR | 1780 | 15 | 15 | 1,5 | – |
| Surses/Savognin | Savognin | GR | 1200–1700 | 33 | 33 | 3 | – |
| Tarasp | Tarasp | GR | 1350–1550 | 5,5 | 3,5 | – | – |
| Trin-Flims | Trin-Flims | GR | 800–1100 | 36 | 36 | 4 | – |
| Surselva (Disentis - Trun) | Surselva | GR | 860–1190 | 31 | 31 | 5,8 | – |
| Val Lumnezia | Val Lumnezia | GR | 1122–1240 | 6,5 | 6,5 | – | – |
| Val Müstair | Val Müstair | GR | 1415–2160 | 28 | 28 | – | – |
| Zernez/Susch/Lavin | Zernez/Susch/Lavin | GR | 1450 | 40 | 40 | 3,5 | – |
| Zuoz | Zuoz | GR | 1670 | 9 | 9 | – | – |
| Bedretto | Bedretto | TI | 1400 | 6,5 | 6,5 | – | – |
| Campra | Campra | TI | 1420 | 30 | 30 | 2 | – |
| San Bernardino | San Bernardino | TI | 1608 | 31 | 31 | 2 | 2 |
| Alt St.Johann/Unterwasser/Wildhaus | Alt St. Johann/Unterwasser/Wildhaus | SG | 900–1560 | 41 | 41 | 5 | 2 |
| Amden–Arvenbüel | Amden | SG | 1265 | 7,5 | 3 | – | – |
| Bäretswil | Bäretswil | ZH | 700–800 | 12 | 12 | – | – |
| Degersheim | Degersheim | SG | 850–950 | 17 | 17 | 2 | – |
| Thurtal-Loipe | Ebnat-Kappel/Wattwil | SG | 650 | 12 | 12 | – | – |
| Hemberg-Scherb Panorama-Loipe | Hemberg | SG | 950–1150 | 17 | 10 | – | – |
| Elm | Elm | GL | 950 | 7 | 7 | 1,2 | – |
| Engi/Matt | Engi/Matt | GL | 810 | 7 | 7 | – | – |
| Ennetbühl/Rietbad | Nesslau | SG | 920 | 8 | 8 | – | – |
| First-Kyburg | Kyburg | ZH | 680 | 7 | 7 | – | – |
| Flumserberg | Flumserberg | SG | 1400–1800 | 5 | 15 | – | 2 |
| Gais | Gais | AR | 900 | 30 | 30 | 3 | |
| Panoramaloipe Gibswil | Gibswil | ZH | 900 | 34 | 28 | 4 | – |
| Glarnerland «Tödi-Tritt» | Kanton Glarus | GL | 520–660 | 22 | 22 | 2 | – |
| Gonten | Gonten | AI | 900 | 35 | 20 | – | – |
| Heiden–Bodensee | Heiden–Bodensee | AR | 800–1100 | 12 | 7 | 1,6 | – |
| Hittnau | Hittnau | ZH | 800 | 15 | 5,8 | – | – |
| Kirchberg SG | Kirchberg SG | SG | 750–800 | 13 | 3 | 3 | |
| Pfannenstiel-Guldenen-Hombrechtikon | Pfannenstiel/Hombrechtikon | ZH | 520–850 | 30 | 30 | | – |
| Ricken | Ricken | SG | 800–1200 | 23 | 14,5 | 2 | – |
| Schaffhausen/Randen/Eschheimertal | Schaffhausen | SH | 780–900 | 20 | 13 | – | |
| Schauenberg | Elgg | ZH | 750–800 | 7 | 7 | 3 | – |
| Schönengrund | Schönengrund | AR | 850 | 15 | 15 | 2 | – |
| Seerücken/Salen/Reutenen | Seerücken | TG | 700 | 10 | 10 | – | – |
| Speicher/Wies | Speicher | AR | 900 | 3 | 3 | – | – |
| St. Margrethenberg | St. Margrethenberg | SG | 1200–1500 | 22 | 27 | – | 1 |
| Stadt St. Gallen | St. Gallen | SG | 680–1005 | 8,5 | 8,5 | 1,2 | – |
| Urnäsch | Urnäsch | SG | 830–900 | 5 | 5 | 1 | – |
| Urnerboden/Gulispur | Urnerboden | GL | 1400 | 10 | 10 | – | – |
| Vättis | Vättis | SG | 950–1150 | 16 | 16 | 1,5 | – |
| Waldkirch | Waldkirch | SG | 800 | 15 | 5 | 3 | – |
| Weisslingen/Lendikon | Weisslingen | ZH | 700 | 10 | 10 | – | – |
| Wellenberg/Lustdorf | Lustdorf | TG | 680 | 5 | 5 | – | – |
| Andermatt | Andermatt | UR | 1500 | 28 | 28 | 2 | – |
| Eigenthal | Eigental | LU | 960–1100 | 16 | 17 | 3 | 2 |
| Einsiedeln Schwedentritt | Einsiedeln | SZ | 860–950 | 22 | 22 | – | – |
| Einsiedeln Gross | Einsiedeln | SZ | 900–1000 | 5 | 5 | – | – |
| Einsiedeln/Bolzberg-Trachslau | Einsiedeln | SZ | 880–950 | 27 | 27 | 4 | – |
| Engelberg Talloipe | Engelberg | OW | 1000–1100 | 22 | 22 | 1,6 | – |
| Engelberg Gerschnialp | Engelberg | OW | 1260 | 8 | 8 | – | – |
| Escholzmatt-Marbach-Bumbach | Escholzmatt-Marbach | LU | 850–920 | 50 | 50 | 6 | – |
| Finsterwald | Entlebuch | LU | 1050 | 19 | 19 | 1,8 | – |
| Langis-Glaubenberg | Glaubenberg | OW | 1450 | 25 | 25 | – | – |
| Melchsee-Frutt | Melchsee-Frutt | NW | 1920–1974 | 15 | 15 | – | – |
| Menzingen | Menzingen | ZG | 830 | 5 | 5 | – | – |
| Oberberg/Ibergeregg | Ibergeregg | SZ | 1230 | 4 | 4 | 3 | – |
| Rigi Kaltbad | Rigi | SZ | 1440–1650 | 14 | – | – | – |
| Römerswil/Herlisberg | Römerswil/Herlisberg | LU | 750 | 10 | 10 | – | – |
| Finnenloipe Rothenthurm | Rothenthurm | SZ | 930 | 25 | 25 | 3 | – |
| Salwideli | Sörenberg | LU | 1350–1500 | 27 | 27 | – | – |
| Schüpfheim | Schüpfheim | LU | 750–820 | 6 | 6 | – | – |
| Sörenberg Dorf | Sörenberg | LU | 1170 | 8 | 8 | – | – |
| Stoos | Stoos | SZ | 1300 | 12,6 | 12,6 | | |
| Morschach | Morschach | SZ | 800 | 1,6 | 1,6 | 1,6 | |
| Studen | Studen | SZ | 900 | 27 | 27 | – | – |
| Unterägeri | Unterägeri | SZ | 750–850 | 10 | 18 | – | |
| Unterschächen | Unterschächen | UR | 1000 | 6 | 6 | 5 | – |
| Zugerberg | Zugerberg | ZG | 925–1045 | 11,5 | 15,5 | 1,1 | – |
| Auenstein/Loipe Staffelegg | Auenstein | AG | 600–700 | 10 | 10 | | |
| Kalthof-Wiliberg | Wiliberg | AG | 645–684 | 6,7 | 6,7 | – | |
| Langenbruck/Bärenwil | Langenbruck | BL | 810 | 6 | 6 | 1,7 | – |
| Leutwil | Leutwil | AG | 640 | 3 | 3 | 3 | – |
| Lindenberg | Lindenberg | AG | 776–861 | 21 | 21 | 4,2 | – |
| Rickenbach LU | Rickenbach LU | LU | 680–780 | 8 | 8 | 3 | – |
| Waldweid/Wasserfallen | Reigoldswil | BL | 980–1040 | 4 | 4 | – | – |
| Weissenstein/Solothurn | Weissenstein | SO | 1260 | 4 | 4 | – | – |
| Adelboden | Adelboden | BE | 1200–1400 | 13 | 13 | 2 | – |
| Engstligenalp | Adelboden | BE | 1900–2000 | 8 | 8 | – | – |
| Aeschi/Suldtal | Aeschi/Suldtal | BE | 860–1260 | 35 | 32 | 4 | – |
| Arnisäge/Grosshöchstetten | Arni/Grosshöchstetten | BE | 800 | 7 | 7 | 2 | – |
| Beatenberg | Beatenberg | BE | 1300 | 18 | 18 | – | – |
| Charmey-Im Fang-Jaun | Charmey-Jaun | FR | 870–1050 | 20 | 20 | 4 | – |
| Diemtigtal-Grimmialp | Diemtigtal | BE | 1000–1300 | 22 | 22 | – | – |
| Eriz | Eriz | BE | 980–1040 | 10 | 12 | – | – |
| Gadmen | Gadmen | BE | 1200 | 15 | 15 | 7 | – |
| Gantrisch | Gantrisch | BE | 1500 | 45 | 45 | 2 | – |
| Grindelwald | Grindelwald | BE | 950 | 9 | 10,5 | – | 4 |
| Gstaad-Saanenland | Gstaad | BE | 1000–1400 | 41 | 41 | 2 | 3 |
| Glacier 3000 (Sommerloipe) | Les Diablerets | BE | 3000 | 6 | 6 | – | – |
| Habkern-Lombachalp | Habkern | BE | 1600 | 12 | 12 | – | – |
| Heimenschwand | Buchholterberg | BE | 930–1030 | 25 | 12 | 2,5 | – |
| Herzogenbuchsee/Oschwand | Herzogenbuchsee | BE | 500–660 | 5 | 5 | – | – |
| Jaunpass/Boltigen | Jaunpass/Boltigen | BE | 1500 | 16 | 16 | 2 | – |
| Kandersteg | Kandersteg | BE | 1176 | 55 | 52 | 6 | – |
| Sunnbüel | Kandersteg | BE | 1900 | 8 | 8 | – | – |
| Kiental/Reichenbach | Reichenbach | BE | 900–1000 | 5 | 5 | – | – |
| Langnau/Trub | Langnau im Emmental/Trub | BE | 700–1100 | 20 | 20 | 5 | – |
| Lauterbrunnen | Lauterbrunnen | BE | 800 | 12 | 12 | – | – |
| Lenk im Simmental | Lenk | BE | 1000–1800 | 36 | 36 | – | – |
| Linden | Linden | BE | 920 | 9,5 | 9,5 | – | – |
| Magglingen | Magglingen | BE | 940–1070 | 15 | 15 | 2 | – |
| Oberwil/Simmental | Oberwil im Simmental | BE | 1150 | 4,5 | 4,5 | 4,5 | – |
| Schwanden/Sigriswil/Justistal | Schwanden bei Brienz/Sigriswil | BE | 1200–1400 | 25 | 25 | 1,5 | – |
| St. Stephan | St. Stephan | BE | 1000 | 13 | 1 | – | – |
| Wasen i.E./Kurzenei | Sumiswald | BE | 840–940 | 5 | 4 | – | – |
| Zweisimmen/Sparenmoos | Zweisimmen | BE | 1639 | 37 | 37 | – | – |
| Goms | Goms | VS | 1250–1560 | 94,5 | 94,5 | 4,5 | 4 |
| Leukerbad | Leukerbad | VS | 1400 | 6 | 6 | – | – |
| Gemmi | Leukerbad | VS | 2200 | 15 | 15 | – | – |
| Loipe Matterhorn Täsch-Randa | Täsch-Randa | VS | 1400 | 12 | 12 | – | – |
| Lötschental | Lötschental | VS | 1200–1780 | 24 | 24 | 6 | – |
| Moosalp | Moosalp | VS | 1500–2000 | 12 | 12 | – | – |
| Saastal-Loipe | Saastal | VS | 1471–1871 | 24 | 22 | – | – |
| Simplon | Simplonpass | VS | 1980–2005 | 5 | 5 | – | – |
| Bugnenets/Savagnières | Saint-Imier | BE | 1030–1250 | 24 | 24 | – | – |
| Creux du Van/Couvet NE | Creux du Van | NE | 1100–1350 | 36 | 36 | – | – |
| L’Auberson | L'Auberson | VS | 1060–1160 | 25 | 25 | – | 2 |
| La Brévine | La Brévine | NE | 1046–1150 | 30 | 30 | 3 | – |
| La Côte-aux-Fées NE | La Côte-aux-Fées | NE | 1040–1161 | 18 | 18 | – | |
| La Sagne | La Sagne | NE | 1000–1330 | 27 | 27 | – | – |
| La Thomasette/Le Brassus | Le Brassus | VS | 1020–1300 | 41 | 41 | – | – |
| La Vue des Alpes/Tête de Ran | Tête de Ran | NE | 1130–1360 | 54 | 54 | 4 | – |
| Les Arêtes/Les Foulets/La Chaux-de-Fonds | La Chaux-de-Fonds | NE | 1030–1270 | 23 | 23 | – | – |
| Les Bioux | L'Abbaye | VS | 1006–1433 | 13 | 9 | – | – |
| Les Breuleux/Freiberge | Les Breuleux | JU | 1000–1050 | 37,5 | 37,5 | 1,5 | – |
| Les Cernets/Les Verrières | Les Verrières | NE | 1150–1300 | 50 | 50 | 2 | – |
| Les Charbonnières/Le Lieu VD | Le Lieu | VS | 1000–1372 | 34 | 34 | – | – |
| Les Genevez/Freiberge | Les Genevez | JU | 950–1050 | 16 | 16 | – | – |
| Les Ponts-de-Martel-La Tourne | Les Ponts-de-Martel-La Tourne | NE | 1000–1200 | 33 | 33 | – | – |
| Les Prés-d’Orvin/Chasseral | Chasseral | BE | 1020–1540 | 50 | 50 | 2 | – |
| Les Rasses/Sainte-Croix | Sainte-Croix VD | VS | 1175–1300 | 65 | 65 | 4 | 8 |
| Marchairuz | Col du Marchairuz | VS | 1300–1447 | 42 | 42 | – | – |
| Mollendruz | Col du Mollendruz | VS | 1184–1502 | 45 | 45 | – | – |
| Mont Soleil/Mont Crosin | Mont Soleil | BE | 1000–1250 | 30 | 30 | – | – |
| Nods/Chasseral | Nods/Chasseral | BE | 970–1200 | 11 | 11 | – | – |
| Pouillerel/La Chaux-de-Fonds | La Chaux-de-Fonds | NE | 1030–1270 | 22 | 22 | – | – |
| Saignelégier/Freiberge | Saignelégier | JU | 950–1050 | 49 | 49 | 1,5 | – |
| Saint-Cergue-La Givrine-La Cure | Saint-Cergue | VS | 1050–1350 | 35 | 35 | – | 5 |
| Sommartel/Le Locle | Le Locle | NE | 1000–1330 | 37 | 37 | – | – |
| Saint-George | Saint-George | VS | 950–1158 | 20 | 20 | 1,5 | – |
| Champéry | Champéry | VS | 1050–1200 | 5 | 5 | 3 | – |
| Champex-Lac | Champex-Lac | VS | 1340–1500 | 11 | 11 | – | – |
| Crans-Montana – Glacier Plaine Morte | Crans-Montana | VS | 2800–3000 | 10 | 10 | – | – |
| Crans-Montana | Crans-Montana | VS | 1500–3000 | 15 | 15 | – | – |
| Evolène-Les Haudères/Arolla | Evolène-Les Haudères/Arolla | VS | 1370–2000 | 60 | 60 | 2 | 3,5 |
| La Fouly/Val Ferret | La Fouly | VS | 1540–1670 | 10 | 10 | – | – |
| Morgins | Morgins | VS | 1400–1700 | 20 | 16 | – | – |
| Ovronnaz–Mayens de Chamoson | Ovronnaz | VS | 1360–1500 | 20 | 15 | – | – |
| Verbier/Val de Bagnes VS | Verbier | VS | 900–2200 | 15 | 15 | – | – |
| Froideville VD | Froideville VD | VS | 800–870 | 12 | 11 | – | – |
| Gibloux FR | Gibloux FR | FR | 900–1000 | 23 | 23 | – | – |
| Le Crêt/Les Paccots | Les Paccots | FR | 870–1350 | 16 | 16 | 2 | – |
| Les Mosses/Pays d'Enhaut | Les Mosses | FR | 1400–1650 | 42 | 42 | 1 | – |
| Les Plans-sur-Bex | Bex | VS | 1066–1116 | 10 | 10 | 2,5 | – |
| Les Tenasses/Les Pléiades | Les Pléiades | VS | 1150–1207 | 22 | 22 | 2 | – |
| Leysin | Leysin | VS | 1250–1900 | 7 | 7 | – | – |
| Villars/Gryon | Villars-sur-Ollon/Gryon | VS | 1250–1800 | 44 | 44 | – | – |
