= Finnenloipe Rothenthurm =

Coordinates: 47.1072443°N 8.6721683°E

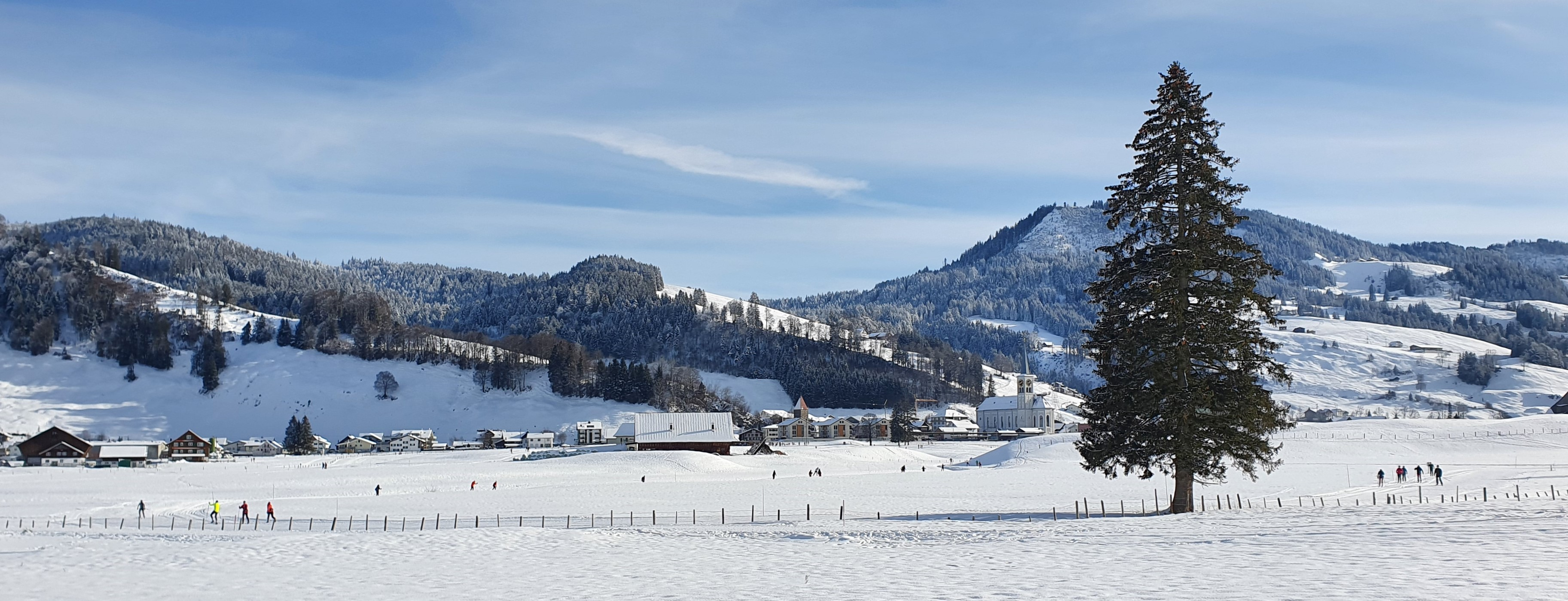
The Finnenloipe with Rothenthurm in the background

The Finnenloipe Rothenthurm is a cross-country skiing trail in the high valley of Rothenthurm, canton of Schwyz, Switzerland.

== Description ==
The trail is groomed for both skating and classic style. It begins at Rothenthurm railway station and leads through the Nordic-looking Rothenthurmer Hochmoor (lit. 'Rothenthurm raised bog') — hence the name Finnenloipe (English: cross-country skiing trail of the Finns). It is the largest contiguous raised bog area in Switzerland. Several times, the trail passes the Biber, one of the last freely meandering rivers in the Swiss Prealps.

The entire circuit is 20 kilometres (12 mi), but can be shortened to 7 km (4.3 mi), 11 km (6.8 mi) or 15 km (9.3 mi). In addition, there is a 3 km (1.9 mi) long night trail that is illuminated in the evening.

The trail is maintained by the Finnenloipe Rothenthurm association, which was founded on October 29, 1977.

== See also ==
- List of cross-country skiing trails in Switzerland
