= Thur waterfalls =

Two cascades on the upper part of the Thur river in Switzerland

- German: Thurfälle
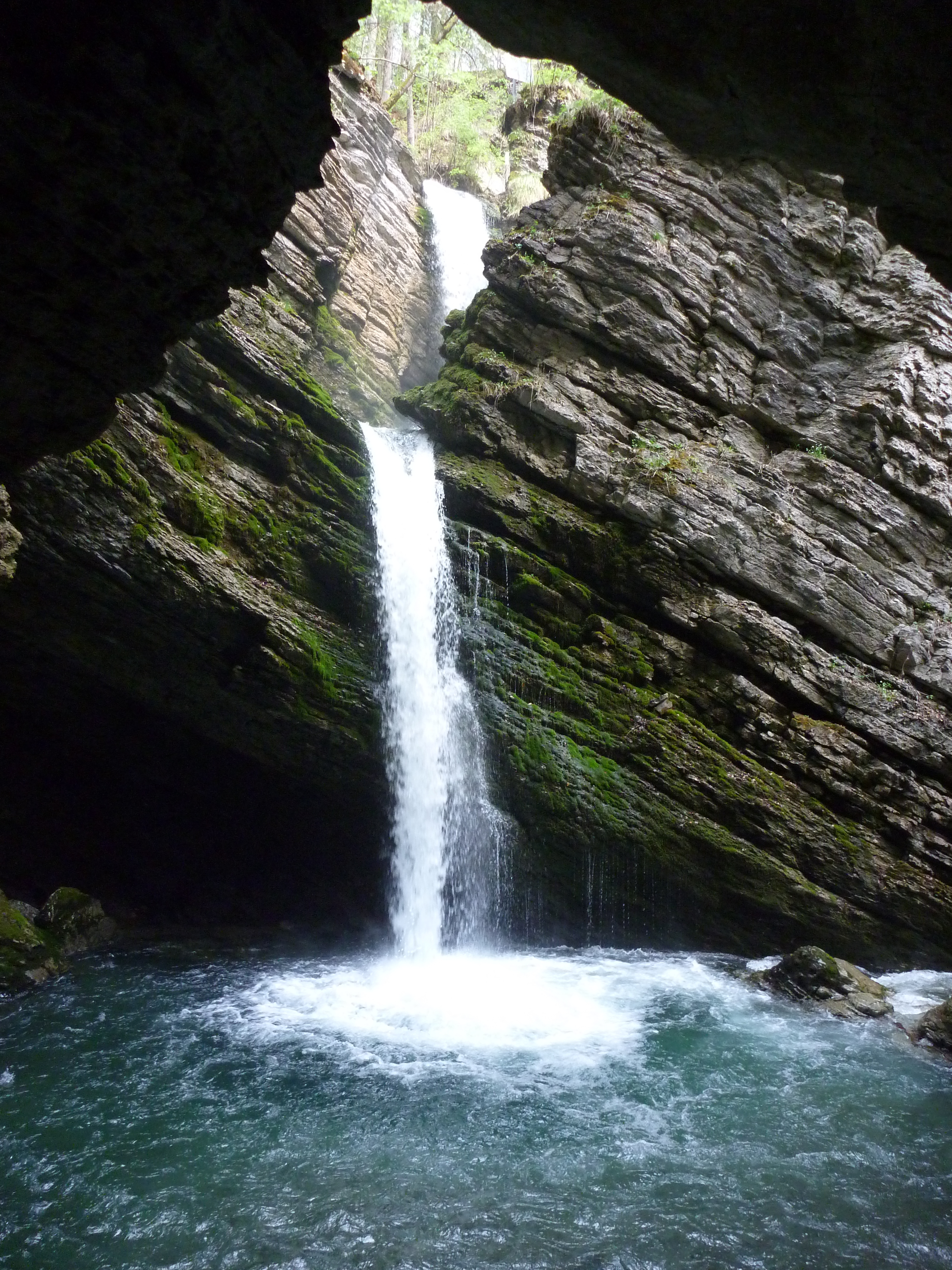
- The lower of the two falls

- Location within Switzerland Location within Canton of St. Gallen
- Location: Wildhaus-Alt St. Johann; Canton of St. Gallen; Switzerland
- Coordinates: 47°12′8.32″N 9°18′42.38″E
- Total height: 23 m (75 ft)
- Number of drops: 2
- Watercourse: Thur

The Thur waterfalls (German: Thurwasserfälle) are two cascades located on the upper part of the river Thur, approximately ten minutes walking distance from the village square of Unterwasser in the Toggenburg region of the canton of St. Gallen, Switzerland.

== Description ==
The water cascades down from steep rock faces, and on highest point drops from 23 metres (75 ft). The road along the waterfalls was developed in 1927 and includes three observation decks.

== Gallery ==
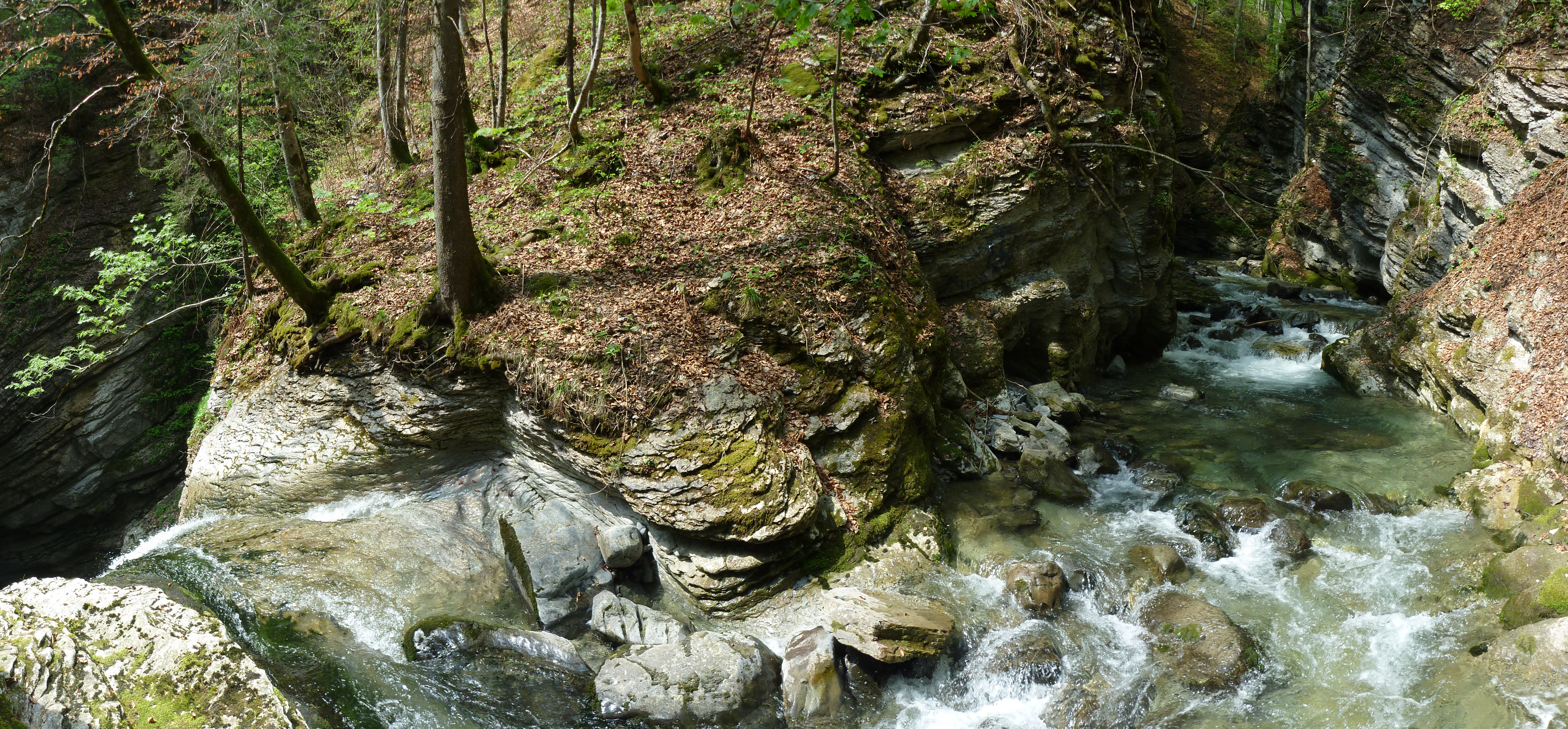
Thur above waterfalls

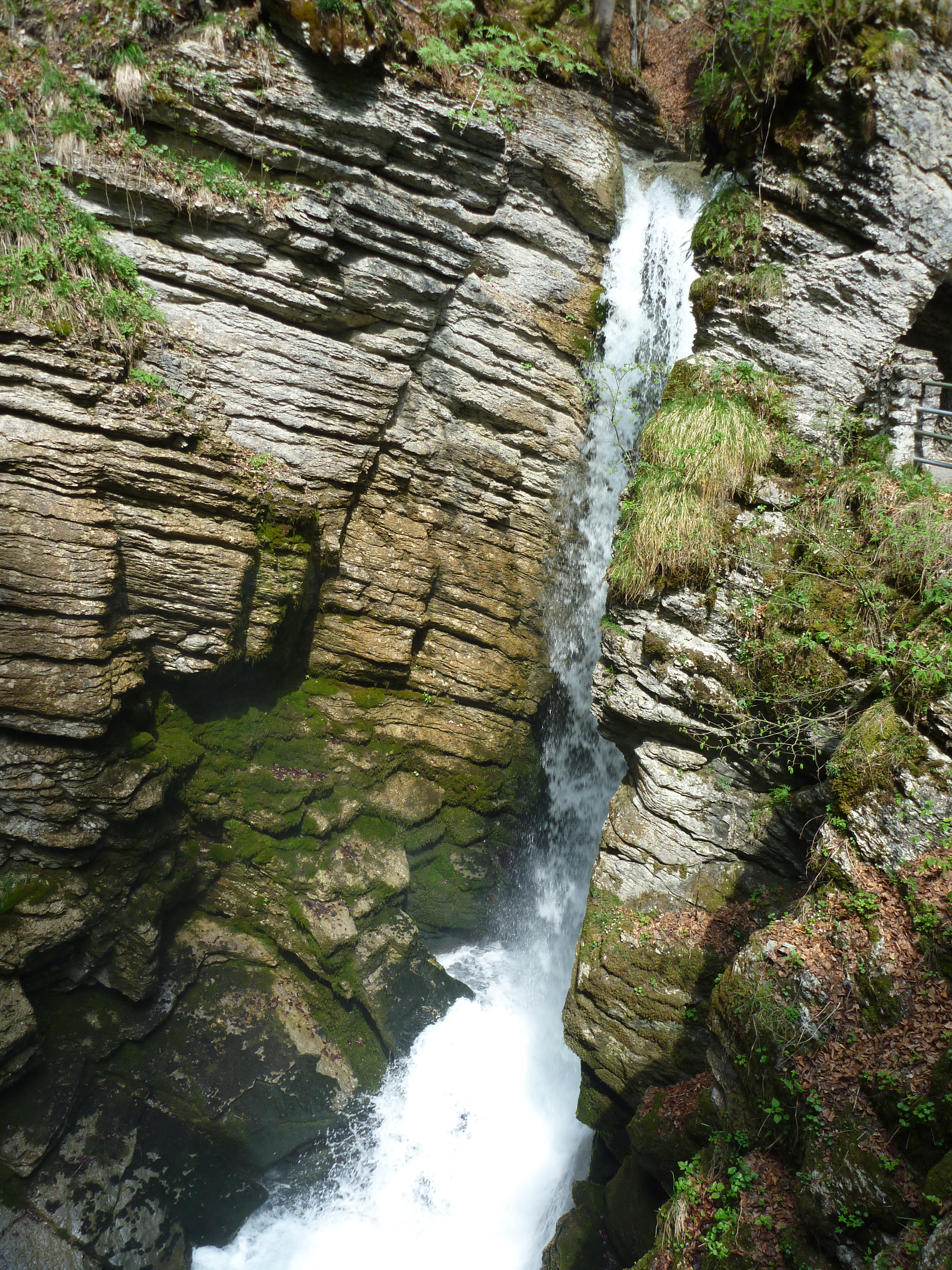
The upper waterfall

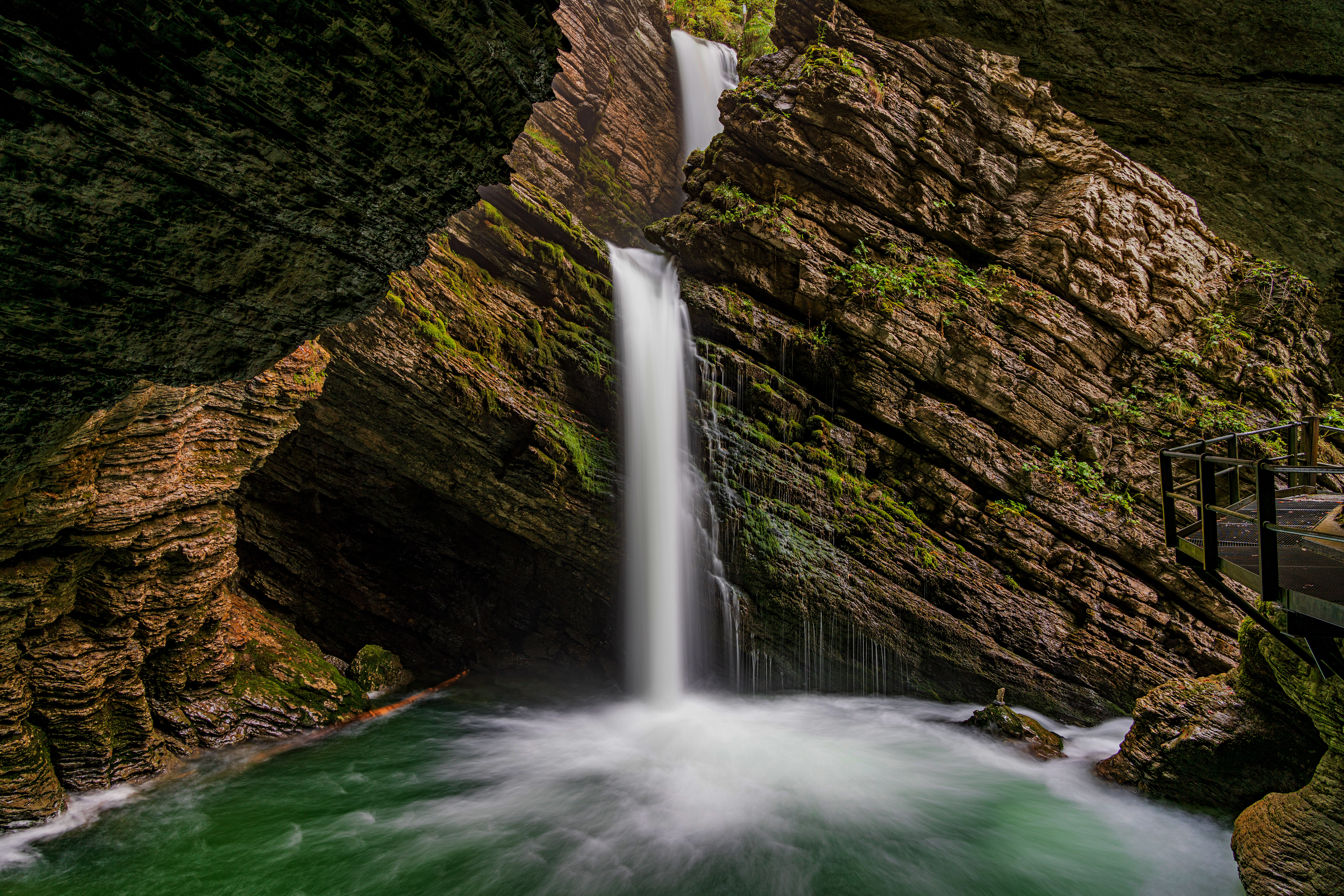
The lower waterfall

== See also ==
- List of waterfalls in Switzerland
- List of waterfalls
- Appenzell Alps
