= Wildhaus-Alt St. Johann =

- Municipality
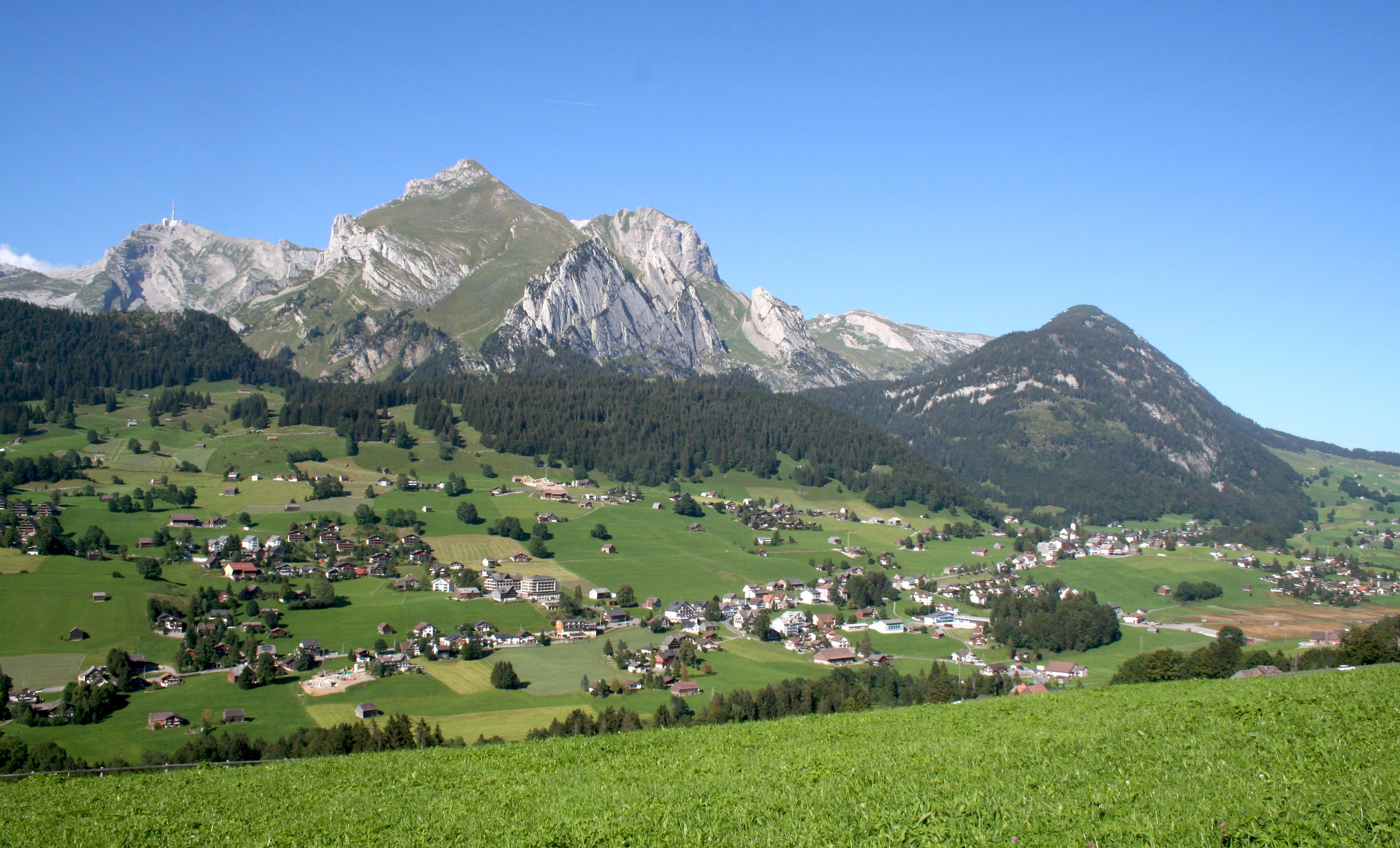
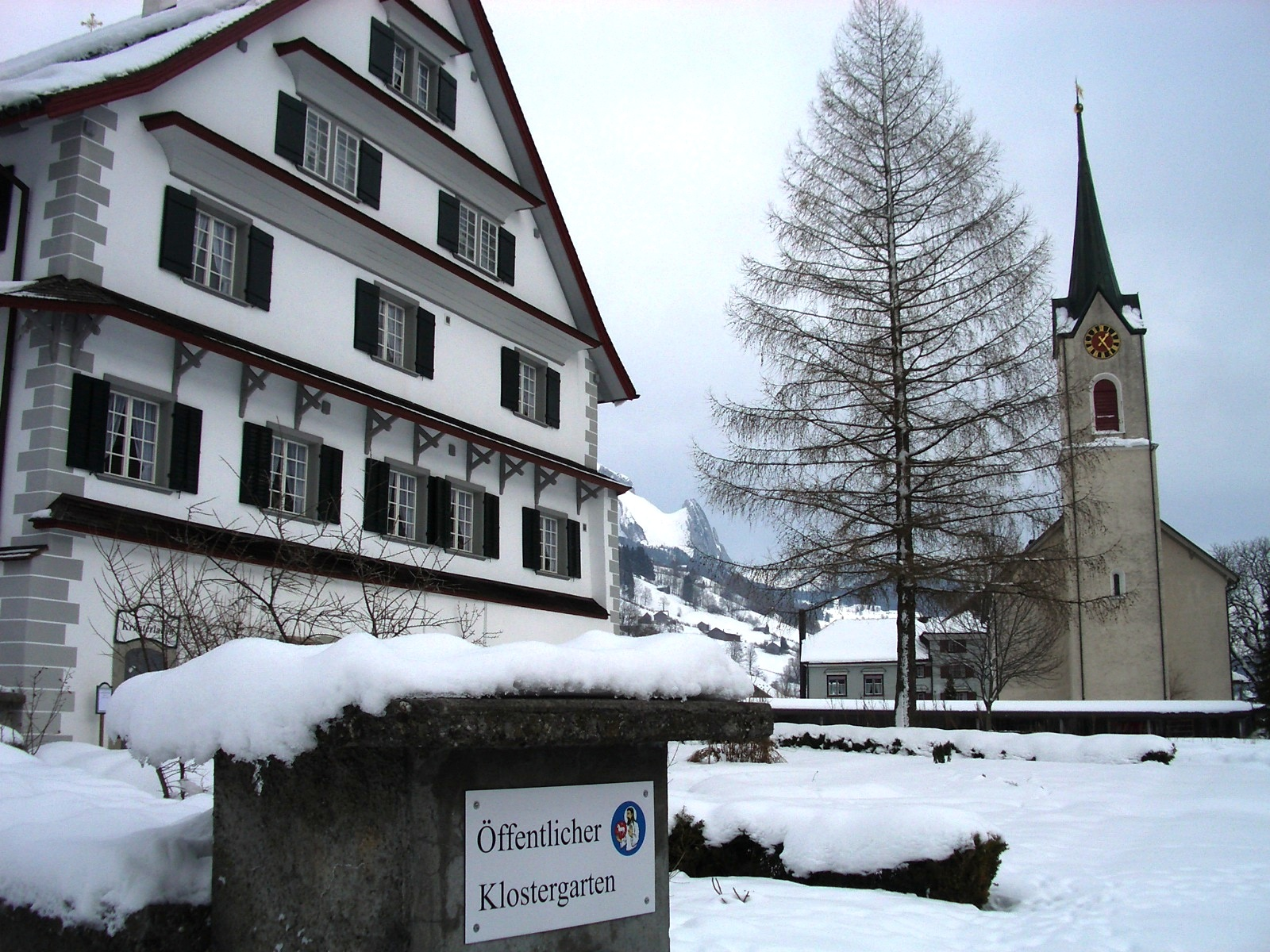
- Wildhaus-Alt Sankt Johann Alt Sankt Johann

- Flag Coat of arms
- Location of Wildhaus-Alt St. Johann
- Location within Switzerland Location within Canton of St. Gallen
- Coordinates: 47°11′N 9°17′E
- Country: Switzerland
- Canton: St. Gallen
- District: Toggenburg

Government
  - Mayor: Rolf Züllig (as of 2010)

Area
  - Total: 87.53 km^{2} (33.80 sq mi)
- Elevation: 895 m (2,936 ft)

Population (December 2020)
  - Total: 2,624
  - Density: 29.98/km^{2} (77.64/sq mi)
- Time zone: UTC+01:00 (CET)
  - Summer (DST): UTC+02:00 (CEST)
- Postal codes: 9656 Alt St. Johann; 9658 Wildhaus
- SFOS number: 3359
- ISO 3166 code: CH-SG
- Surrounded by: Amden, Grabs, Nesslau-Krummenau, Quarten, Stein, Walenstadt
- Website: www.wildhaus-altstjohann.ch

Wildhaus-Alt St. Johann is a municipality in the Wahlkreis (constituency) of Toggenburg in the canton of St. Gallen in Switzerland. It was formed on 1 January 2010, through the merger of Alt St. Johann and Wildhaus (which includes also Unterwasser).

Aerial view (1954)

== Demographics ==
The former municipalities that would become Wildhaus-Alt St. Johann had a combined population of 2,624 (as of December 2020).

== Historic population ==
The historical population is given in the following table:

year	population (Alt St. Johann)	population (Wildhaus)	population total
1850	1,623	1,163	2,786
1900	1,504	1,096	2,600
1950	1,434	1,150	2,584
2000	1,453	1,278	2,731

== Weather ==
Wildhaus has an average of 157 days of rain or snow per year and on average receives 1,640 mm (65 in) of precipitation. The wettest month is August, during which time Wildhaus receives an average of 202 mm (8.0 in) of rain or snow. During this month, there is precipitation for an average of 14.7 days. The month with the most days of precipitation is June, with an average of 15.8, but with only 199 mm (7.8 in) of rain or snow. The driest month of the year is October, with an average of 100 mm (3.9 in) of precipitation over 14.7 days.

== Heritage sites of national significance ==
The Paleolithic cave, Wildenmannlisloch in Alt St. Johann and the birthplace of the Reformer Huldrych Zwingli at Lisighus 167 in Wildhaus are listed as Swiss heritage sites of national significance.

== Transport ==
A PostAuto bus line links Alt St. Johann, Unterwasser and Wildhaus to Nesslau-Neu St. Johann, Wattwil and Buchs SG railway stations. There is a gondola lift/chair lift from Alt St. Johann to Alp Sellamatt. From Unterwasser, there is a funicular (Iltiosbahn) and aerial tram to Chäserrugg, one of the peaks of the Churfirsten. From Wildhaus, there are a gondola lift to Gamplüt (below Wildhauser Schafberg) and chair lifts to Oberdorf and Gamserrugg.

== See also ==
- List of ski areas and resorts in Switzerland
- Tourism in Switzerland
