= Unterwasser =

Village in Switzerland

Coordinates: 47°11′51″N 9°18′27″E

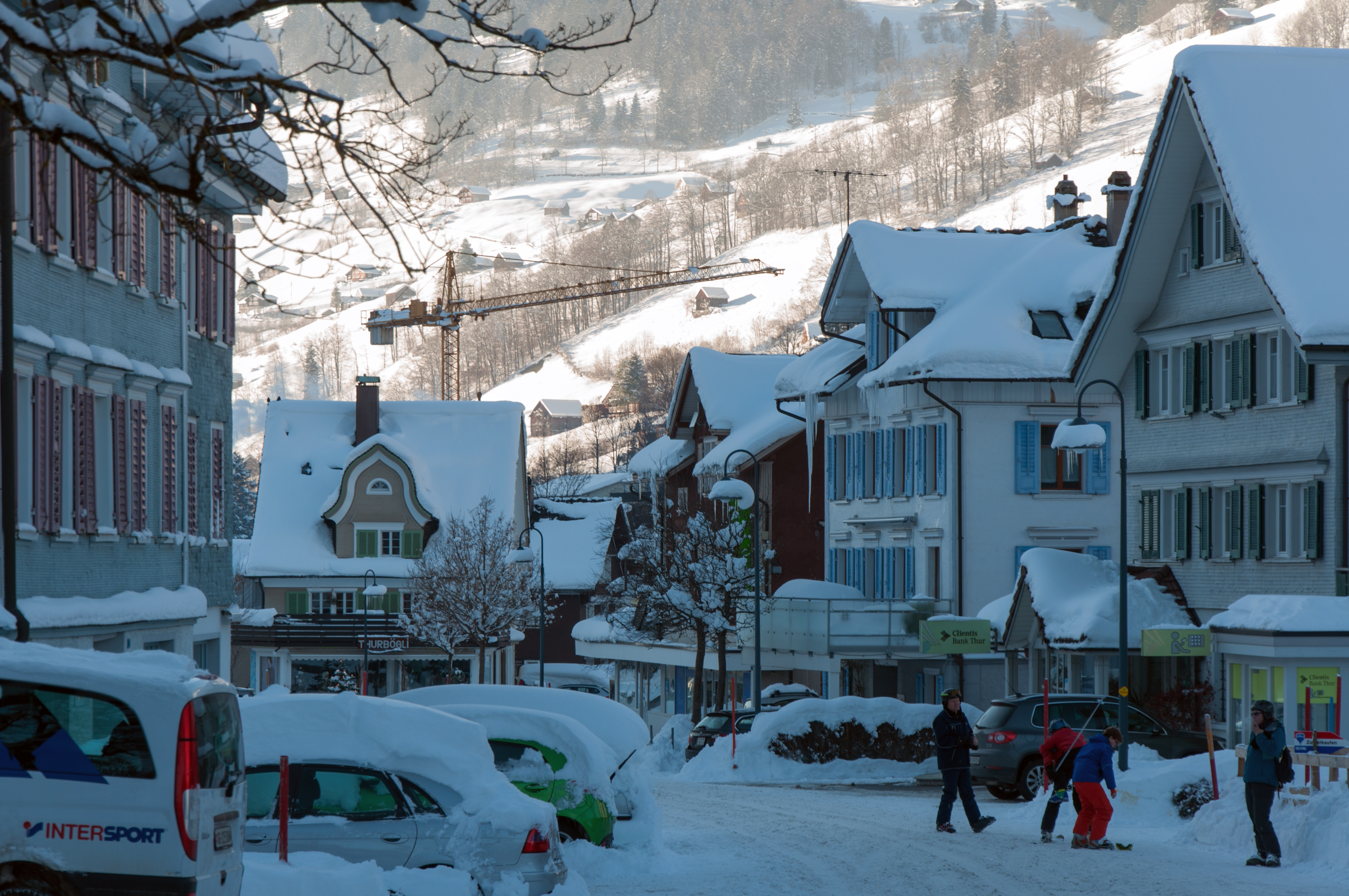
Unterwasser in 2015

Unterwasser (English: Underwater) is a village in the Toggenburg region of the canton of St. Gallen, Switzerland, situated at the confluence of the two streams forming the upper Thur (known as Säntisthur and Wildhausthur). Formerly part of Wildhaus municipality, it has since 2010 been part of Wildhaus-Alt St. Johann by merger of Wildhaus and Alt St. Johann. It is a relatively small ski resort, and many of its trails are shared with nearby Alt st. Johan.

Iltiosbahn, a funicular leads to Iltios and the aerial cableway to Chäserrugg.

The toponym was first recorded in the 15th century as under dem Wasser , or "below the water". Its population was 685 as of 2010 (down from 751 in 1990; historical population: 81 in 1827). The village was owned by the counts of Montfort in the earlier Middle Ages, later by St. Johann Abbey, and after 1555 by St. Gall Abbey.

Ski jumper Simon Ammann — winner of four gold medals in the 2002 and 2010 Winter Olympics, and World Champion 2007 — comes from Unterwasser.

Aerial view (1964)

== Notable sights ==
- Churfirsten – Mountain in Switzerland
- Schwendisee – Lake in St. Gallen, Switzerland
- Thur waterfalls – Two cascades on the upper part of the Thur river in Switzerland

== See also ==
- List of ski areas and resorts in Switzerland
- Tourism in Switzerland
