= Schwendisee =

Lake in St. Gallen, Switzerland

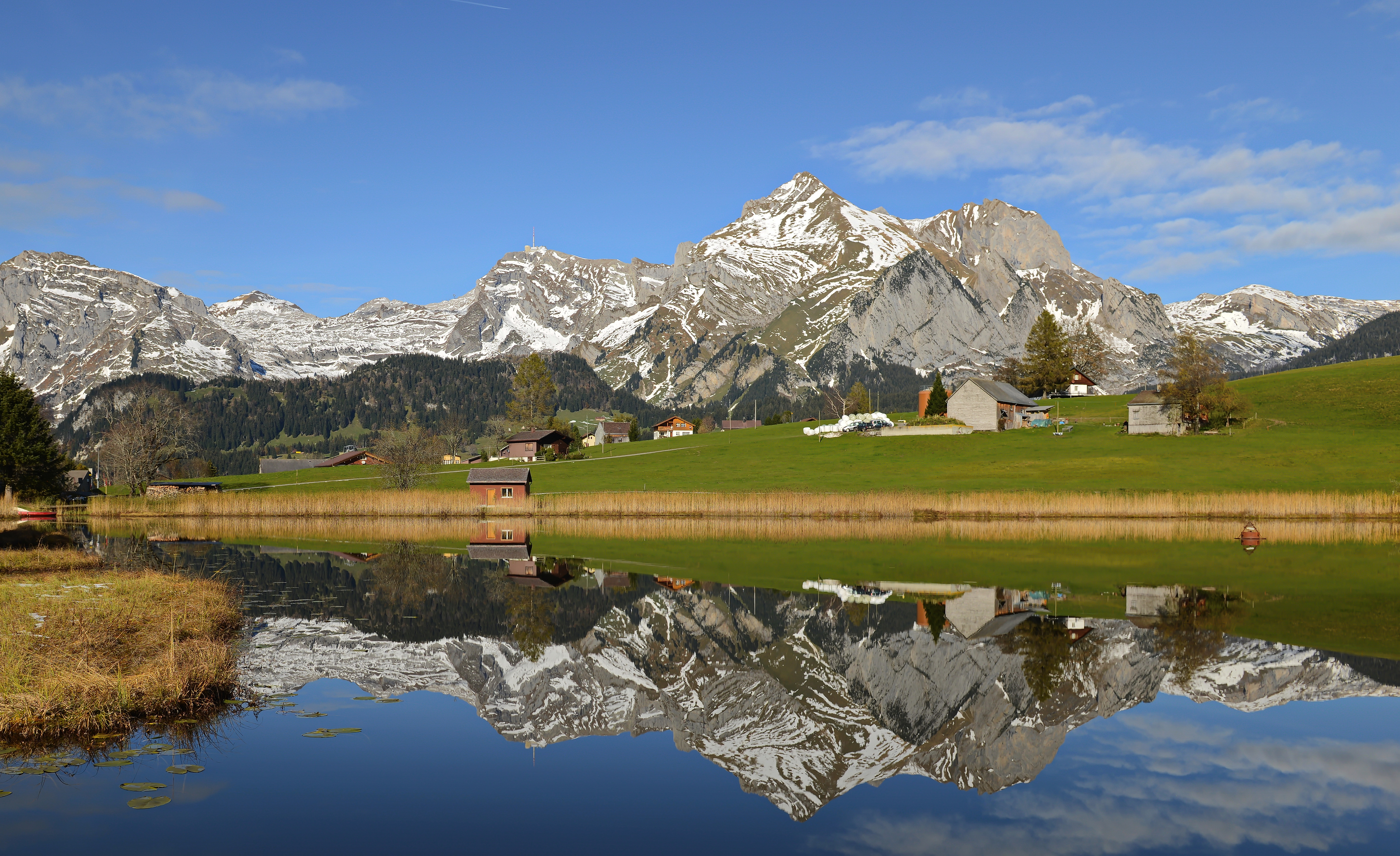
- Schwendisee and Alpstein

- Location within Canton of St. Gallen Location within Switzerland Location within Alps
- Interactive map of Schwendisee
- Location: Wildhaus-Alt St. Johann; Canton of St. Gallen
- Coordinates: 47.187°N 9.331°E
- Primary outflows: Seebach
- Basin countries: Switzerland
- Surface area: 3.3 ha (8.2 acres)
- Max. depth: 9.7 m (32 ft)
- Surface elevation: 1,159 m (3,802 ft)

Schwendisee is a small lake above Wildhaus on the slopes of the Churfirsten, in Toggenburg, Canton of St. Gallen, Switzerland. Besides the main lake (Vorderer Schwendisee, lit. 'Anterior Lake Schwendi'), there is a smaller lake nearby (Hinterer Schwendisee, lit. 'Posterior Lake Schwendi'). Together they are referred to as the Schwendiseen in German.

== Name ==
Schwendisee is a combination of two words - ‘Schwendi’ and ‘see’, where Schwandi refers to the glacier that melted about 1,400 years ago to form the lakes, and ‘see’ translates to 'lake' in English.

== Description ==
The elevation of the lake is about 1,150 metres (3,770 ft) above sea level. It is about 250 m (820 ft) long and 150 m (490 ft) wide. Sediment cores from the lakes have been studied and provide a record of the climate of the last 600 years.

Schwendisee is nestled in moorland where the waterbody is divided into the Vorderer Schwendisee and the Hinterer Schwendisee separated by strip of forest. The larger Vorderer Schwendisee is open to visitors for fishing, swimming and hiking (it is located on the Klangweg, lit. 'Sound Trail'). A broadwalk extends to the middle of the lake to allow visitors to enter the water. Both lakes are surrounded by dense reeds and marshes and also have small creeks feeding the flora.

Visitors can find barbeque facilities at either side of the lake and the Hotel Seegüetli on the northern end of the lake. The lakes can be reached from Wildhaus on foot or using the chair lift to Oberdorf.

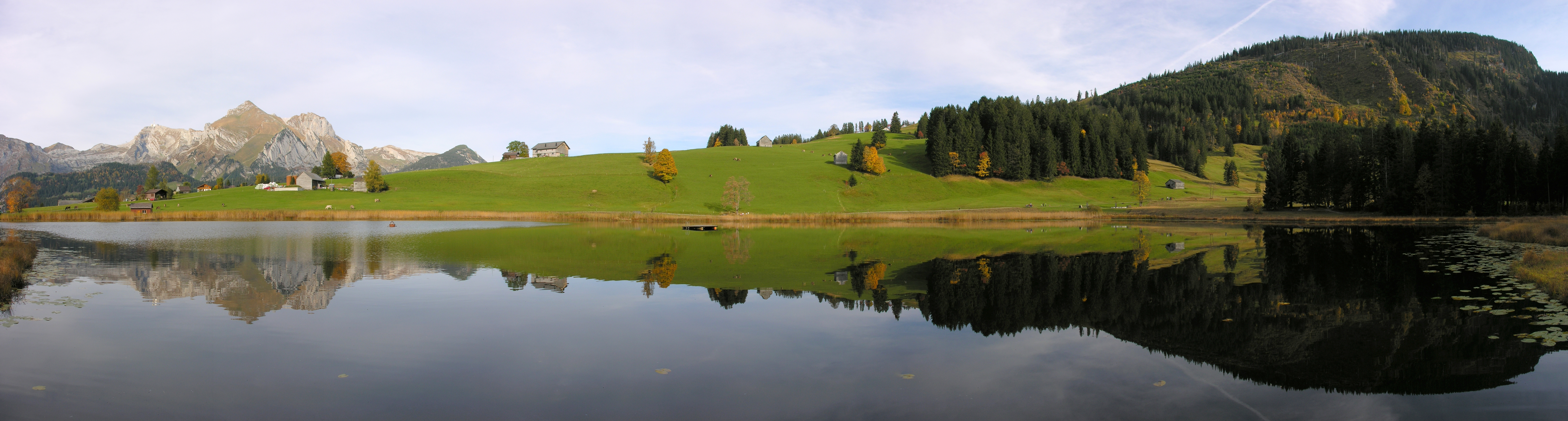
Vorderer Schwendisee (Säntis and Altmann in the background)
