= Cross-country skiing trail =

Route designed for cross-country skiing

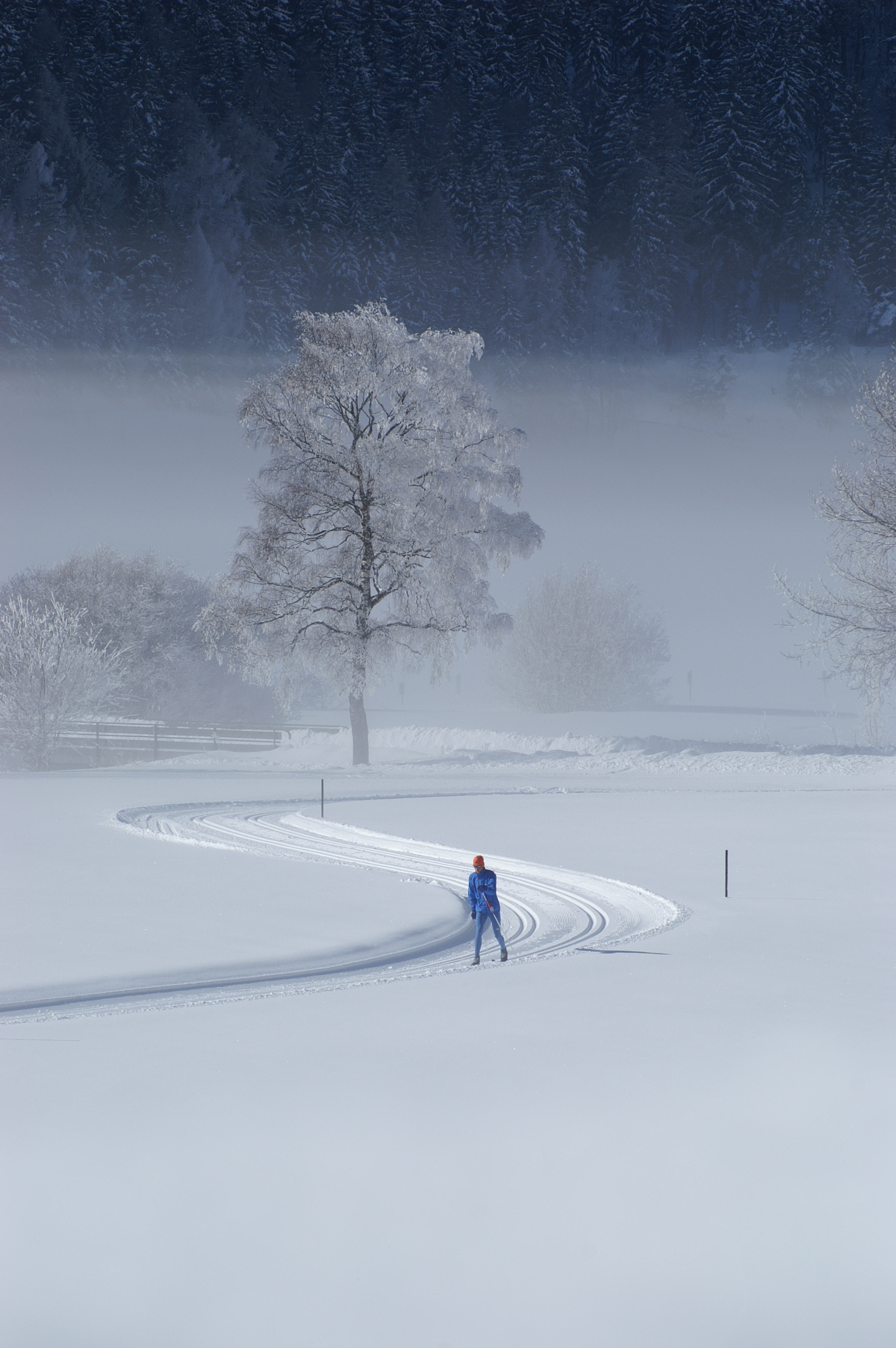
Recreational cross-country trail in Tyrol, groomed for classic skiing only.

A cross-country skiing trail or loipe (Note: From German: Loipe or Langlaufloipe, pl. –n, loipe is a loanword in English-language travel guides, referring to cross-country ski trails in Europe. It is a Germanization of the Norwegian word, løype, which originally meant a steep channel used to slide logs downhill into the valleys and which in turn came from the verb laupe ("run") whose causative løype, can translate as "to get running".) is a route that has been laid out, constructed and maintained specifically for cross-country skiing. Trails may extend point-to-point, but are more typically loops for recreational use or for competition. Until the mid-20th Century, trails were tracked by the passage of skiers. More recently, snow groomers set tracks for classic skiing and smooth lanes for skate skiing.

== Recreational ==
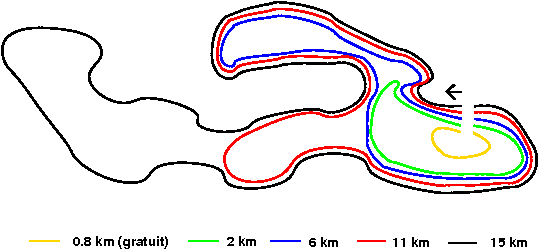
Schematic example of a cross-country skiing trail network at a ski resort in Gresse-en-Vercors, France

Cross-country ski venues often comprise a system of trails or loipes of varying length and difficulty that loop back to a starting point. Often trails branch out from a common segment; the more challenging ones then branch off on longer legs. The length of each loop, including segments that coincide with other loops, is typically counted separately. Consequently, the total length of loops is greater than the total length of trail structure. In some regions, skiers may travel between cross-country ski resorts, which are linked by point-to-point trails; (Note: In German, Skifernwanderweg, pl. –e.) these include:

- Grande Traversée du Jura
- Fernskiwanderweg Schonach–Belchen in the Black Forest
- Bayerwaldloipe in the Bavarian Forest
- Skimagistrale Erzgebirge/Krušné hory in the Ore Mountains
- Catamount Trail, which extends the length of Vermont

Trail use fees are common at commercial ski venues and may also be found in jurisdictions where skiing occurs on public land; usually there are day, week and annual passes. Venues charging fees may also offer use of heated facilities with a lounge, waxing room, and toilets. In jurisdictions where trail maintenance and grooming has traditionally been funded through taxes, transitions to a user-fee-based system, initiated by increasingly budget-constrained governments, have been met with opposition from those who advocate for the users of loipes, as occurred in East Saxony where an automated kiosk system for trail passes was proposed for 2007.

=== Layout and construction ===
An example of guidance for cross-country ski trail construction comes from Northern Arizona University, which cites the manual, "Recreational Trail Design and Construction," developed by the Minnesota Extension Service of the University of Minnesota It emphasizes the following aspects of recreational cross-country trail layout and construction:

- Trail layout and length – The trail system should comprise loops with internal connectors and cutoffs that allow the skier discretion in how long to ski. Loop lengths should range from 5 to 15 km with a beginners loop of about 1 km. Minimum clearing widths should range between 3 and 5 meters, depending on what type of skiing is accommodated and whether a steep section would require herringbone technique uphill or turns downhill. Grades should usually be less than 5% rise over run for general skiing with occasional sustained pitches of 10% and short (less-than-50-m) pitches of up to 25%.
- Trail construction – Trails should be smooth enough and free from protrusions to accommodate grooming when snow depth reaches 0.3 m. A sod surface with mowable vegetation reduces erosion and retains snow. Trails should have gentle curves, especially avoiding sharp turns at the bottom of downhills. Bridges should accommodate 5-tonne maintenance equipment.
- Other considerations – Cross-country ski trails are considered compatible with winter snowshoeing and summer hiking and bicycling. They are considered to be incompatible with snowmobiling and wheeled traffic. Cross-country skiing venues should have adequate parking areas, rest areas for skiers, shelters every 15 to 20 km, and appropriate signage.

=== Signage ===
The signage for trails or loipes may be governed by standards or practices. In North America, they follow the practice of the Cross-Country Ski Areas Association. German ski trail signage conforms to DIN standards, which establish coding for the difficulty of the routes and other norms for Loipen.:

Signage denoting level of difficulty for trails

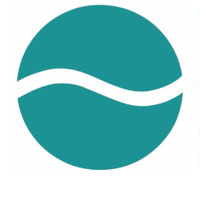
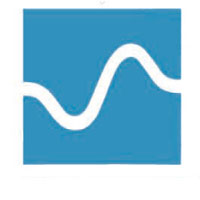
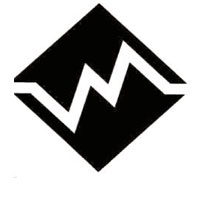
North American Symbol	Symbol Difficulty	German Symbol	Color Difficulty
	Green circle Easy		Blue; Easy
	Blue square More Difficult		Red; Medium
	Black diamond Most Difficult		Black; Difficult

== Competition ==
Course layout of the cross-country skiing events at the Olympic Winter Games at Whistler Winter Park for the 2010 Winter Olympics. Red and blue denotes separate 5-km courses for skiathlon events (classic + skating).

In its "Cross-country homologation manual," the FIS recognizes that fans of the sport wish to follow it on television. With this in mind, the manual addresses how to design the race course in a manner that not only enhances the experience of spectators, but of viewers, as well—not just to show the athletes in action, but to show the ways in which fans enjoy the action. The manual describes considerations regarding race courses, including:

- Course design criteria
- Requirements for different race formats
- Course layouts
- Courses for skiers with disabilities

=== Course design criteria ===
In its manual, the FIS requires that courses be designed for the following race formats; Interval start, mass start, sprint and team sprint, relay and skiathlon; each has distance requirements and width requirements, which pertain primarily to up hills; each also has requirements for the number and types of climbs. The FIS requires that competition venues consist of two separate courses to accommodate the classic and skating components of the skiathlon competition, each 5 km long with cut-offs that create finer course length adjustment. The two combine to be a single 10 km course.

A course is expected to test the skier's technical and physical abilities, to be laid out in a manner that takes advantage of the natural terrain, and to provide smooth transitions among uphills, downhills and "undulating" terrain (distributed approximately evenly among the three). The manual advocates that courses present a variety of uphills, varying in lengths and gradients between 6% and 12%, and which are arrayed efficiently within the venue. Terms include: definitions of climbs—major (9–18% for more than 30 m), short (9–18% for 10 to 29 m) and steep (greater than 18% for less than 10 m)—and definitions for maximum climb, total climb and for various differences in height, along the way. Course widths vary among 3, 6, 9 and 12 m, depending on the event.

== Grooming ==
Until well into the 20th century and the advent of mechanized trail grooming, cross-country tracks were always made by the first skiers to pass through undisturbed, fresh snow and leave a parallel set of ski tracks behind them. Certain local and regional trails are available where the passage of skiers is the sole source of tracks.

=== Grooming guidance ===
The "USSA Cross-Country Technical Handbook" provides guidance on equipment and techniques used in modern mechanized snow grooming operations. A snowmobile or a snow groomer may be equipped with attachments to groom smooth lanes for skate skiing and for setting classic tracks. Techniques and tools used depend on the condition of the snow, which may range between freshly fallen to congealed and icy.

- Groomers – Whereas small cross-country venues may use snow machines, race venues typically use large grooming machines, which are between 2.5 and 5.5 m wide and can groom a large area. Snowmobiles are better for setting of classic tracks in an ideal line.
- Grooming attachments – Attachments for large groomers include: a front blade, a tiller, a renovator and track setter. The leading front blade repositions snow in front of the machine for trailing equipment to recondition. The renovator digs into the snow pack to aerate and mix the old and new snow up to 30 cm deep, as needed. The tiller attached behind the machine conditions the snow into a soft, granular consistency, ready for its comb, which packs the snow into a finished surface. For setting classic tracks, the groomer trails special pans, which mould the tracks. Attachments for snowmobiles perform the same functions at a smaller scale and include a roller to compact the snow over a wide swath and a drag to level the snow behind the roller.
- Grooming procedures – Grooming is best done with a falling temperature—typically after nightfall—to prevent excessive hardening. Once groomed, the tilled surface needs 1–2 hours to coalesce. Too-frequent grooming can destroy snow crystals and contaminate snow with oil and dirt.
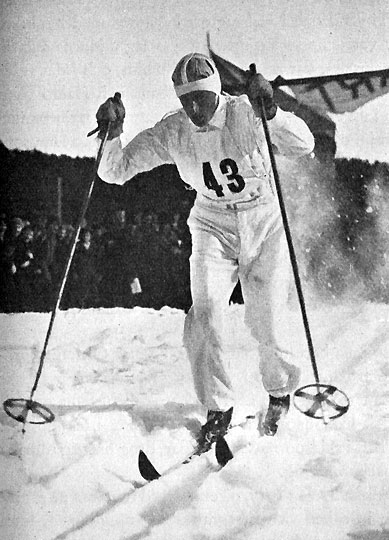
Swedish cross-country ski racer on a track set by other skiers, ca. 1935.

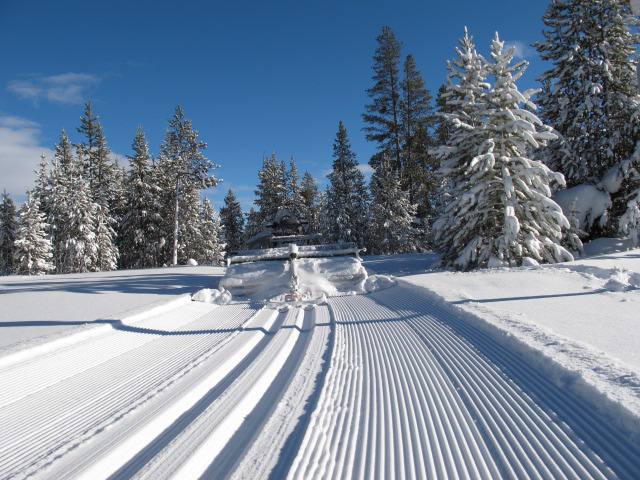
Cross Country Ski Trail - Setting corduroy and classic tracks.

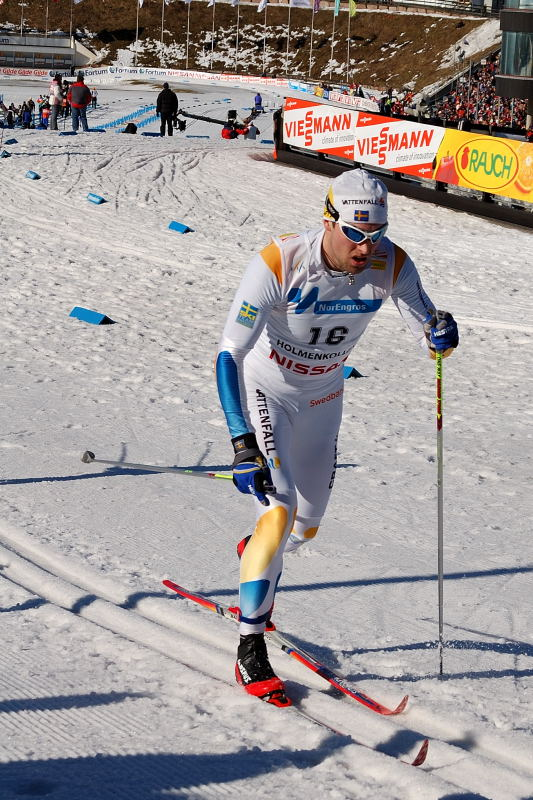
Swedish cross-country ski racer on a track set by machine in 2007.

=== Snow conditions ===
Snow conditions define the tools and techniques needed for grooming. The "Cross Country Canada officials manual" explains snow conditions, starting with fundamentals of heat gain and loss In the snow layer, which include:

- The temperature gradient within the snow pack from the surface to the ground.
- Incoming ultra-violet radiation from sunlight, which heats the snow surface and can cause melting within the top few centimeters of the snowpack.
- Outgoing infrared radiation, which in clear conditions may cool the snow surface.
- Rain, which transfers heat directly to the snow and may remain as liquid water in the snowpack.
- Wind, whose dominant effect is cooling through evaporation and consequently creates loss of mass in the snow pack

These factors contribute to the metamorphism of snow, i.e. the process of reshaping snow crystals into smaller, more rounded ice grains, which in turn consolidates and settles the snow pack. Increased density increases strength by joining of grains though sintering and freezing of melted water. New-fallen snow may have a density of 150 – 200 kg/m^{3}. Whereas a snowmobile can pack snow to a density of 300 – 350 kg/m^{3}, the densities required for recreational trails are 450 kg/m^{3} and for racing, 500 kg/m^{3} or higher.

=== Grooming basics ===
As described in the "Cross Country Canada officials manual," basic grooming involves six processes, as follows:

- Packing with rollers or other compaction devices achieves an increase in snow density.
- Surface shaping restores trails to a flat surface, using blades or drag graders.
- Conditioning to accelerate the aging processes and increase bonding of snow crystals within the snow pack; this may be done with a tiller.
- Mixing of new snow with older lower snow, using deep cutting implements allows the snow pack to set up better.
- Renovation creates a reduction in snow density and may include surface scarification or deep renovation with tools that cut to the desired depth.
- Power tilling to bring up and mix fresher snow from lower layers.

=== Course preparation for classic and skating techniques ===
According to the "Cross Country Canada officials manual," FIS Rule 315.3.2 (ICR 2004) requires the following: “The ski tracks must be prepared so that ski control and gliding are possible without a lateral braking effect by any parts of the bindings. The two tracks should be set 17–30 cm. apart, measured from the middle of each track. The depth of the track should be 2–5 cm, even in hard or frozen snow.” FIS Rule 315.3.1 (ICR 2004) requires that for classic technique events a single track should "be set along the ideal skiing line of the competition course," which is normally through the middle of the trail, except for those curves that are too sharp, where the track should disappear.

According to the same manual, FIS rule 315.4.1 (ICR 2004) reads: "For interval start competitions in free technique the course must be well-packed for a width of at least 4 meters." Tracks are no longer current practice for free-style races, where the skating technique prevails.

== Cross-country skiing trails by country ==
- List of cross-country skiing trails in Switzerland
