= Wildhuser Schafberg =

Mountain in Switzerland

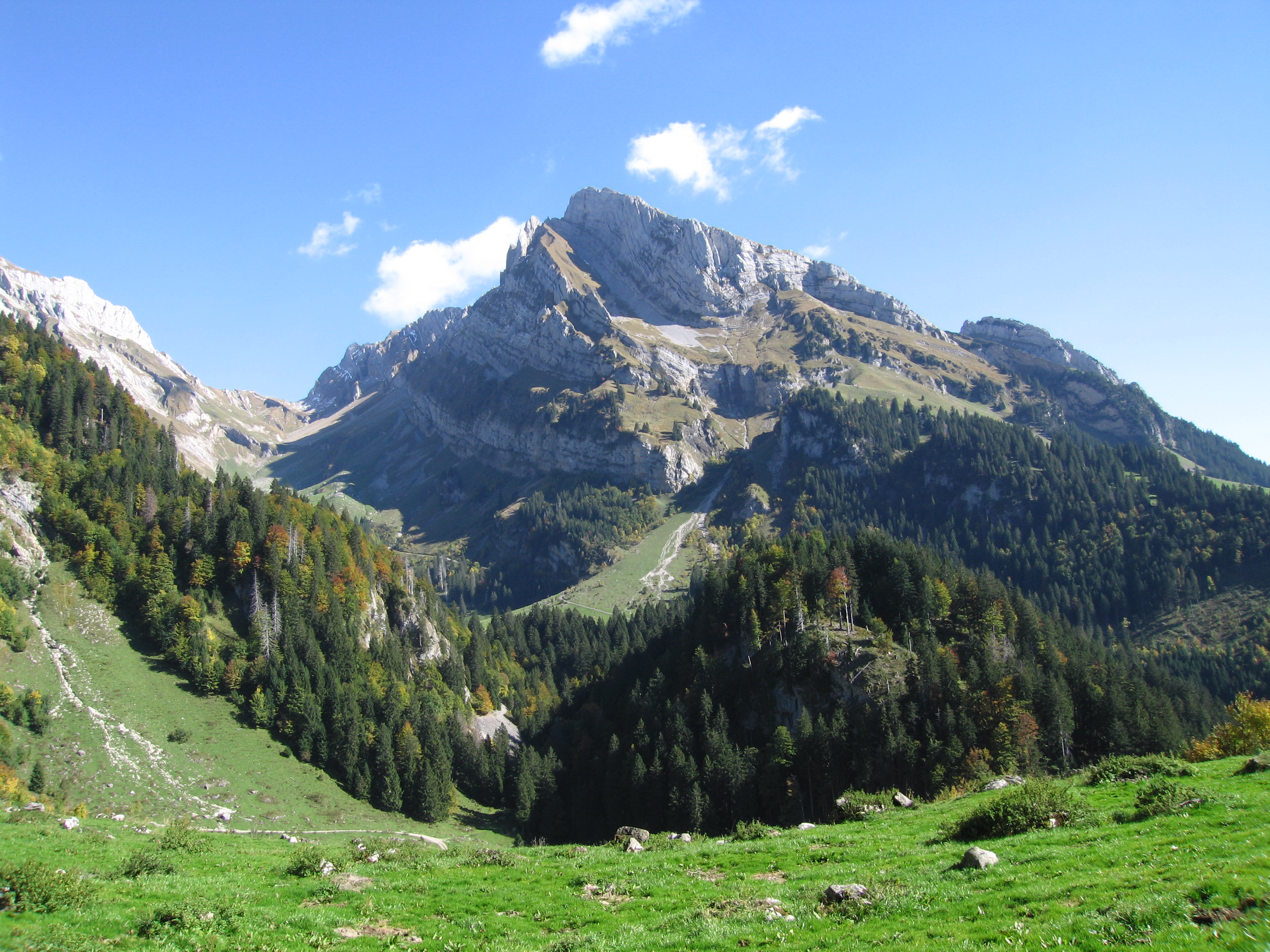
- The west side

Highest point
- Elevation: 2,373 m (7,785 ft)
- Prominence: 133 m (436 ft)
- Parent peak: Altmann
- Coordinates: 47°13′46″N 9°21′8″E

Geography
- Location within Switzerland Location within Canton of St. Gallen
- Location: Toggenburg, Canton of St. Gallen
- Country: Switzerland
- Parent range: Appenzell Alps

The Wildhuser Schafberg is a mountain of the Appenzell Alps, overlooking the village of Wildhaus in the canton of St. Gallen (Toggenburg region). It is situated in the massif of the Alpstein, on the range west of the Altmann.

Gamplüt, below the mountain, is accessible by a gondola lift from Wildhaus.

== See also ==
- List of mountains of the canton of St. Gallen
