= Wildhaus =

Village in St. Gallen, Switzerland

- Former municipality
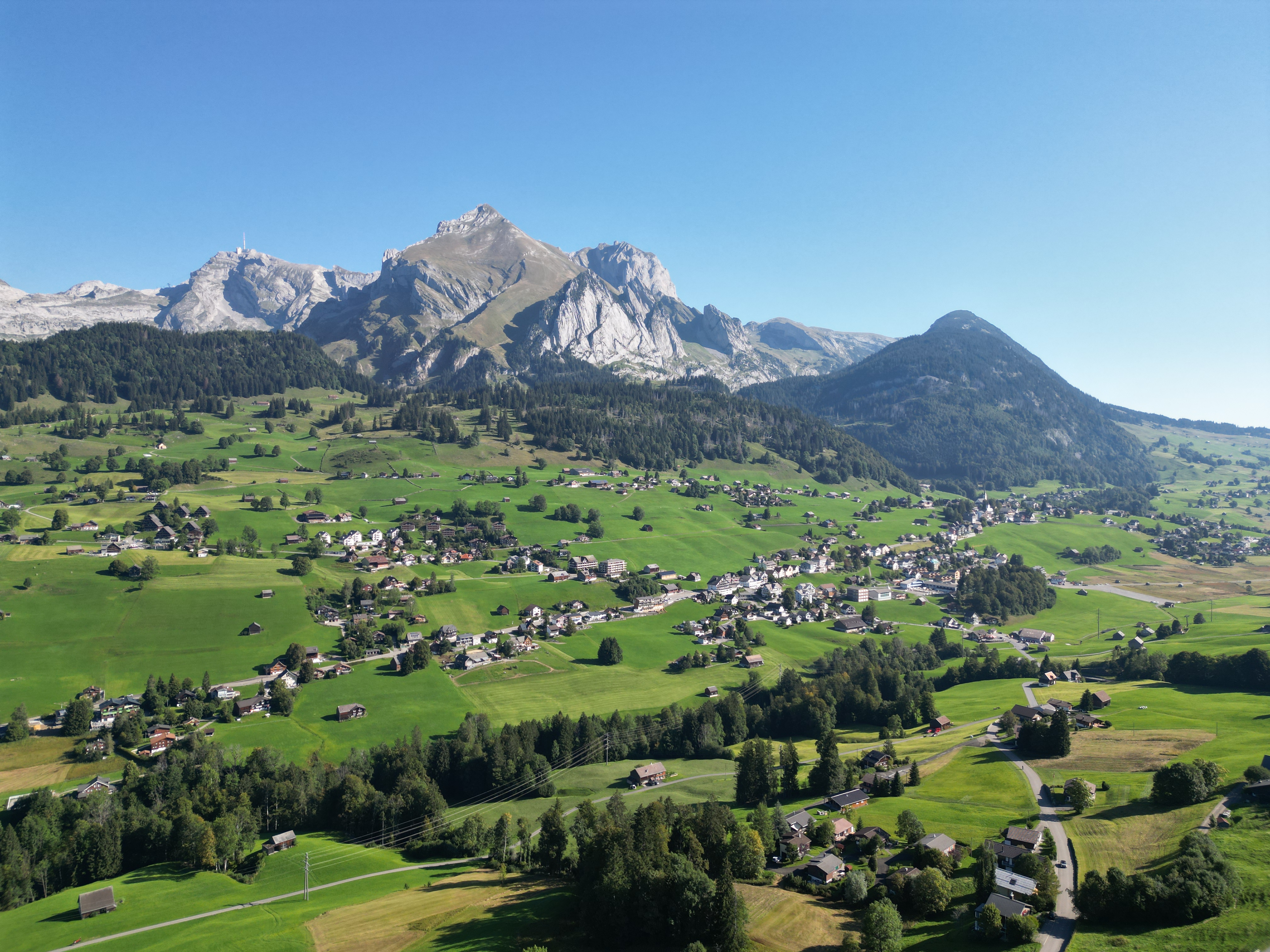
- Wildhaus and Alpstein massif

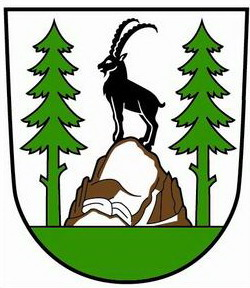
- Coat of arms
- Location of Wildhaus
- Location within Switzerland Location within Canton of St. Gallen
- Coordinates: 47°12′N 9°21′E
- Country: Switzerland
- Canton: St. Gallen
- District: Wahlkreis Toggenburg

Government
  - Mayor: Thomas Diezig (as of 2025)

Area
  - Total: 34.43 km^{2} (13.29 sq mi)
- Elevation: 1,095 m (3,593 ft)

Population (December 2008)
  - Total: 1,209
  - Density: 35.11/km^{2} (90.95/sq mi)
- Time zone: UTC+01:00 (CET)
  - Summer (DST): UTC+02:00 (CEST)
- Postal code: 9658
- SFOS number: 3357
- ISO 3166 code: CH-SG
- Surrounded by: Alt Sankt Johann, Gams, Grabs, Hundwil (AR), Nesslau-Krummenau, Rüte (AI), Schwende (AI), Sennwald
- Website: www.wildhaus.ch

Wildhaus (High Alemannic: Wildhuus) is a village and former municipality in the Toggenburg region of the canton of St. Gallen in Switzerland, since 2010 by merger with Alt St. Johann part of the municipality of Wildhaus-Alt St. Johann.

The Protestant reformer Huldrych Zwingli was born in Wildhaus in 1484. His birth house can still be visited.

== Geography ==
Wildhaus has an area, as of 2006, of 34.4 km^{2} (13.3 sq mi). Of this area, 50.6% is used for agricultural purposes, while 22.8% is forested. Of the rest of the land, 4.1% is settled (buildings or roads) and the remainder (22.5%) is non-productive (rivers or lakes). One of those lakes is the Schwendisee.

The village is located on Wildhaus Pass (1,090 m (3,580 ft)) from Gams, in the Rhine valley, to Unterwasser in Toggenburg between the Churfirsten peaks and Säntis. The ski slopes above Wildhaus, Unterwasser and Alt St. Johann on the Churfirsten ranges reach 2,262 m (7,421 ft).

The municipalities of Alt St. Johann and Wildhaus merged into the municipality of Wildhaus-Alt St. Johann on 1 January 2010.

== Coat of arms ==
The blazon of the municipal coat of arms is Argent an Ibex Sable on a Stone proper between two Pine Trees Vert issuant from a Base of the last.

== Demographics ==
Wildhaus has a population (as of 2008) of 1,209, of which about 11.1% are foreign nationals. Of the foreign population, (as of 2000), 20 are from Germany, 3 are from Italy, 77 are from ex-Yugoslavia, 7 are from Austria, 5 are from Turkey, and 55 are from another country. Over the last 10 years the population has decreased at a rate of −8.1%. Most of the population (as of 2000) speaks German (91.8%), with Albanian being second most common (2.4%) and Serbo-Croatian being third (1.8%). Of the Swiss national languages (as of 2000), 1,157 speak German, 5 people speak French, 2 people speak Italian, and 3 people speak Romansh.

The age distribution, as of 2000, in Wildhaus is; 140 children or 11.1% of the population are between 0 and 9 years old and 204 teenagers or 16.2% are between 10 and 19. Of the adult population, 139 people or 11.0% of the population are between 20 and 29 years old. 170 people or 13.5% are between 30 and 39, 179 people or 14.2% are between 40 and 49, and 150 people or 11.9% are between 50 and 59. The senior population distribution is 128 people or 10.2% of the population are between 60 and 69 years old, 102 people or 8.1% are between 70 and 79, there are 40 people or 3.2% who are between 80 and 89, and there are 8 people or 0.6% who are between 90 and 99.

In 2000 there were 202 persons (or 16.0% of the population) who were living alone in a private dwelling. There were 255 (or 20.2%) persons who were part of a couple (married or otherwise committed) without children, and 646 (or 51.3%) who were part of a couple with children. There were 74 (or 5.9%) people who lived in single parent home, while there are 17 persons who were adult children living with one or both parents, 4 persons who lived in a household made up of relatives, and 62 who are either institutionalized or live in another type of collective housing.

In the 2007 federal election the most popular party was the SVP which received 39.5% of the vote. The next three most popular parties were the FDP (21.3%), the CVP (18.5%) and the SP (10.1%).

The entire Swiss population is generally well educated. In Wildhaus about 69% of the population (between age 25–64) have completed either non-mandatory upper secondary education or additional higher education (either University or a Fachhochschule). Out of the total population in Wildhaus, as of 2000, the highest education level completed by 315 people (25.0% of the population) was Primary, while 448 (35.6%) have completed their secondary education, 136 (10.8%) have attended a Tertiary school, and 32 (2.5%) are not in school. The remainder did not answer this question.

== Heritage sites of national significance ==
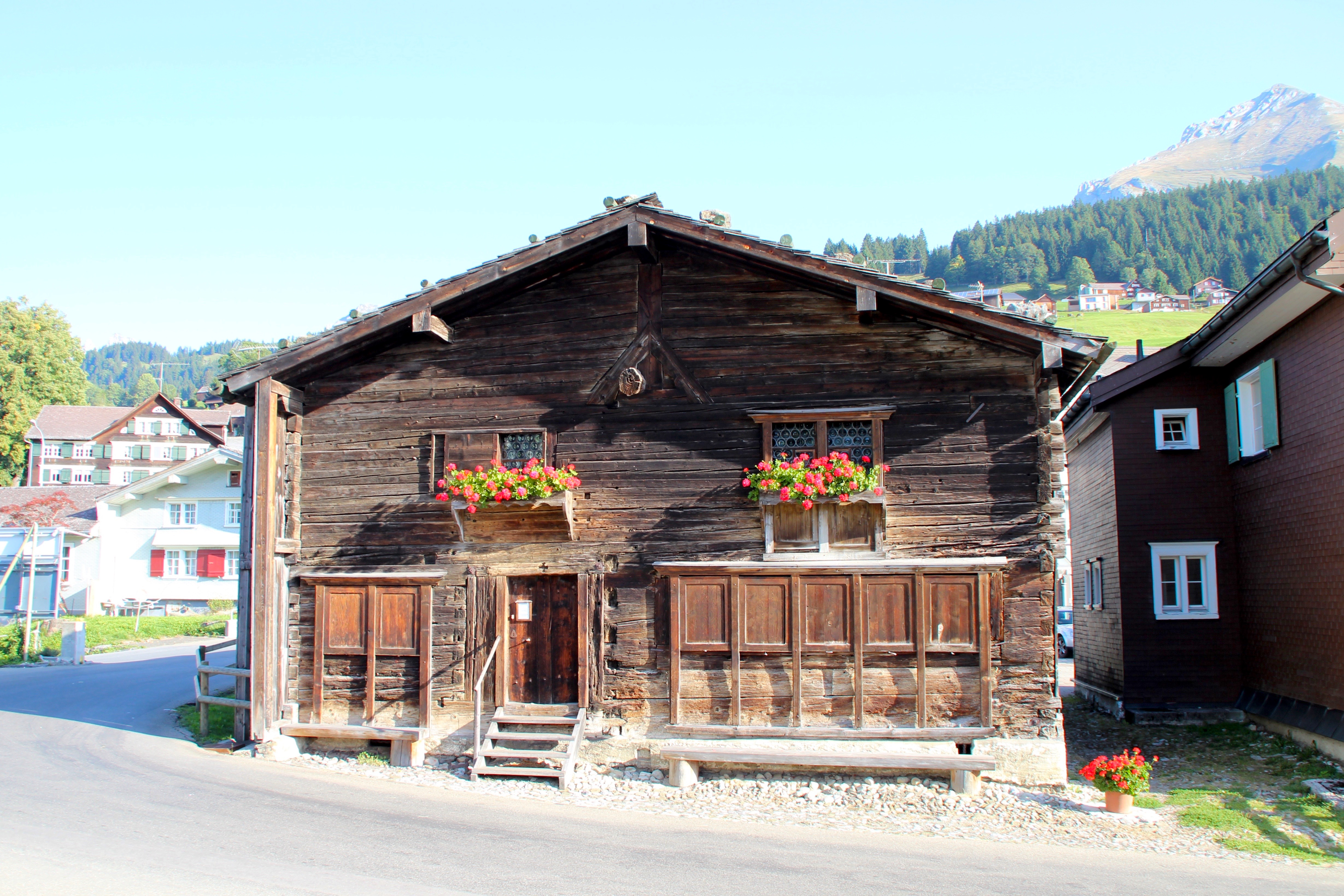
Zwingli's birth house

The Birthplace of the reformer Huldrych Zwingli at Lisighus 167 is listed as a Swiss heritage site of national significance.

The ruins of the Wildenburg, a former castle that was originally built in 1200 by the barons of Sax and sold to the earl Friedrich IV von Toggenburg in 1313. The castle was hit by a lightning and burned down in 1660. In 2010 the restoration of the place was completed and it has become a worthy place to visit.

== Economy ==
As of 2007, Wildhaus had an unemployment rate of 1.25%. As of 2005, there were 133 people employed in the primary economic sector and about 52 businesses involved in this sector. 60 people are employed in the secondary sector and there are 19 businesses in this sector. 403 people are employed in the tertiary sector, with 51 businesses in this sector.

As of October 2009 the average unemployment rate was 2.2%. There were 122 businesses in the municipality of which 18 were involved in the secondary sector of the economy while 56 were involved in the third.

As of 2000 there were 466 residents who worked in the municipality, while 194 residents worked outside Wildhaus and 164 people commuted into the municipality for work.

== Transport ==
Wildhaus is linked via a PostAuto bus line to Nesslau-Neu St. Johann, Wattwil and Buchs SG railway stations. There are a gondola lift to Gamplüt (below Wildhauser Schafberg) and chair lifts to Oberdorf and Gamserrugg (the mountain east of Chäserrugg).

== Religion ==
From the 2000 census, 468 or 37.1% are Roman Catholic, while 572 or 45.4% belonged to the Swiss Reformed Church. Of the rest of the population, there are 17 individuals (or about 1.35% of the population) who belong to the Orthodox Church, and there are 17 individuals (or about 1.35% of the population) who belong to another Christian church. There are 49 (or about 3.89% of the population) who are Islamic. There are 3 individuals (or about 0.24% of the population) who belong to another church (not listed on the census), 88 (or about 6.98% of the population) belong to no church, are agnostic or atheist, and 46 individuals (or about 3.65% of the population) did not answer the question.

== Weather ==
Wildhaus has an average of 157 days of rain or snow per year and on average receives 1,640 mm (65 in) of precipitation. The wettest month is August during which time Wildhaus receives an average of 202 mm (8.0 in) of rain or snow. During this month there is precipitation for an average of 14.7 days. The month with the most days of precipitation is June, with an average of 15.8, but with only 199 mm (7.8 in) of rain or snow. The driest month of the year is October with an average of 100 mm (3.9 in) of precipitation over 14.7 days.

== See also ==
- List of ski areas and resorts in Switzerland
- Tourism in Switzerland
