= Alt St. Johann =

- Former municipality
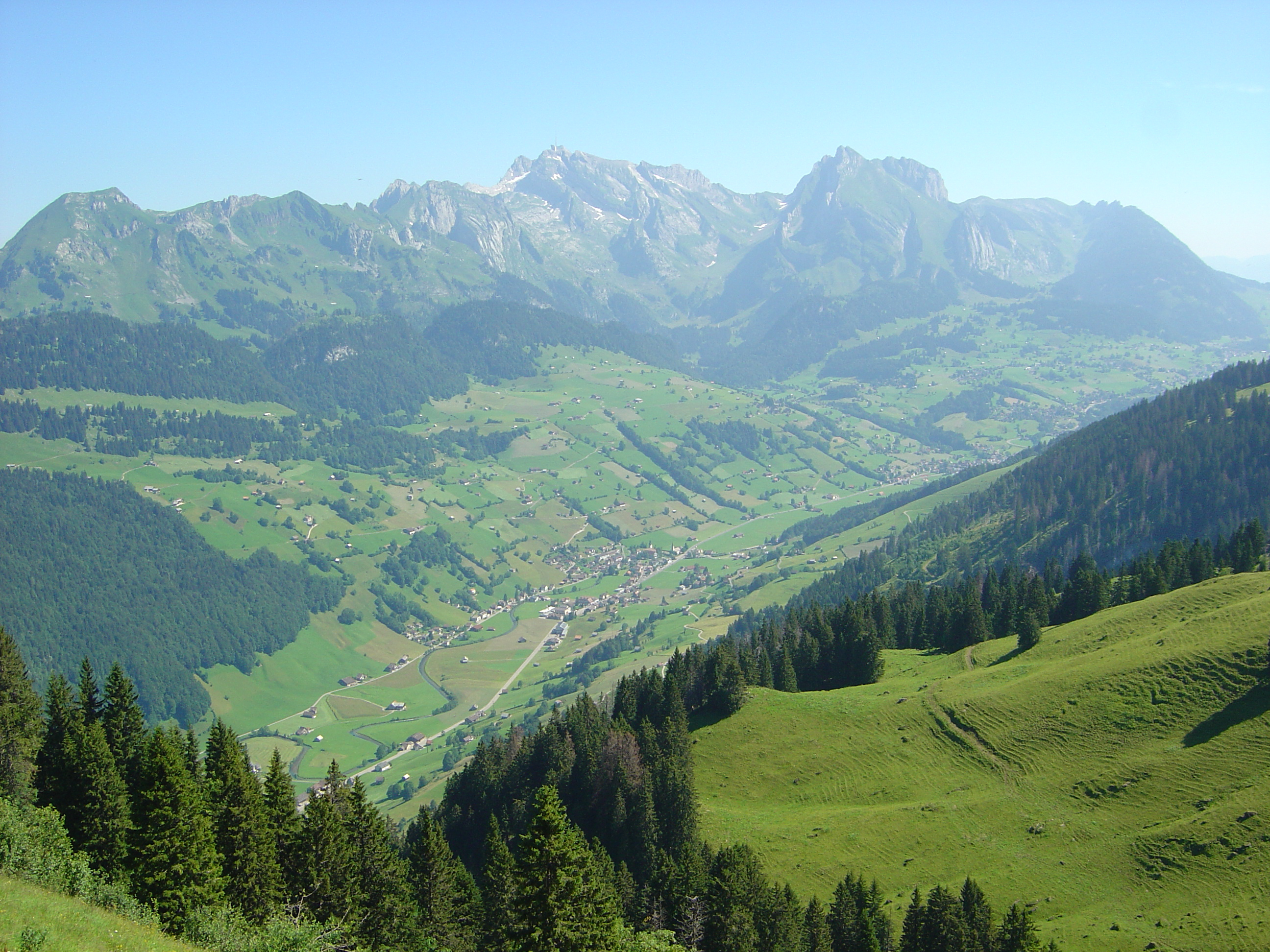

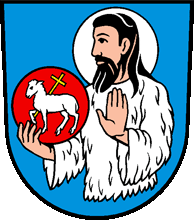
- Coat of arms
- Location of Alt St. Johann
- Location within Switzerland Location within Canton of St. Gallen
- Coordinates: 47°11′N 9°17′E
- Country: Switzerland
- Canton: St. Gallen
- District: Toggenburg

Government
  - Mayor: Rolf Züllig

Area
  - Total: 53.10 km^{2} (20.50 sq mi)
- Elevation: 895 m (2,936 ft)

Population (Dec 2009)
  - Total: 1,466
  - Density: 27.61/km^{2} (71.51/sq mi)
- Time zone: UTC+01:00 (CET)
  - Summer (DST): UTC+02:00 (CEST)
- Postal code: 9656
- SFOS number: 3351
- ISO 3166 code: CH-SG
- Surrounded by: Amden, Grabs, Nesslau-Krummenau, Quarten, Stein, Walenstadt, Wildhaus
- Website: www.altstjohann.ch

Alt St. Johann is a village in the Toggenburg region, since 2010 part of the municipality Wildhaus-Alt St.Johann in the canton of St. Gallen in Switzerland (the former municipalities of Alt St. Johann and Wildhaus merged on 1 January 2010).

== History ==
Aerial view (1964)

Alt St. Johann is historically the site of a monastery dedicated to Saint John the Baptist, first mentioned in 1152. Around 1200 castle Starkenstein was built by the counts of Werdenberg-Montfort. From 1414, the castle passed to the counts of Toggenburg, and after their extinction to St. Johann abbey. A village Sant Johann is first mentioned 1439. In 1626, St. Johann abbey was moved after a series of calamities to what is now Neu St. Johann near Nesslau; from this time, the village became known as Alt St. Johann ("Old Saint John's") to contrast with the new site of the monastery.

The municipalities of Alt St. Johann and Wildhaus merged into the municipality of Wildhaus-Alt St. Johann on 1 January 2010.

== Geography ==
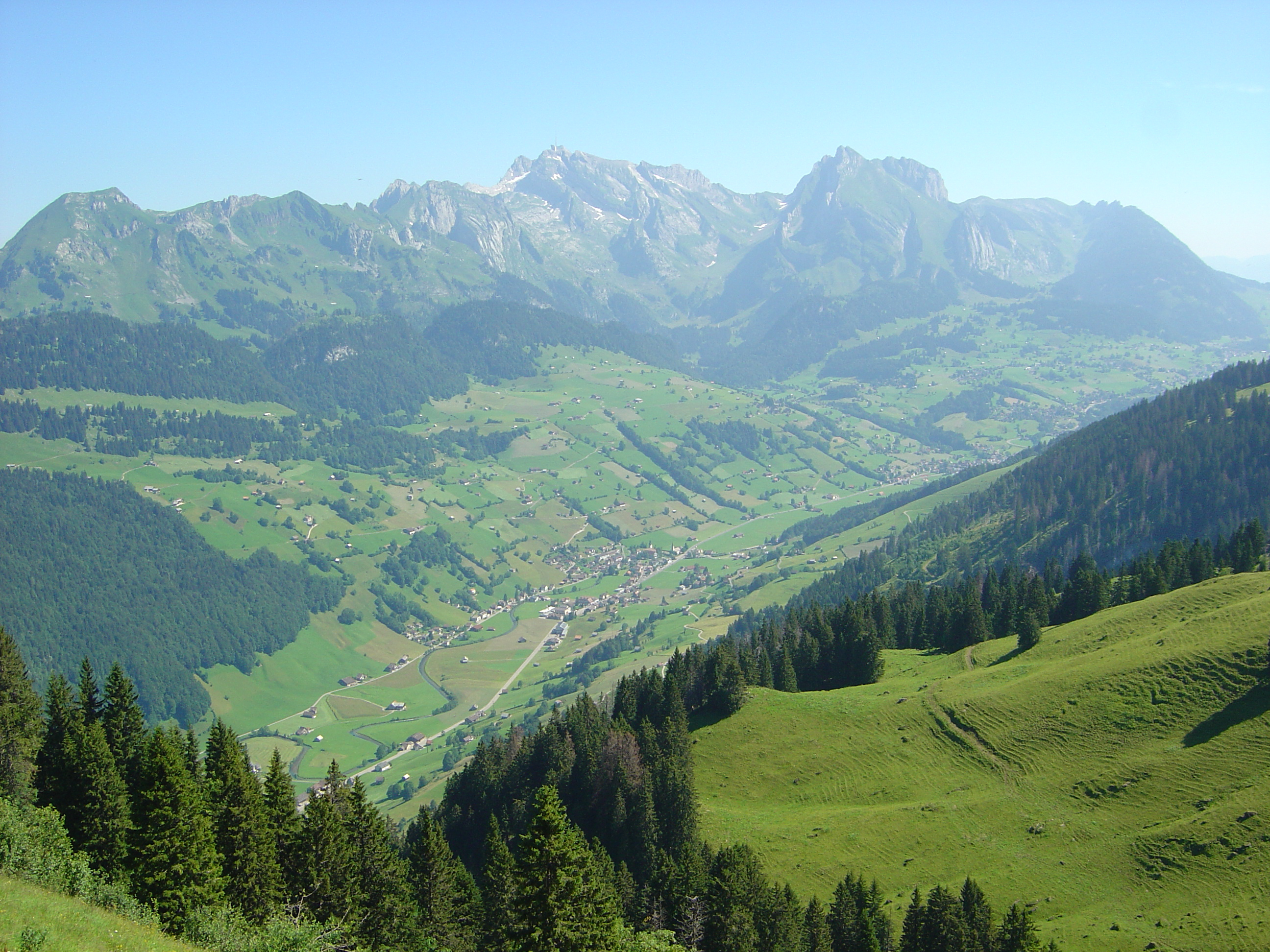
Alt St. Johann, and in the background the Säntis.

Alt St. Johann has an area, as of 2006, of 53.1 km^{2} (20.5 sq mi). Of this area, 54.7% is used for agricultural purposes, while 31.4% is forested. Of the rest of the land, 2.1% is settled (buildings or roads) and the remainder (11.8%) is non-productive (rivers or lakes). The municipalities of Alt St. Johann and Wildhaus merged on 1 January 2010 into the new municipality of Wildhaus-Alt St.Johann.

Until 2010, Alt St. Johann was a municipality in the Toggenburg constituency, consisting of the villages of Alt St. Johann and Unterwasser and the hamlet of Starkenbach on the valley floor. Higher up in the valley are scattered settlements on the valley sides as well as seasonal alpine settlements on the northern slope of the Churfirsten and into the Alpstein sub-range of the Appenzell Alps.

== Demographics ==
Alt St. Johann has a population (as of 2009) of 1466. As of 2007, about 9.4% of the population was made up of foreign nationals. Of the foreign population, (as of 2000), 19 are from Germany, 3 are from Italy, 91 are from ex-Yugoslavia, 8 are from Austria, and 37 are from another country. Over the last 10 years the population has decreased at a rate of -3.9%. Most of the population (as of 2000) speaks German (93.0%), with Serbo-Croatian being second most common ( 3.3%) and Albanian being third ( 1.4%). Of the Swiss national languages (as of 2000), 1,351 speak German, 3 people speak French, and 3 people speak Italian.

The age distribution, as of 2000, in Alt St. Johann is; 159 children or 10.9% of the population are between 0 and 9 years old and 252 teenagers or 17.3% are between 10 and 19. Of the adult population, 178 people or 12.3% of the population are between 20 and 29 years old. 196 people or 13.5% are between 30 and 39, 202 people or 13.9% are between 40 and 49, and 156 people or 10.7% are between 50 and 59. The senior population distribution is 123 people or 8.5% of the population are between 60 and 69 years old, 125 people or 8.6% are between 70 and 79, there are 55 people or 3.8% who are between 80 and 89, and there are 7 people or 0.5% who are between 90 and 99.

In 2000 there were 178 persons (or 12.3% of the population) who were living alone in a private dwelling. There were 273 (or 18.8%) persons who were part of a couple (married or otherwise committed) without children, and 832 (or 57.3%) who were part of a couple with children. There were 87 (or 6.0%) people who lived in single parent home, 2 persons who lived in a household made up of relatives, 5 who lived household made up of unrelated persons, and 76 who are either institutionalized or live in another type of collective housing.

In the 2007 federal election the most popular party was the SVP which received 36.8% of the vote. The next three most popular parties were the CVP (25.3%), the FDP (15.8%) and the SP (9.4%).

The entire Swiss population is generally well educated. In Alt St. Johann about 65.8% of the population (between age 25–64) have completed either non-mandatory upper secondary education or additional higher education (either University or a Fachhochschule). Out of the total population in Alt St. Johann, as of 2000, the highest education level completed by 374 people (25.7% of the population) was Primary, while 502 (34.5%) have completed their secondary education, 118 (8.1%) have attended a Tertiary school, and 74 (5.1%) are not in school. The remainder did not answer this question.

The historical population is given in the following table:

year	population
1827	1,618
1850	1,623
1900	1,504
1950	1,434
2000	1,453

== Heritage sites of national significance ==
The Paleolithic cave, Wildenmannlisloch is listed as a Swiss heritage site of national significance.

== Economy ==
As of 2007, Alt St. Johann had an unemployment rate of 0.78%. As of 2005, there were 164 people employed in the primary economic sector and about 66 businesses involved in this sector. 151 people are employed in the secondary sector and there are 26 businesses in this sector. 448 people are employed in the tertiary sector, with 80 businesses in this sector.

As of October 2009 the average unemployment rate was 1.0%. There were 167 businesses in the municipality of which 25 were involved in the secondary sector of the economy while 75 were involved in the third.

As of 2000 there were 505 residents who worked in the municipality, while 261 residents worked outside Alt St. Johann and 151 people commuted into the municipality for work.

== Religion ==
From the 2000 census, 681 or 46.9% are Roman Catholic, while 531 or 36.5% belonged to the Swiss Reformed Church. Of the rest of the population, there are 3 individuals (or about 0.21% of the population) who belong to the Christian Catholic faith, there are 33 individuals (or about 2.27% of the population) who belong to the Orthodox Church, and there are 6 individuals (or about 0.41% of the population) who belong to another Christian church. There is 1 individual who is Jewish, and 59 (or about 4.06% of the population) who are Islamic. There are 2 individuals (or about 0.14% of the population) who belong to another church (not listed on the census), 79 (or about 5.44% of the population) belong to no church, are agnostic or atheist, and 58 individuals (or about 3.99% of the population) did not answer the question.
