= Cilander =

Swiss textile finishing company

Cilander AG
- Formerly: Tribelhorn & Meyer (1823–1888)
- Type: Joint-stock company
- Industry: Textile finishing
- Founded: 1814 (as a fulling mill)
- Defunct: 2024
- Headquarters: Herisau, Switzerland
- Products: Finished textiles
- Number of employees: ~1,000 (1920s); 151 (2000)

Cilander was a Swiss textile finishing company in the canton of Appenzell Ausserrhoden. It originated in 1814 as a fulling mill and became a leading firm in eastern Switzerland's textile finishing industry. The company ceased its operations in 2024.

== History ==
The company originated in 1814 as a fulling mill and was known from 1823 to 1888 as Tribelhorn & Meyer. Around 1870 an innovative management made it the flagship of the sector in Eastern Switzerland, and a branch was built at Flawil in 1868. From 1869 the combination of Scottish and French finishing processes produced exceptional results. A joint-stock company from 1873, the firm took the name Cilander in 1888. Together with the Heberlein firm at Wattwil, it played a decisive role in the introduction of mercerizing after 1890.

From 1912 the company developed chemical finishing processes—to obtain transparency and opalescence—that gave it an unprecedented expansion. Its workforce in the 1920s amounted to some 1,000 employees, of which 151 remained in 2000. After 1983 the company began to treat not only cotton but all textile fibers, which allowed it to reach the front rank of the Swiss plain-fabric finishing industry. In 1997 it was the first firm in the world to receive the Eco-Tex 1000 ecological label.

In January 2024, the company announced that the company would cease operations completely in August 2024.

== Bibliography ==
- W. Schläpfer, Wirtschaftsgeschichte des Kantons Appenzell Ausserrhoden bis 1939, 1984, 184–185, 307–310, 383
- Holderegger, Unternehmer, 190–191, 214, 252, 372, 375, 463, 510
- Appenzeller Zeitung, 28 October 1997
