= List of waterfalls in Switzerland =

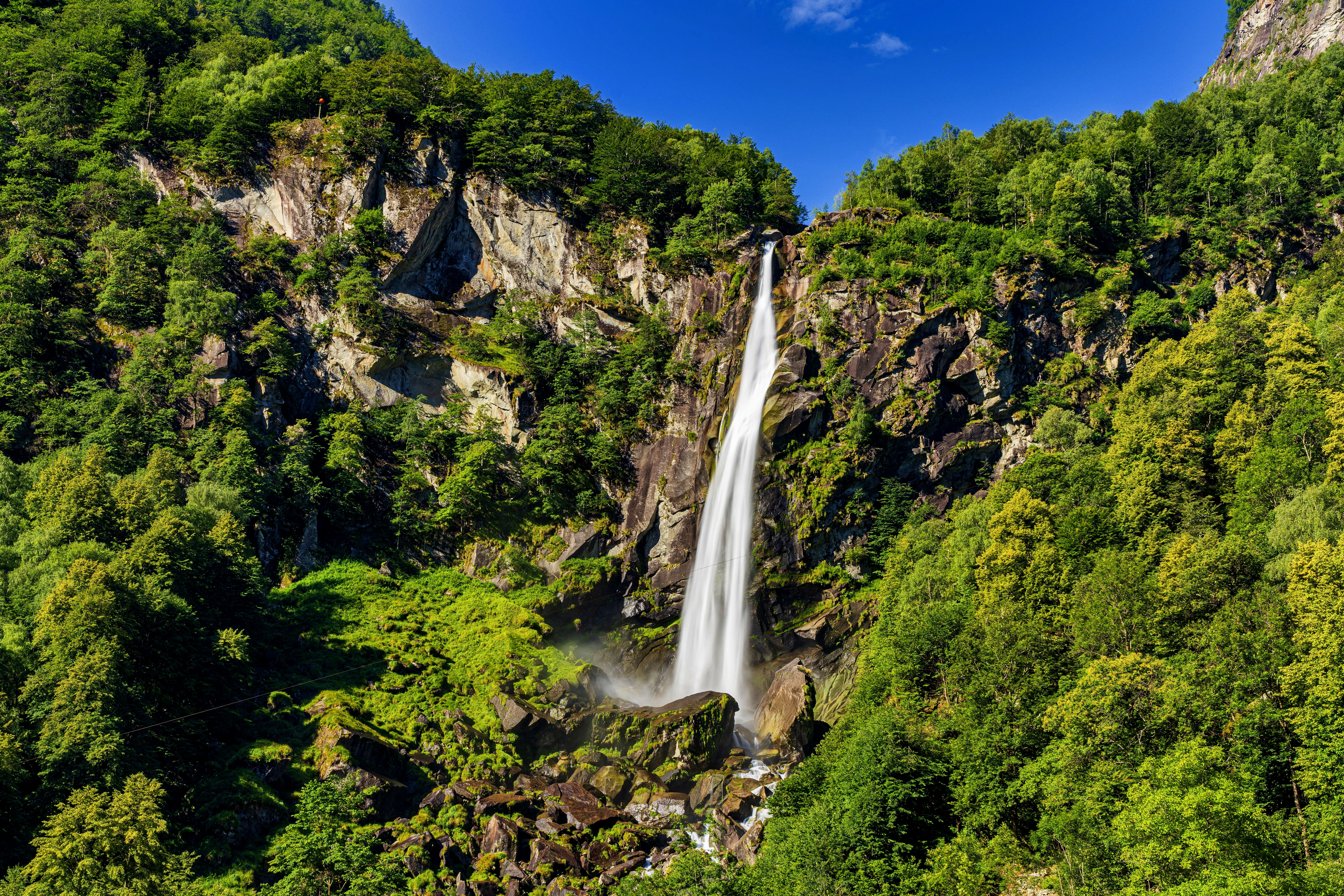
Foroglio Falls

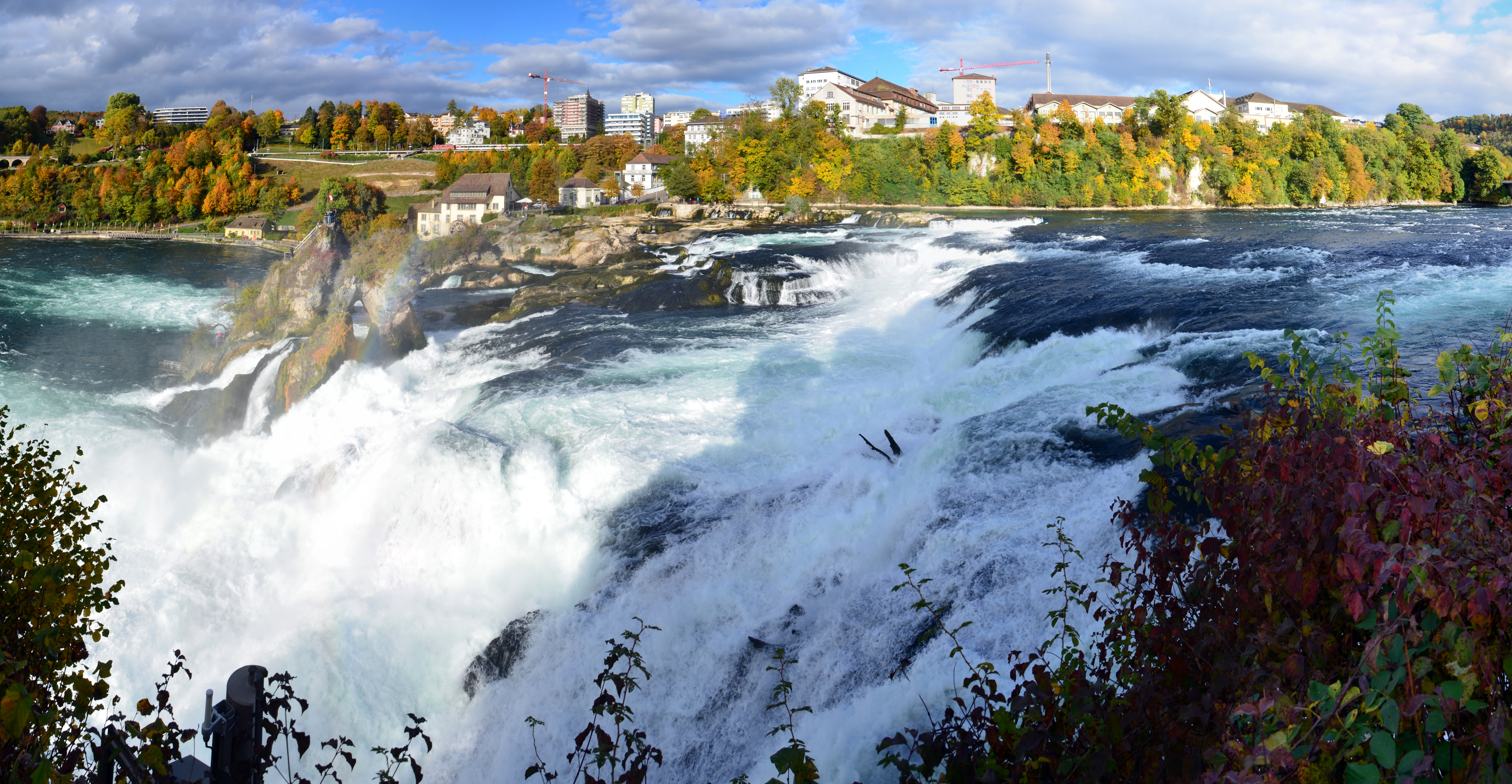
Rhine Falls

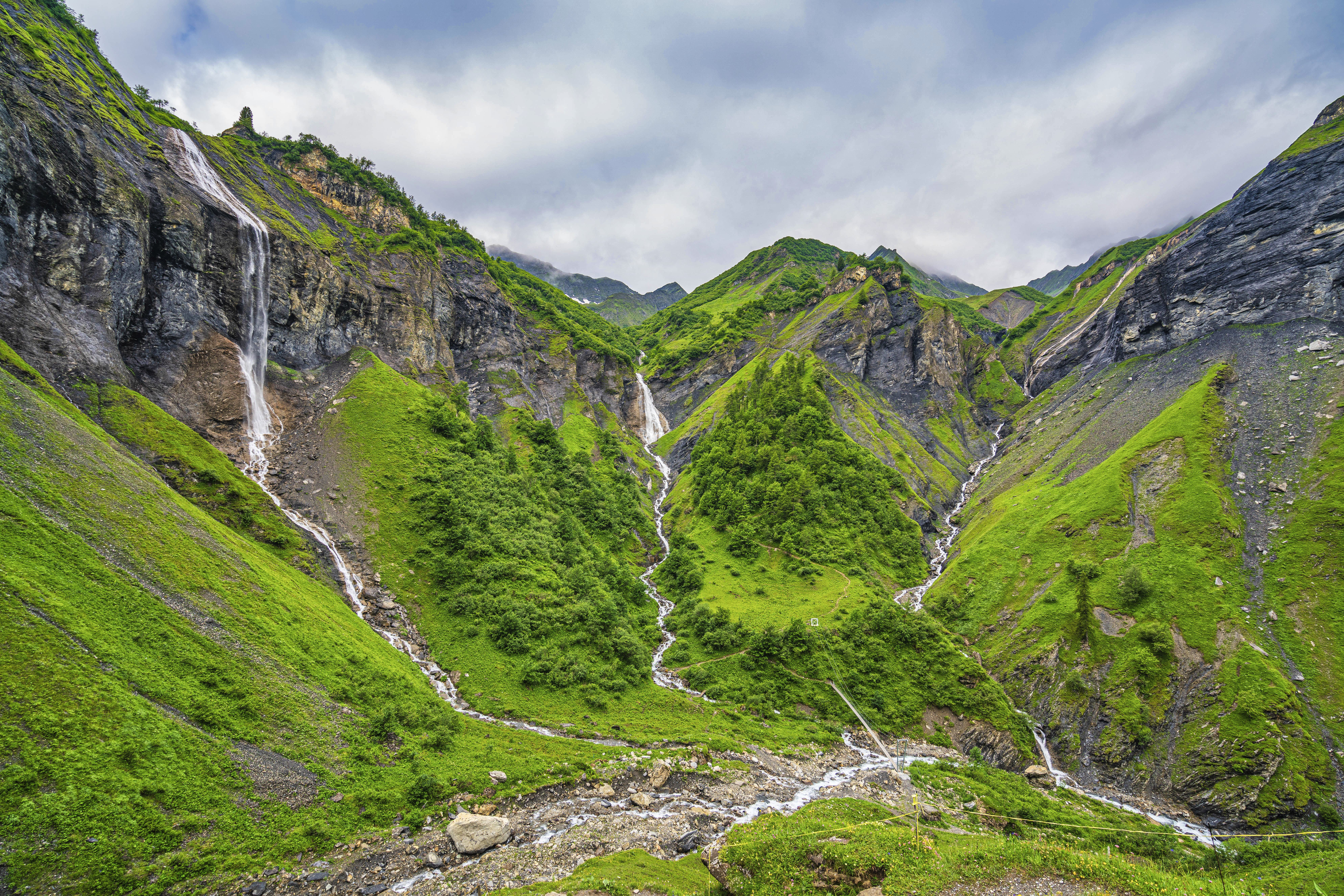
Batöni waterfalls arena

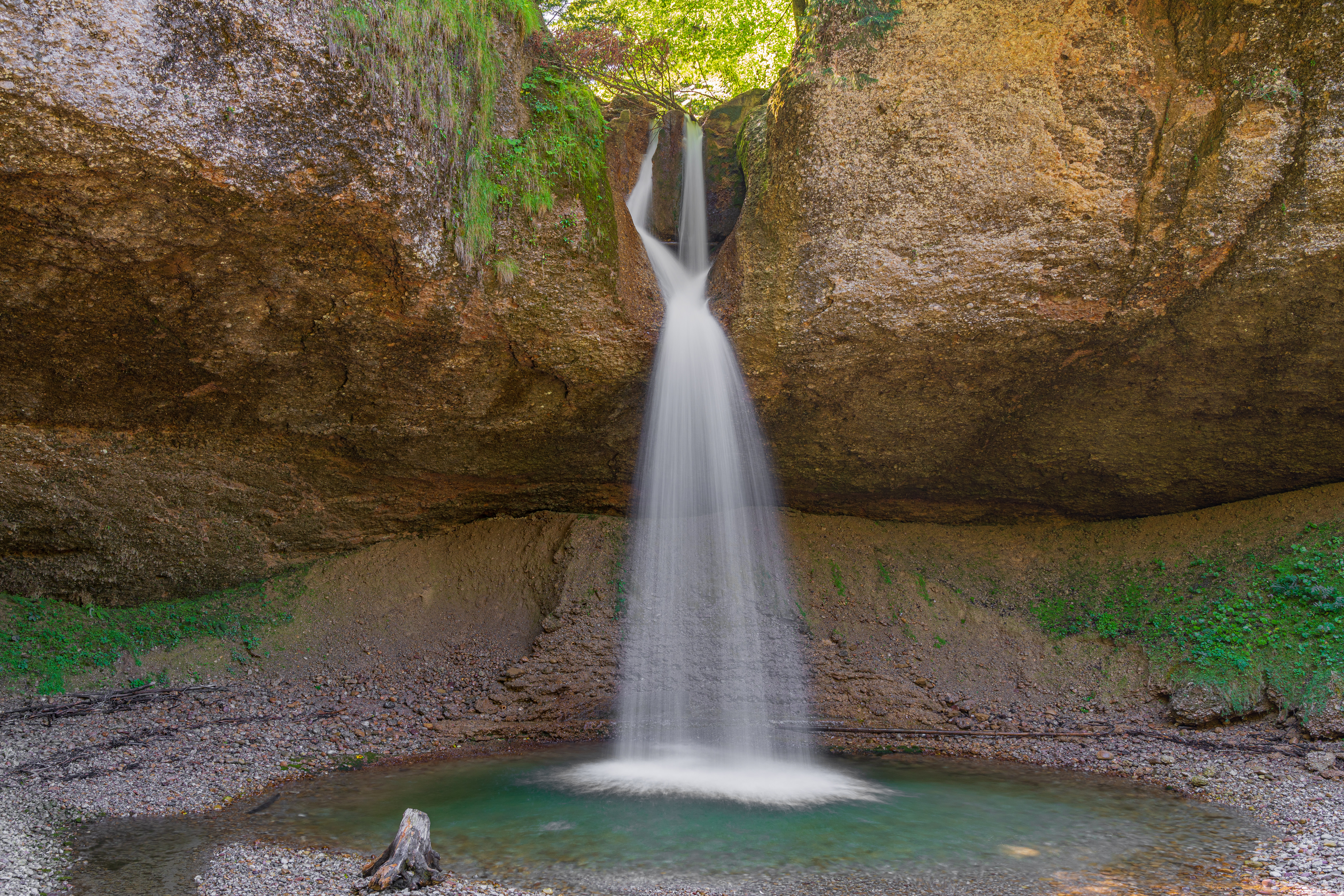
Lauf waterfall

This is a sortable list of named waterfalls in Switzerland. Europe's largest waterfall, the Rhine Falls (Rheinfall), is located in Switzerland. Due to the country's mostly mountainous terrain (Alps, Jura), numerous creeks and rivers form waterfalls along their course, of which at least 150 are named.

Name/Native name	Location	Canton(s)	Notes
Rhine Falls; Rheinfall	Neuhausen am Rheinfall, Laufen-Uhwiesen	Schaffhausen, Zurich	Largest waterfall in Europe, 150 m (490 ft) wide, 23 m (75 ft) high, located on the High Rhine near the town of Schaffhausen
Mürrenbach Fall; Mürrenbachfall	Lauterbrunnental	Bern	Highest waterfall in Switzerland, with 417 m (1,368 ft)
Batöni Falls; Batöni Wasserfall Arena	Weisstannen	St. Gallen	
Bernina Falls; Cascada da Bernina	Morteratsch	Grisons	Located near St. Moritz in Engadin
Berschner Falls; Berschnerfall	Berschis	St. Gallen	Located near Flums in the Seez Valley
Buri waterfall Wasserfall Buri	Fischenthal	Zurich	Located along the river Töss in the Zürcher Oberland
Diesbach Falls; Diesbachfall	Diesbach	Glarus	
Doubs Falls; Saut du Doubs	Le Locle	Neuchâtel	Located along the river Doubs on the France-Switzerland border (Doubs department of France)
Engstligen Falls; Engstligenfälle	Adelboden	Bern	
Feldbach Falls; Feldbachfall	Wattwil	St. Gallen	Located on the Feldbach, west of Wattwil and north to Iberg Castle, in the Toggenburg region
Foroglio Falls; Cascata di Foroglio	Foroglio	Ticino	Located in the Bavona Valley (Val Bavona)
Giessbach Falls; Giessbachfälle	Brienz	Bern	Located on the river Aare
Lauf waterfall Wasserfall Lauf	Fischenthal	Zurich	Located along the river Töss in the Zürcher Oberland
Grotte aux Fées waterfall Cascade de la grotte aux Fées	Saint-Maurice	Valais	Located in a cave
Môtiers Falls; Cascade de Môtiers	Môtiers	Neuchâtel	
Mutzbach Falls; Mutzbachfall	Riedtwil	Bern	Located near Seeberg
Pigniu Falls; Cascata da Pigniu	Pigniu	Grisons	Located near Ilanz in the Vorderrhein Valley
Piumogna Falls; Cascata Piumogna	Faido	Ticino	
Reichenbach Falls; Reichenbachfälle	Meiringen	Bern	World famous thanks to Sherlock Holmes
Roffla Falls; Rofflafall	Andeer	Grisons	
Salto Falls; Cascata del Salto	Maggia	Ticino	
Seerenbach Falls; Seerenbachfälle	Amden	St. Gallen	Located next to Lake Walen, adjacent to the Rin Spring
Staubbach Falls; Staubbachfall	Lauterbrunnen	Bern	
Thur waterfalls Thurfälle	Unterwasser	St. Gallen	Located near the source of the Thur in the Toggenburg region
Trümmelbach Falls; Trümmelbachfälle	Lauterbrunnen	Bern	
Wissengubel Falls; Wissengubel-Giessen	Gibswil	Zurich	Located near the source of the river Jona in the Zürcher Oberland

== See also ==
- Geography of Switzerland
- List of waterfalls
