= Birnstiel =

German surname

Birnstiel is a German surname. Notable people with the surname include:

- Friedrich Wilhelm Birnstiel, German music publisher
- Johann Georg Birnstiel (1858–1927), Swiss clergyman and writer
