= Adlung =

Adlung is a surname. Notable people with the surname include:

- Daniel Adlung (born 1987), German footballer
- Jakob Adlung (1699–1762), German classical organist, composer, teacher, instrument maker, music historian, and music theorist
