= Staubbach Falls =

Waterfall in Switzerland

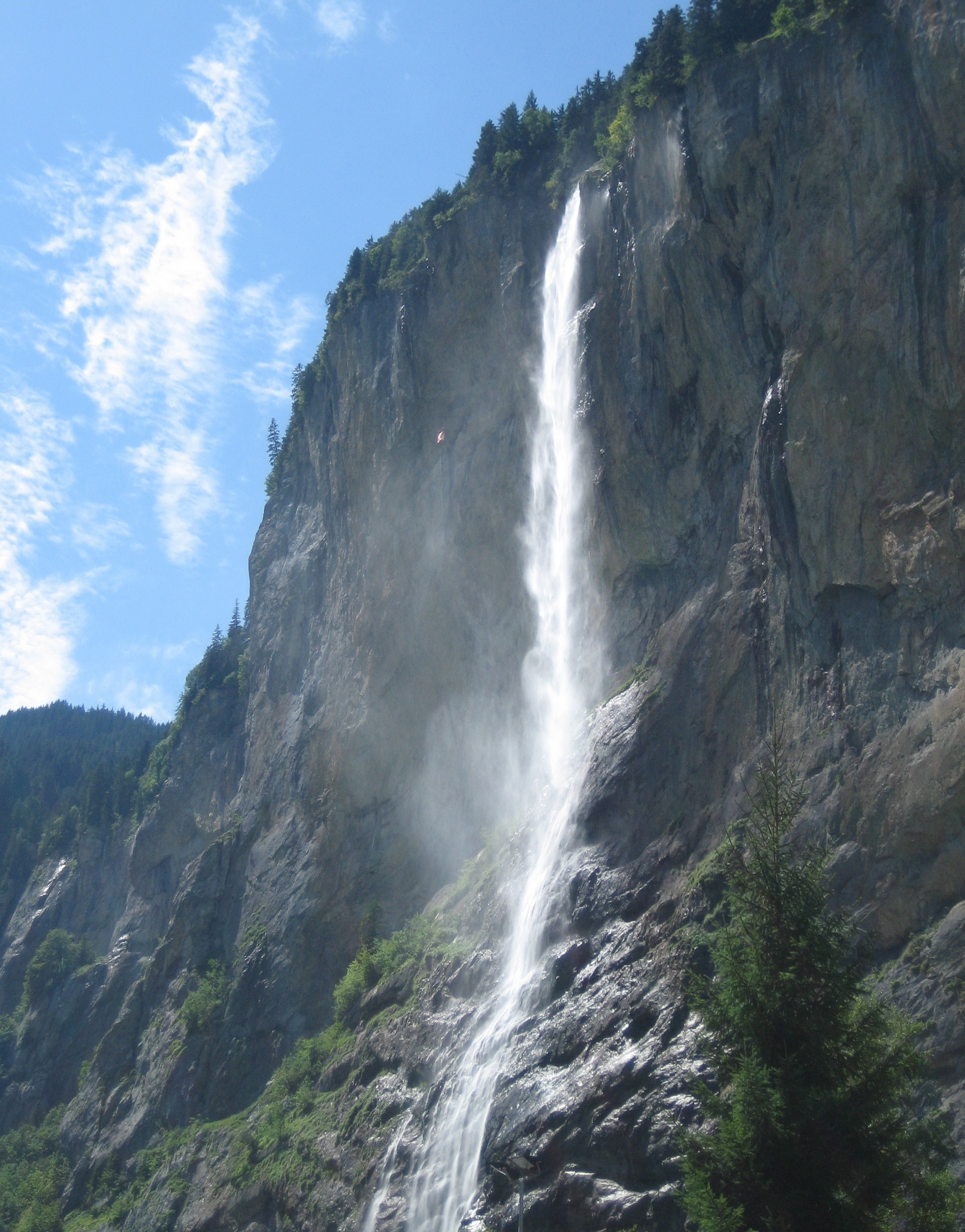
- Staubbach Falls

- Location within Switzerland Location within Canton of Bern
- Location: West of Lauterbrunnen in the Bernese Highlands
- Coordinates: 46.58965°N 7.905505°E
- Total height: 297 metres (974 feet)

Staubbach Falls (German: Staubbachfall (sing.), lit.: dust creek fall) is a waterfall in Switzerland, located just west of Lauterbrunnen in the Bernese Highlands. The waterfall drops 297 metres (974 feet) from a hanging valley that ends in overhanging cliffs above the Weisse Lütschine.

The stream forms a cascade high enough that it is generally almost lost in spray before it reaches the level of the valley. After rain, and early in the season when fed by melting snow, the flow rate is highest. The force of the stream above the fall at such times is sufficient to carry the water clear of the precipice. In a dry summer, when the supply of water is much reduced, the effect is comparatively insignificant.

A visit by Johann Wolfgang von Goethe in 1779 provided the inspiration for his poem "Gesang der Geister über den Wassern".

The falls were featured on the 3-centime Swiss postage stamp of the 1930s.

There are other waterfalls in the Lauterbrunnen valley, including the Mürrenbach Falls, Switzerland's highest waterfall, and the Trümmelbach Falls.

== Transport ==
There is a PostAuto bus route from Lauterbrunnen railway station to near the bottom of the waterfall.

== See also ==
- List of waterfalls
- List of waterfalls in Switzerland
- Tourism in Switzerland
