= Gesang der Geister über den Wassern =

1789 poem written by Johann Wolfgang von Goethe

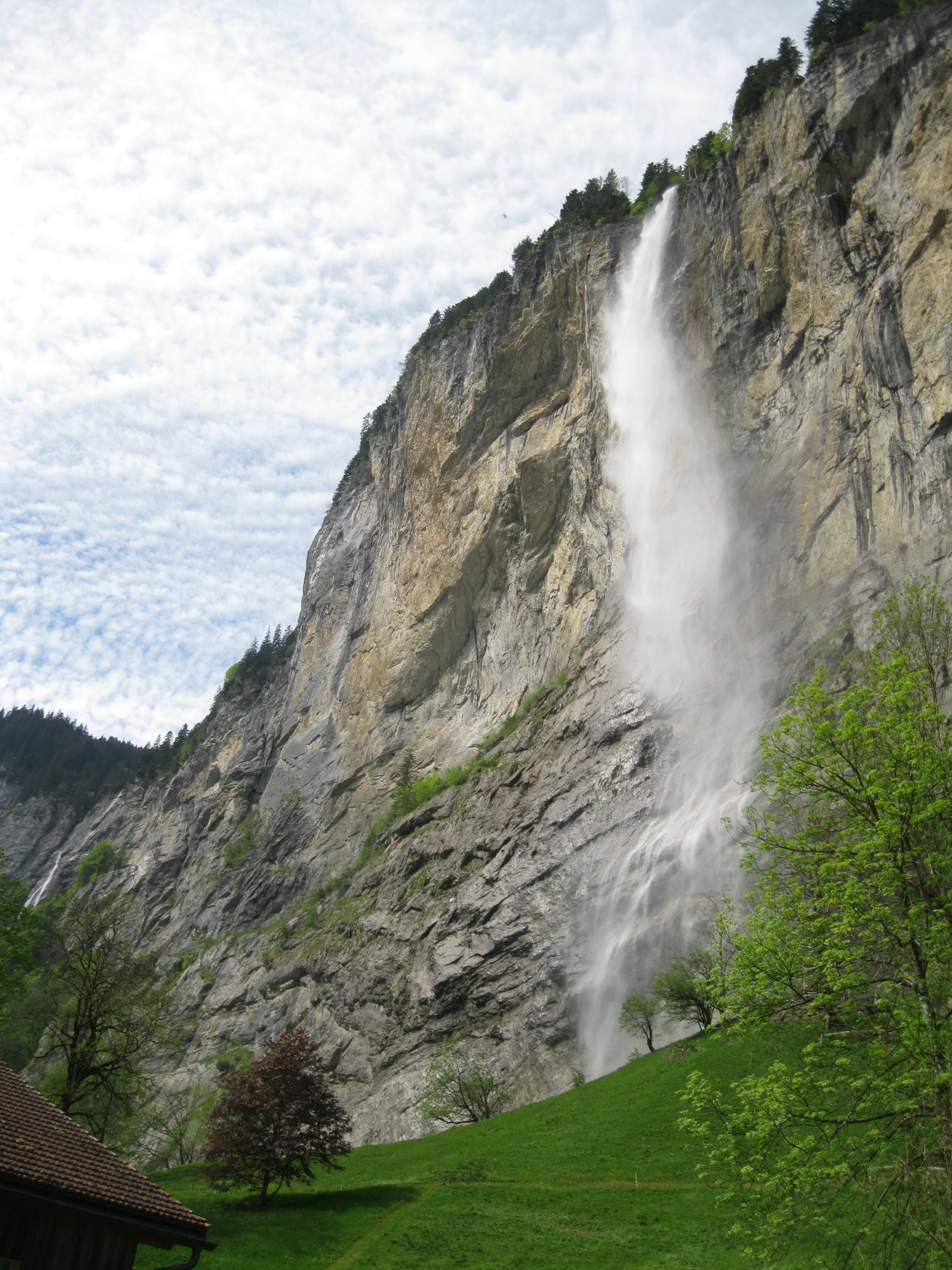
Staubbach Falls, Lauterbrunnental

"Gesang der Geister über den Wassern" (transl. Song of the Spirits over the Waters) is a 1779 poem by Johann Wolfgang von Goethe (1749–1832). It may be best known in the English-speaking world through a musical setting of 1820–21 by Franz Schubert (1797–1828) as a part song for men's voices and low strings (D.714).

== The poem ==
In 1776, Goethe settled in Weimar, seat of the Duchy of Saxe-Weimar, and a centre of the intellectual movement known as the Age of Enlightenment. In 1779, he embarked upon his second tour of Switzerland, this time accompanying his employer Duke Karl August (1757–1828). From 9 to 11 October, the party visited the area around Lauterbrunnen, in the Bernese Oberland. Goethe was impressed by the sight of the Staubbach Falls, which cascade down a sheer rock face 300 m (980 ft) high. He was motivated to write a first version of this poem, with the title "Gesang der lieblichen Geister in der Wüste" (transl. Song of the Lovely Spirits in the Desert). He sent it to Charlotte von Stein (1742–1827), lady-in-waiting at the ducal court and a close friend to and influence on Goethe.

In 1789, he revised the poem for publication in one of his volumes of collected writings. He gave it the title it now bears, made minor modifications to the wording, and changed its form from a dialogue between two spirits speaking alternately to a monologue. The poem is 35 lines long, mostly of four or five syllables, and is divided into six stanzas of uneven length. It is without either rhymes or strong rhythm. Goethe compares the soul of man to water cycles between Heaven and Earth. It gushes over a high cliff and breaks among the rocks. It flows through grassy meadows to a lake where the stars see their reflection. Wind is the water's lover, stirring it into restlessness. The soul of man is like the water, and the destiny of man is like the wind.

"Gesang der Geister" has been contrasted with "Mahomets Gesang" (transl. Mahomet's Song), a 1772–73 poem by Goethe which describes the course of an idealised river from a mountain spring to the ocean. Both poems are examples of Sturm und Drang ("Storm and Stress"), a German proto-Romantic aesthetic movement with an emphasis on subjective experience. Victor Hehn interpreted "Gesang der Geister" as an extended Romantic metaphor, in which the repeated ascent and descent of water between Heaven and Earth represents man's attempt to grasp both the mundane and the eternal, and the contrast between the restless cascade and the tranquil lake is between stormy passions and calm reflection, in a kind of mysticism or pantheism where these opposites blend to form a natural whole. Peter Härtling suggested that the poem could be read in the context of an attempted distancing by Goethe from Charlotte von Stein. Terence James Reed thought that the wind symbolises the psychological disturbance caused by love.

== Musical settings ==
=== Overview ===
This section is arranged chronologically. The D-numbers of the Schubert settings are the Deutsch catalogue numbers.

- Franz Schubert, D.484. 1st setting; 1816. Voice and piano. Fragment.
- Franz Schubert, D.538. 2nd setting; 1817. Two tenors and two basses.
- Franz Schubert, [D.704]. 4th setting, 1st version; 1820. Four tenors, four basses, two violas, two violoncellos and double bass. Fragment. Renumbered into D.714.
- Franz Schubert, D.705. 3rd setting; 1820. Two tenors, two basses and piano. Sketch.
- Franz Schubert, D.714. 4th setting, 2nd version; 1820–21. Four tenors, four basses, two violas, two violoncellos and double bass.
- Bernhard Klein (1793-1832), Op. 42. 1840? Male voice choir (two tenor parts, two bass parts). This piece was performed in Berlin in 1852 and in San Antonio, Texas in 1853.
- Carl Loewe (1796-1869), Op. 88. 1840. Soprano, alto, tenor, bass, and piano. Max Runze, Loewe's editor, said that this song was performed too rarely in public, and that it seemed detached from earthly things, but rather to consist of ethereal sounds. Pianist Graham Johnson described it as "charming without being untrue to the profound spirit of the text".
- Ferdinand Hiller (1811-1885), Op. 36. 1847. Mixed chorus and orchestra.
- Hermann Reutter (1900-1985), Op. 52. 1939. Soprano and baritone soloists, mixed chorus and orchestra.
- Aurel Stroe (1932-2008). 1999. High voice, clarinet and piano.

=== Schubert's settings ===
Schubert made several attempts to set the poem between 1816 and 1821, and completed three of them. His first version, D.484, is for voice and piano, and has survived only as a fragment, which music critic Richard Capell called "a grievous relic ... mutilated by chance". His second version, D.538, is a part song for male voices. It was written in 1817, and first published in 1891. A typical performance takes about 6½ minutes. His third and final version, D.714, is a part song for male voices and low strings. It was completed in 1821, and first published as his Op. posth. 167 in 1858, thirty years after his death. A typical performance takes about 10 or 11 minutes. The forces are unusual, and it is not often performed; but it has been recorded more than twenty times. It is the best-known of all settings of the poem, and has been much admired. Capell called it "one of Schubert's greatest choral works". Norwegian pianist Leif Ove Andsnes has said that it is "one of [Schubert's] most magical pieces", and also that "[i]t should be listened to only at night, and will make you feel as if you are the last person in the universe".
