= Gurit Holding AG =

Swiss composite materials company

- Formerly: Gurit-Heberlein AG (until 2006)
- Type: Aktiengesellschaft
- Industry: Composite materials
- Founded: 1835 (as a yarn dyeing works)
- Founder: Georg Philipp Heberlein
- Headquarters: Wattwil, Switzerland
- Products: High-performance composite materials, structural foams, balsa, prepregs, adhesives, resins, wind-blade tooling and kitting
- Revenue: SFr 460 million (2023)
- Number of employees: 2,343 (2023)
- Website: www.gurit.com

Gurit (formally Gurit Holding AG, until April 2006 Gurit-Heberlein AG) is a Swiss industrial company based in Wattwil, specializing in the development and manufacture of high-performance composite materials. It grew out of a yarn dyeing works founded by Georg Philipp Heberlein in 1835 and shifted over time from textiles toward chemicals and synthetic materials, taking its present form when the Gurit-Heberlein group was split in two in 2006.

The company is listed on the SIX Swiss Exchange under the ticker GUR.

== Operations ==
As a supplier, Gurit develops and manufactures high-performance composite materials, particularly for the wind power industry, for transport applications (rail and boatbuilding), and in mold-making and automation for the production of wind turbine rotor blades ("tooling") and kitting services. Its material range includes core materials such as structural foams and balsa wood, fiber-reinforced plastics (prepregs), adhesives, resins, and consumables, complemented in the marine sector by engineering services. Since 2010 it has also been a leading supplier of molds for the manufacture of wind turbine rotor blades.

== History ==
The business originated in a yarn dyeing works founded by Georg Philipp Heberlein in 1835. The second generation of owners moved it from artisanal to industrial production and introduced artificial dyes, while the third generation took up the caustic-soda treatment of cotton yarn (mercerizing) in 1897 and piece dyeing and fabric printing in 1916. The firm was converted into a joint-stock company in 1915. Growing rapidly—from 45 employees in 1896 to 1,217 in 1925—Heberlein acquired the Neue Schweizer Kattundruckerei at Richterswil in 1927, closed it in 1929, and replaced it with the Gummiwerke Richterswil (rubber factory) that traded under the name Gurit.

After the Second World War the company moved into the texturing of synthetic fibers—a process that crimps filament to produce stretchy, bulkier yarn—which it marketed under the brand Helanca. The process was patented worldwide and the firm set up its own machine manufacturing. In the late 1960s it diversified into chemicals and plastics, taking over the dental products firm Coltène at Altstätten in 1967, the Arova textile group (based in Flurlingen) in 1969, and the celluloid sheet maker Worbla at Ittigen in 1973. In 1968 Gurit set up a joint venture, Gurit-Essex, at Freienbach with the American chemical group Essex Chemical, which subsequently specialized in adhesives for the automotive industry. With 5,260 employees and a turnover of 330 million francs in 1970, the group withdrew during the 1970s from the collapsed market for textured products, and its restructuring required substantial support from the banks.

The holding company Gurit-Heberlein was created in 1984. The group's transformation from textiles to chemicals and synthetic materials was completed in 1999 with the separation of Heberlein Textiles, which was closed entirely in 2001. In 2000 Gurit-Heberlein sold its 50% stake in Gurit-Essex to the Dow Chemical Company, which had become the majority shareholder of Essex Chemical.

In 2006 the Gurit-Heberlein group was split into two companies: Gurit (high-performance composite materials) and Medisize (medical and dental products). In 2009 Gurit acquired the Chinese wind-blade mold maker Suzhou Red Maple Wind Blade Mould Co. Ltd. In 2018 the acquisition of JSB Group added a globally active core-material kitting service for the wind turbine industry.

== Bibliography ==
- 100 Jahre Heberlein 1835–1935, 1935
- Heberlein 1835–1960, 1960
- H. Büchler, ed., Wattwil, 1997, 169–177
