= Johann Friedrich Agricola =

German composer, organist, singer, pedagogue, and writer

Johann Friedrich Agricola (4 January 1720 – 2 December 1774) was a German composer, organist, singer, pedagogue, and writer on music. He sometimes wrote under the pseudonym Flavio Anicio Olibrio.

== Biography ==
Agricola was born in Dobitschen, Thuringia.

=== Leipzig ===
While a student of law at Leipzig (1738–41) he studied music under Johann Sebastian Bach.

=== Berlin ===
In 1741 Agricola went to Berlin, where he studied musical composition under Johann Joachim Quantz. He was soon generally recognized as one of the most skillful organists of his time. The success of his comic opera, Il filosofo convinto in amore, performed at Potsdam in 1750, led to an appointment as court composer to Frederick the Great. In 1759, on the death of Carl Heinrich Graun, he was appointed conductor of the royal orchestra. He married the noted court operatic soprano Benedetta Emilia Molteni, despite the king's prohibition of court employees marrying each other. Because of this trespass, the king reduced Molteni's and Agricola's combined salaries to a single annual salary of 1,000 Thalers (Agricola's annual salary alone had been 1,500 Thalers). Agricola died in Berlin at age 54.

== Legacy ==
Agricola wrote a number of Italian operas, as well as Lieder, chorale preludes, various other keyboard pieces and church music, especially oratorios and cantatas. His reputation chiefly rests, however, on his theoretical and critical writings on musical subjects.

=== Author ===
In 1754 he co-authored, with Carl Philipp Emanuel Bach, J. S. Bach's obituary. His 1757 Anleitung zur Singekunst (Introduction to the Art of Singing) is a translation of Pier Francesco Tosi's 1723 treatise Opinioni de' cantori antichi e moderni with Agricola's own extensive comments. He edited and added extensive commentary to the 1768 (posthumous) edition of Jakob Adlung's Musica mechanica organoedi (English translation). His annotations are considered an important source of information on J. S. Bach's views on the fortepiano designs of Gottfried Silbermann, on the lute-harpsichord, and on organ building.

=== Copyist ===
Agricola is also noted in Bach studies as one of the copyists for both books of the Well-Tempered Clavier and the St. Matthew Passion.

=== Composer ===
==== Keyboard ====
- Ach, was soll ich Sünder machen
- Jauchzet, ihr Erlösten dem Herren
- Harpsichord Sonata in F major

==== Organ ====
- Jesu, meine Freude
- Ein feste Burg ist unser Gott
- Auf meinen lieben Gott
- Erbarm dich mein, o Herre Gott
- Es ist das Heil uns kommen her
- Jauchzt, ihr Erlösten, dem Herren
- O Ewigkeit, du Donnerwort
- Herr, ich habe mißgehandelt
- Herr Jesu Christ, ich weiß gar wohl
- Wer nur den lieben Gott läßt walten
- Ach, was soll ich Sünder machen
- O Traurigkeit, o Herzeleid
- Keinen hat Gott verlassen
- Herzliebster Jesu, was hast du verbrochen
- Freu dich sehr, o meine Seele
- Ich hab mein Sach Gott heimgestellt

==== Chamber works ====
- Flute Sonata in A major

==== Vocal works ====
- A la mignonne de fortune (song)
- L'accorto nocchiero (aria)
- Canzonetta, Les Rois d'Égypte
- 6 Canzonettes
- Cleofide
- Torna aprile e l'aure scherzano (aria)

==== Choral works ====
- Die Hirten bei der Krippe, cantata for 4 voices, chorus & orchestra
- Kündlich gross ist das gottselige Geheimnis, cantata for 4 voices, chorus & orchestra
- Uns ist ein Kind geboren, cantata for 4 voices, chorus & orchestra
- Die Hirten bey der Krippe zu Bethlehem, sacred cantata
- Der König jauchzt, sacred cantata
- Il tempio d'amore, serenata
- Magnificat in D major

==== Opera ====
- Alessandro nell'Indie (1754)
- Achille in Sciro, (1765)
- L'Ippocondriaco
