= Seerenbach Falls =

Waterfalls near Walensee (Lake Walen) in Switzerland

Seerenbach and Rinquelle Falls
- German: Seerenbachfälle und Rinquellenfall
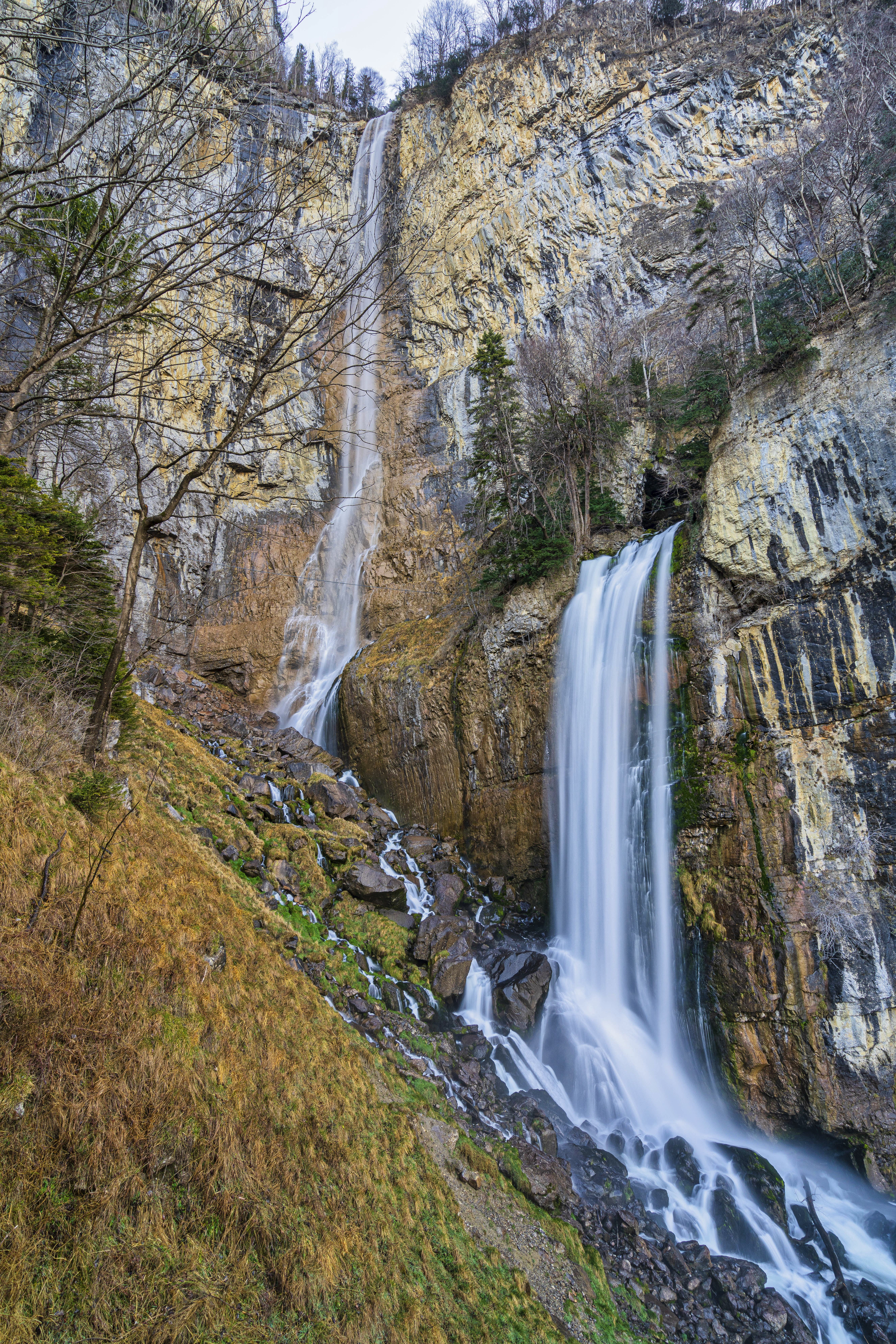
- Seerenbach Fall III (left) and Rinquelle Fall (right)

- Location within Switzerland Location within Canton of St. Gallen
- Interactive map of Seerenbach and Rinquelle Falls
- Location: Amden
- Coordinates: 47.138094°N 9.165063°E
- Type: Cascade waterfall
- Total height: Seerenbach Fall I: 50 m (160 ft), Seerenbach Fall II: 305 m (1,001 ft), Seerenbach Fall 3: 190 m (620 ft), Rhinquelle Fall: 48 metres (157 ft)
- Number of drops: 3 (+1)
- Watercourse: Seerenbach

The Seerenbach Falls (German: Seerenbachfälle) are a cascading set of three waterfalls east of Betlis in the municipality of Amden (canton of St. Gallen, Switzerland). The waterfalls form a creek, the Seerenbach (lit. 'Seeren Creek'), which drains into Lake Walen (Walensee). The Rinquelle (English: Rin Spring) joins the lowest of the Seerenbach Falls, creating a fourth one (English: Rinquelle Falls or German: Rinquellenfall).

== Cascades ==
The waterfalls are numbered Seerenbach Falls I, II and III from top to bottom. The upper cascade has a height of 50 m (160 ft), the middle one of 305 m (1,001 ft), and the lower one of 190 m (620 ft), for a total of 585 m (1,919 ft). Seerenbach Falls II are the second-highest waterfall in Switzerland, after the Mürrenbach Fall, with a height of 417 m (1,368 ft) (in terms of water volume, the Rhine Falls are the largest in Switzerland).

== Rinquelle ==
The Rinquelle is a karst spring that joins Seerenbach Fall III in the Seerenbach canyon. Behind it, there is a river cave system that was explored between 1953 and 1981. The waterfall of the Rinquelle is 48 m (157 ft) high.

== Transport ==
The waterfalls are a popular site on the hiking trail from Weesen to Quinten. Quinten can be reached by a ferry from Murg (with connecting trains at Murg railway station) and by boat lines of the Schiffsbetrieb Walensee from any other lakeside town. Weesen is linked by a bus line to Ziegelbrücke railway station.

== Gallery ==
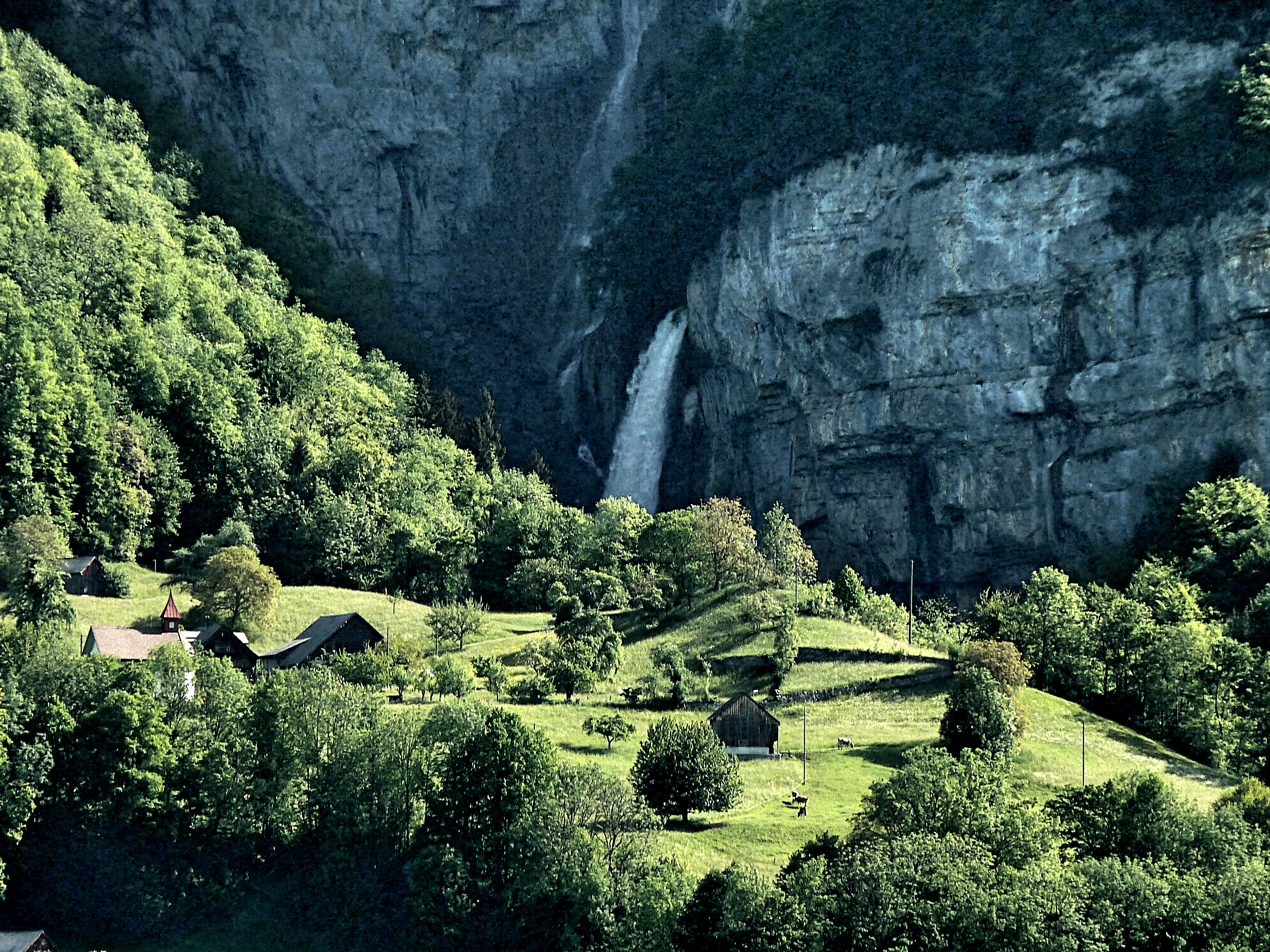
Seerenbach and Rinquelle Falls

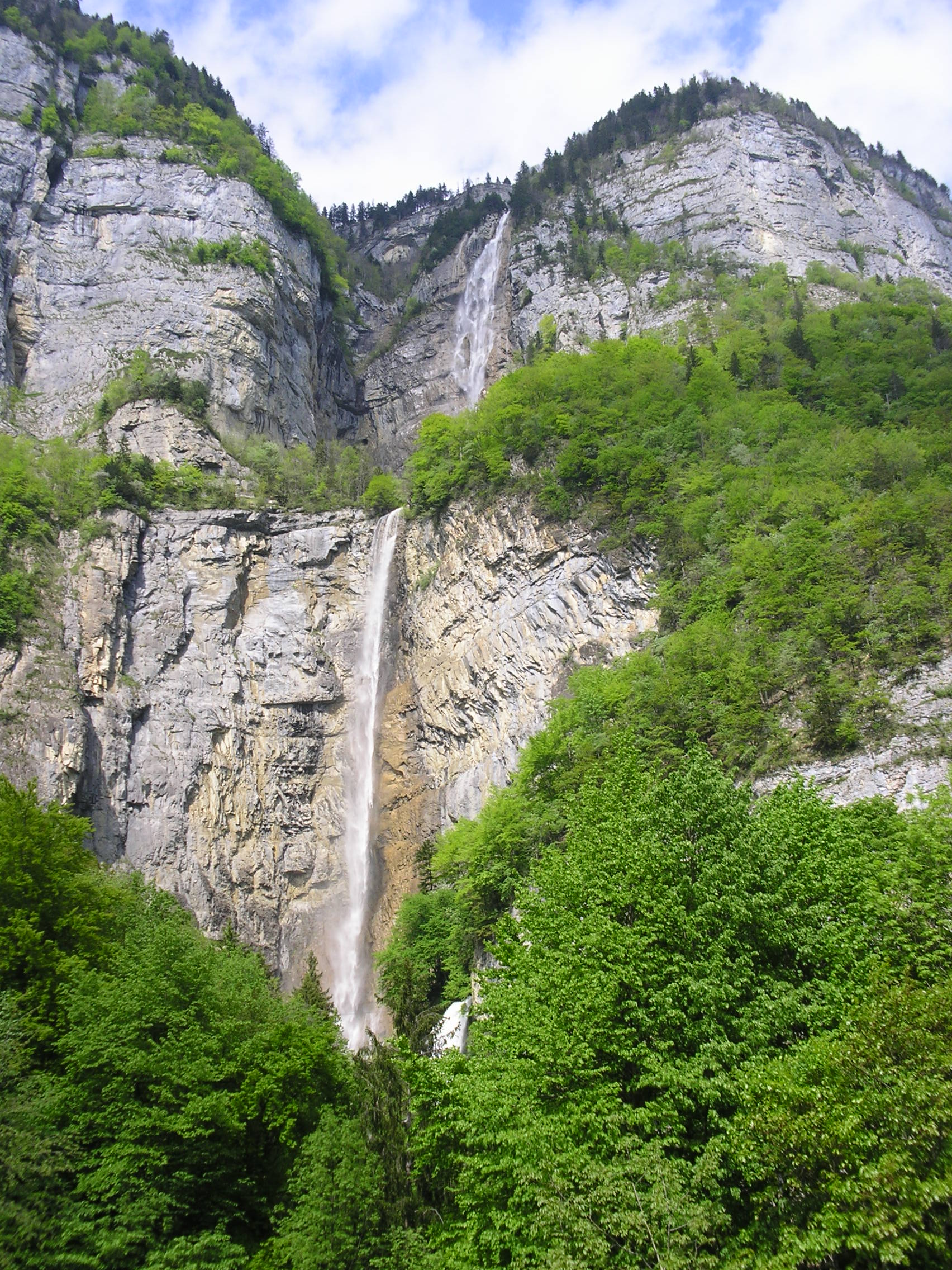
Seerenbach Falls II and III

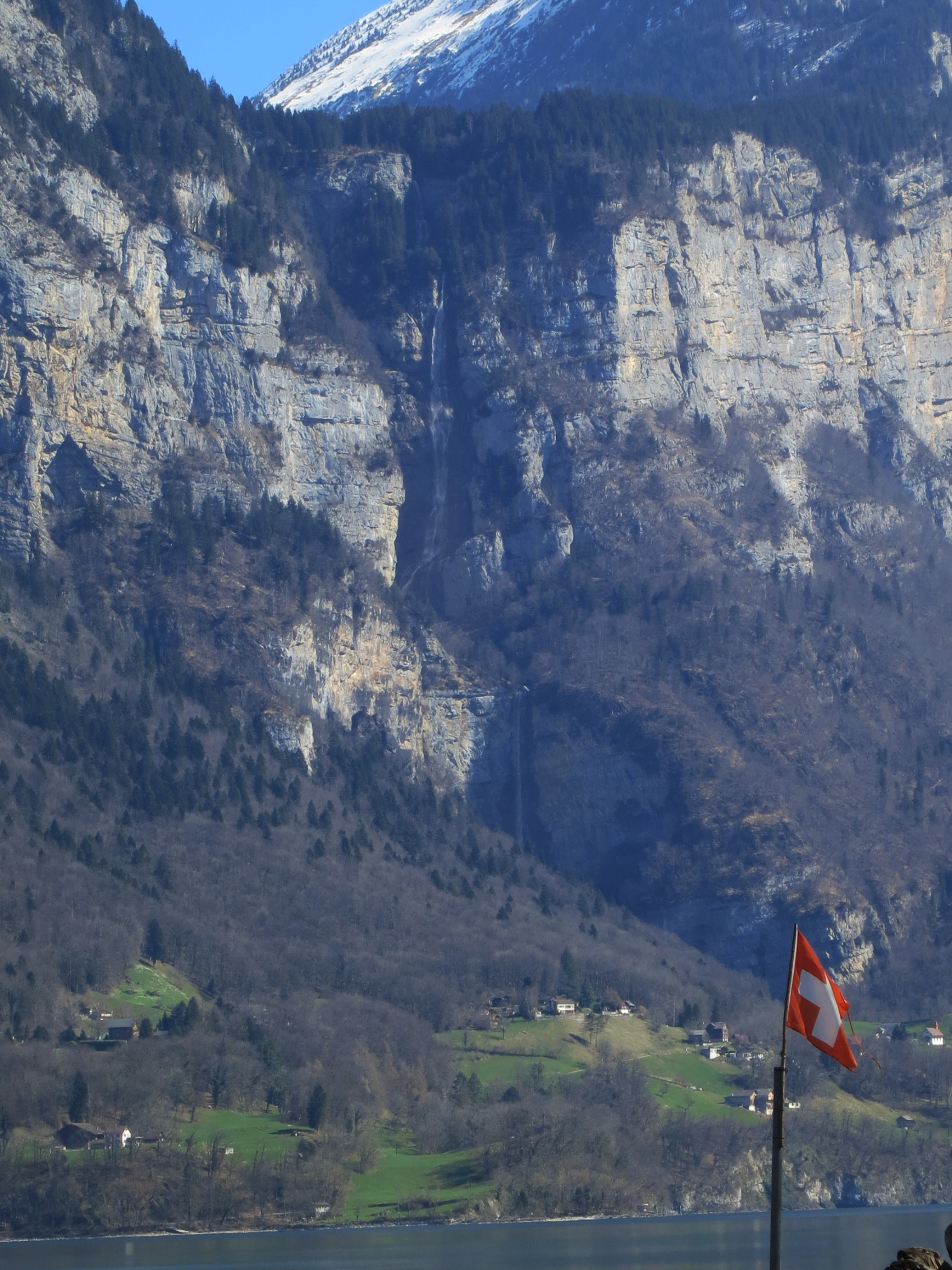
Seerenbach Falls and Lake Walen

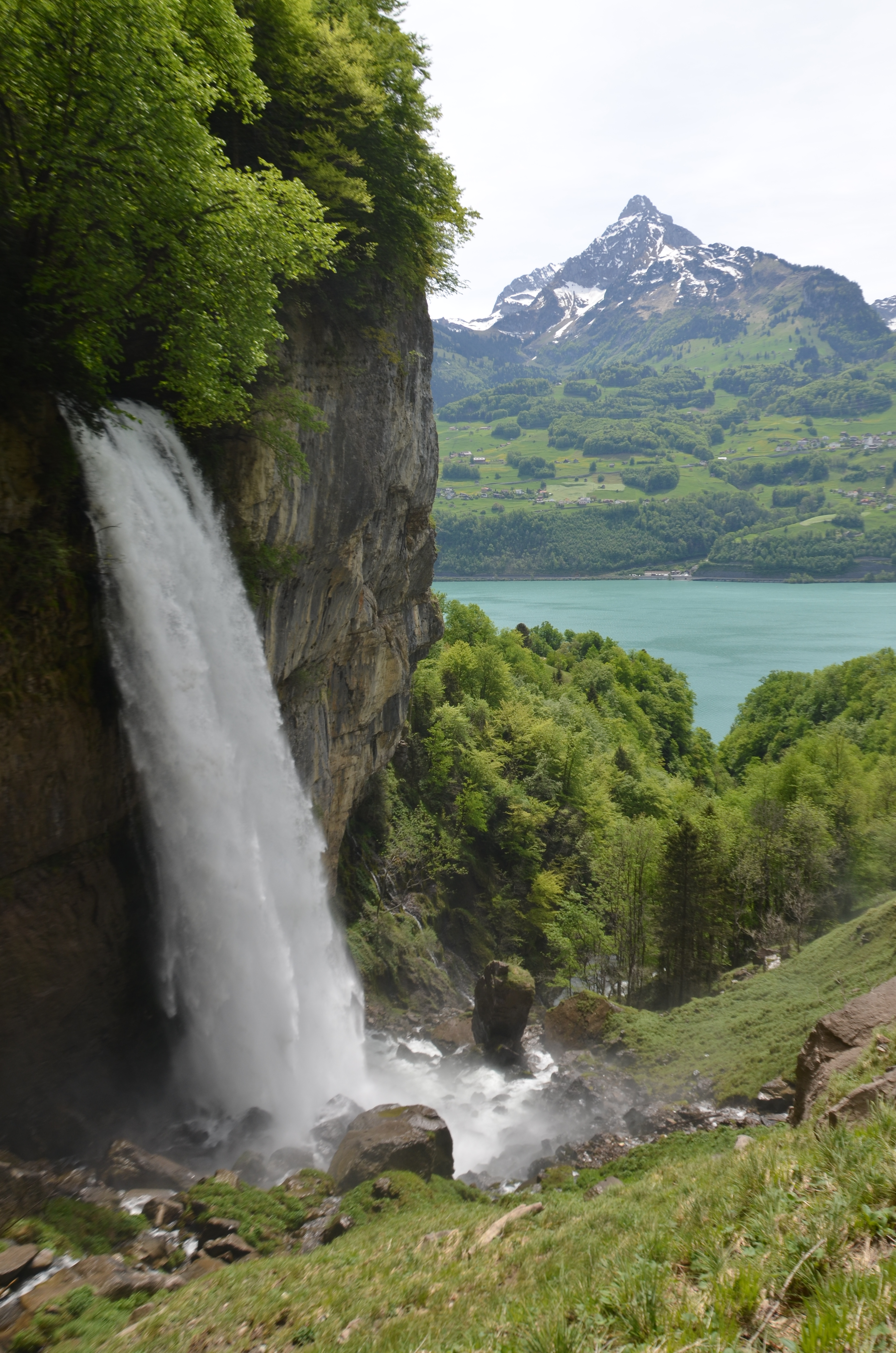
Riquelle Fall, Lake Walen and Mürtschenstock

== See also ==
- List of rivers of Switzerland
- List of waterfalls
- List of waterfalls in Switzerland
- Appenzell Alps
