= Mürrenbach Falls =

Waterfall in Switzerland

- German: Mürrenbachfall
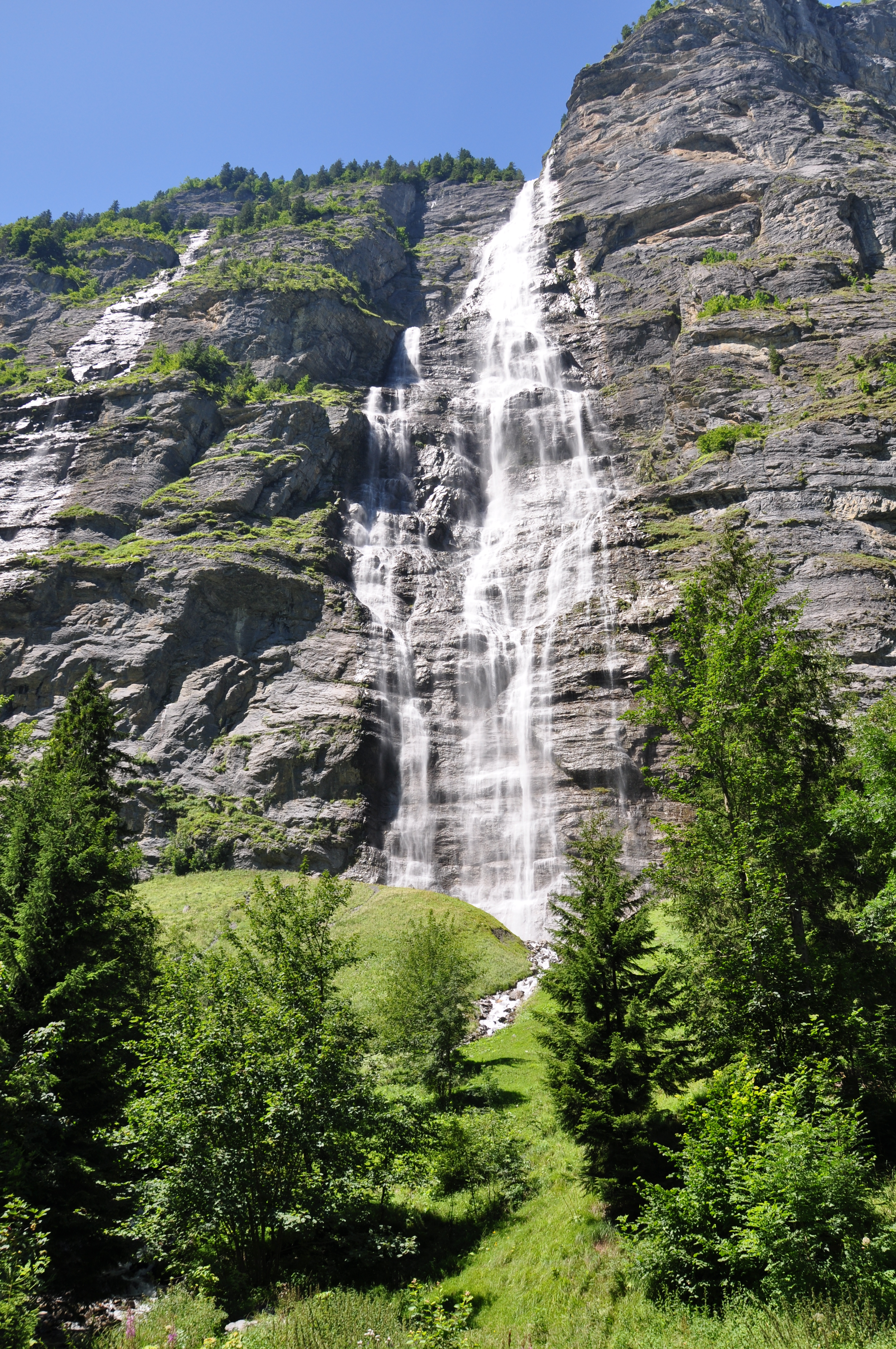
- Mürrenbach Falls in summer

- Location within Switzerland Location within Canton of Bern
- Interactive map of Mürrenbach Falls
- Location: Lauterbrunnental, District of Interlaken, canton of Bern
- Coordinates: 46.55554°N 7.89579°E
- Total height: 417 m (1,368 ft)

The Mürrenbachfall is a waterfall in the Lauterbrunnental in the Bernese Oberland, Switzerland. The Mürrenbach (Mürren Creek), which rises above Mürren, passes the village on the southern edge of the town and falls here over the high rock walls of the Trogtal almost to the valley floor, is a left tributary of the Weissen Lütschine with a catchment area of 3.5 square kilometres (1.4 sq mi).

In addition to the main fall, there are various other waterfalls on the Mürrenbach, so that people often talk about the Mürrenbach Falls, which together fall 750 metres (2,460 ft) deep into the valley in several stages. The impact zone of the main fall is around 920 metres (3,020 ft).

The waterfall is located near the valley station of the cable car to Mürren in Stechelberg, where the Mürrenbach flows into the Lütschine. It can also be clearly seen from the cable car.

== Description ==
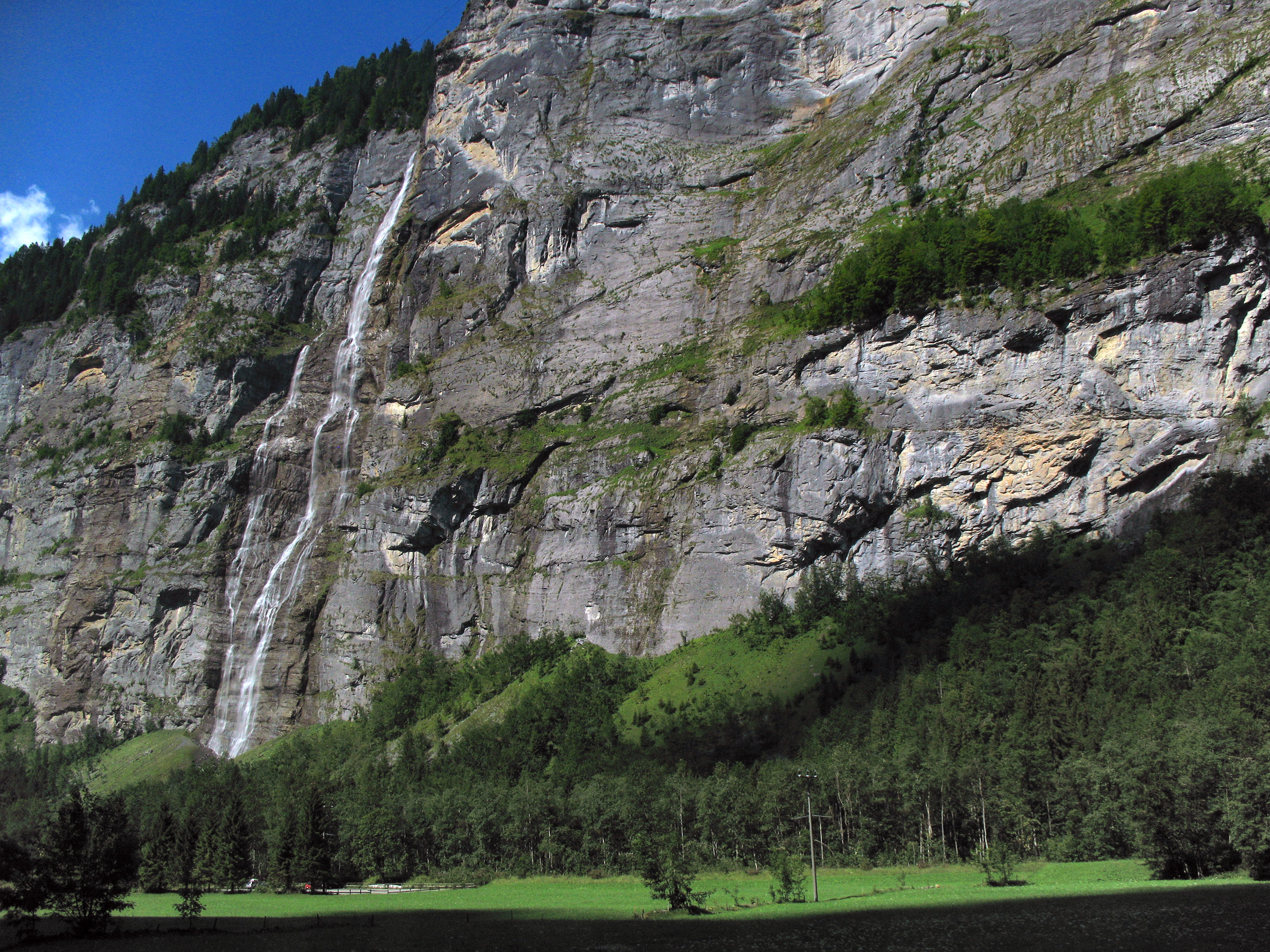
View from the north of the Mürrenfluh

According to studies from 2009, the Mürrenbachfall is considered the highest waterfall in Switzerland with a drop of 417 metres (1,368 ft). The Mürrenbachfall, previously known as cascade fall was redefined by geographers into a single case because, upon careful investigation, they could not find any horizontal planes typical of cascades in the case. However, this assignment is not completely clear. The second highest waterfall in Switzerland is the Serenbachfall II, which is 305 metres (1,001 ft) high. In terms of water volume, the Rhine Falls are the largest in Switzerland.

The Mürrenbachfall is not a free-falling waterfall on an overhanging rock like, for example, the Staubbachfall, also located in the Lauterbrunnen Valley, which at 297 metres (974 ft) is considered the highest free-falling waterfall in Switzerland. The water falls down here along the almost vertical rock of the Mürrenfluh.

== Transport ==
There is a PostAuto bus route from Lauterbrunnen railway station to near the bottom of the waterfall. Mürren is the top station of the Lauterbrunnen–Mürren Mountain Railway, located north of the waterfall. There is also a cable car to Mürren from Stechelberg.

== See also ==
- List of waterfalls
- List of waterfalls in Switzerland
- Tourism in Switzerland
