= Johann Georg Birnstiel =

Swiss clergyman and writer

Johann Georg Birnstiel (28 March 28, 1858 – 31 October 1927) was a Swiss writer and minister of the Swiss Reformed Church.

== Biography ==
Birnstiel was born and raised in Wattwil, Toggenburg. He was the son of Johann Georg Birnstiel, a businessman and bank president from Bavaria, and Salome Wälli, a Swiss woman. He was educated in Latin by a Catholic priest and later attended the Cantonal School in St. Gallen. He studied Protestant theology at the University of Basel. He was baptized in the Swiss Reformed faith by Zwingli Wirth.

On 14 June 1882 he married Nina Dürst in Andelfingen.

In 1881 Birnstiel was appointed as a Swiss Reformed pastor in Schönengrund. In 1888 he moved to Arbon, near Lake Constance, and started a new church there. He suffered from a stroke in 1913 and retired from ministry and spent the rest of his life as a writer. His writing included autobiographies, history books, and religious and theological works. In 1920, he moved to Romanshorn, where he died seven years later.

== Bibliography ==
- Zwingli als Charakter, Swiss Association for Free Christianity, Zurich 1907.
- Aus dem Heimatdorfe: Jugenderinnerungen, Helbing and Lichtenhahn, Basel 1916.
- Am Wege: von Kleinigkeiten, die Grosses sagen, Beer, Zurich 1920.
- Aus meinen Kantonsschul- und Studentenjahren, Schneider, Leipzig, St. Gallen 1920.
- Sonnwende über dem Iltishag: Eine Geschichte aus dem Oberen Toggenburg, Stutz, Wädenswil 1920.
- Aus sieben guten Jahren: Appenzeller-Erinnerungen, Helbing and Lichtenhahn, Basel 1920.
- Rudi Bürkis Auszug und Heimkehr: Aus den Tagen des schweizerischen Bauernkrieges: from the days of the Swiss peasant war, Helbing and Lichtenhahn, Basel 1922.
- Sonne und Wolken überm Jugendland: (Selbsterlebtes und Nacherzähltes): Helbing and Lichtenhahn, Basel 1923.
- Jakob Rümmelis schwere Wahl: Erzählung aus dem Weltkrieg, Association for dissemination of good writings, Bern 1925.
- Glückauf, der Heimat zu! Ein Bilderbuch fürs Kirchenjahr, Helbing and Lichtenhahn, Basel 1926.
- Unterm grünen Baum: Plaudereien und Erinnerungen eines alten Pfarrers, Helbing and Lichtenhahn, Basel 1927.
- Letzte Ernte: grossväterliche Plaudereien, Helbing and Lichtenhahn, Basel 1929.
