= Jakob Adlung =

German musician and instrument maker (1699–1762)

Jakob Adlung, or Adelung, (14 January 1699 – 5 July 1762) was a German organist, teacher, instrument maker, music historian, composer and music theorist.

== Biography ==
He was born in Bindersleben, near Erfurt, to David Adlung, an organist and his first teacher, and the former Dorothea Elisabetha Meuerin, from Tondorf. He attended the St. Andreas lower school in Erfurt from 1711, moving on to the Erfurt Gymnasium in 1713, during which time he lived in the household of Christian Reichardt, who also taught him organ. He studied philosophy, philology, and theology at the University of Jena from 1723 to 1726, where he studied the organ further with Johann Nikolaus Bach. At this time, he became friends with Johann Gottfried Walther in Weimar, and borrowed his works on music theory; he later wrote some books on the subject, most of which were destroyed, along with his house, in a fire in 1736. He returned to Erfurt in 1737 where he succeeded Johann Heinrich Buttstedt as organist of the Prediger church after the former's death, a post he retained for the rest of his life. He was also professor of languages at the Erfurt Gymnasium and taught, by his own estimate, 218 organ students and 284 language students between 1728 and 1762. He was also a maker of keyboard instruments, and completed sixteen of the same. He married Elisabeth Ritter in 1732, who was the daughter of the mayor of Gross-Wanzleben, near Magdeburg.

== Work ==
He is one of a group of scholar-musicians of the mid-18th century, along with Johann Mattheson, Lorenz Christoph Mizler, and Johann Gottfried Walther, who all produced studies of the theory, aesthetics, and practice of music. These works remain sources of information about baroque music and performance practice.

Anleitung zu der musikalischen Gelahrtheit records and collates all knowledge he could find about music history, mathematics in relation to music, temperament, more about the organ, other musical instruments, singing, thoroughbass, the chorale and chorale preludes, improvisation, Italian tablature, and composition. As a composer, he predominantly wrote pieces for organ. According to Adlung, it was Andreas Werckmeister who introduced the Equal Temperament in Germany at the end of the 17th century.

== Organ works ==
- Ermuntre dich, mein schwacher Geist - Christus, der ist mein Lebe - Herr Christ, der einig Gottessohn - Trio in a-minor

== Writings ==
His autobiography is in the 'Vorrede' of part II of Musica mechanica organoedi.

- Musica mechanica organoedi, 1726 (Berlin, 1768); a modern edition by C. Mahrenholz (Kassel, 1931; English translation by Quentin Faulkner, Lincoln, NE, 2011) - effectively a comprehensive organ builder's encyclopedia, with descriptions of more than 80 German organs. The edition made by J.L. Albrecht and J.F. Agricola provides an insight into Johann Sebastian Bach's opinions on organ building and design through the editorial notes, drawn from their student-teacher relationship.
- Anleitung zu der musikalischen Gelahrtheit (Erfurt, 1758, 1783)
- Musikalisches Siebengestirn, das ist Sieben zu der edlen Tonkunst gehörige Fragen (Berlin, 1768)

== Sources ==
- George J. Buelow/Quentin Faulkner: 'Adlung [Adelung], Jakob', Grove Music Online ed. L. Macy (Accessed 2007-06-13)
