= Iberg Castle, St. Gallen =

Castle in Wattwil, Switzerland

Iberg Castle
- Yburg, Iburg
- Wattwil
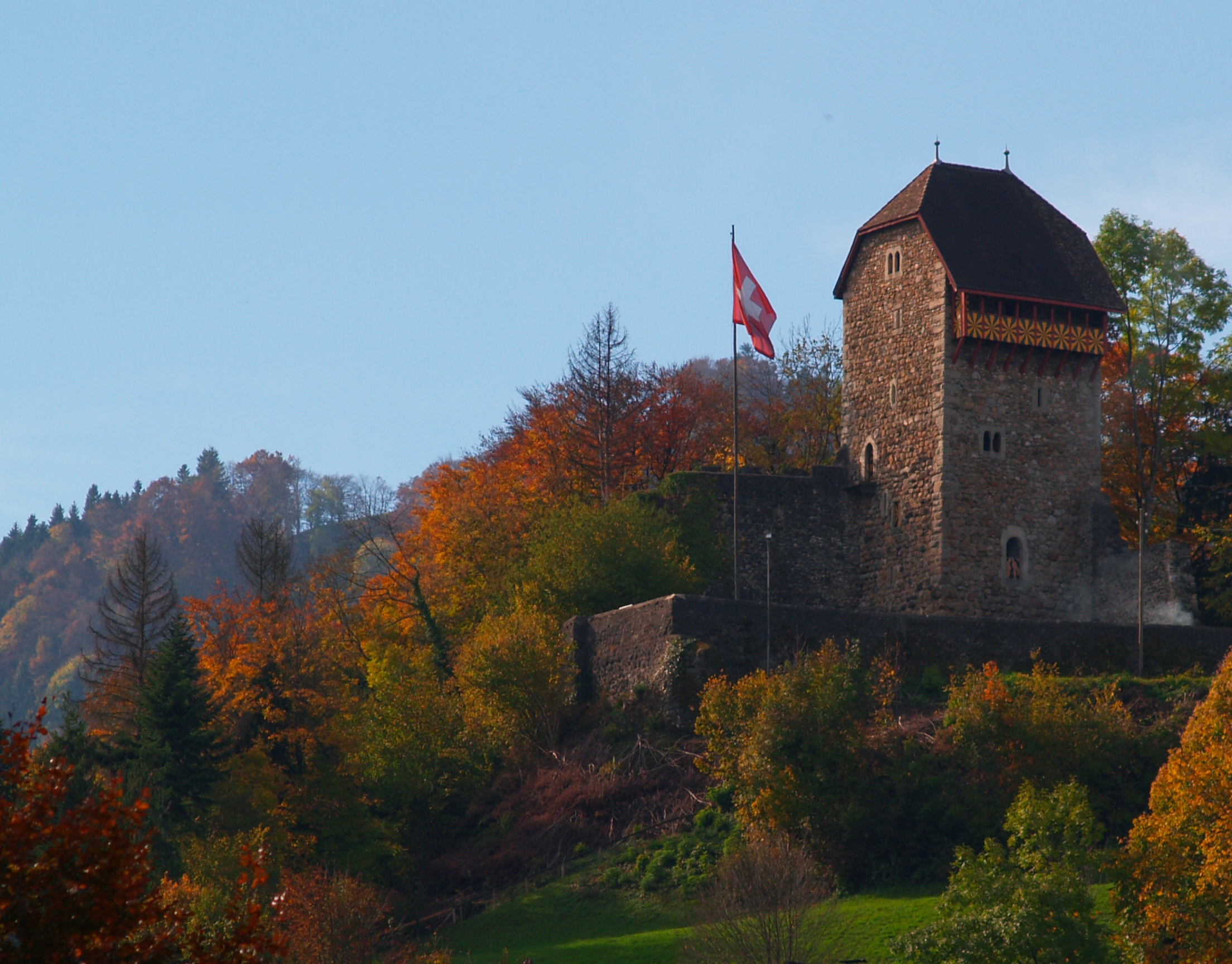
- Ruins of Iberg from north-east

Site information
- Type: Hill castle
- Code: CH-SG
- Condition: Burg

Location
- Coordinates: 47°17′51″N 09°04′48″E
- Height: 740 m above the sea

Site history
- Built: 1200
- Materials: Rough cut bossage

Iberg Castle (German: Burg Iberg) is a partly ruined castle in Wattwil in the Toggenburg region of the canton of St. Gallen in Switzerland.

There is a barbecue area.

== See also ==
- List of castles and fortresses in Switzerland
