= Trümmelbach Falls =

Waterfalls in Switzerland

- German: Trümmelbachfälle
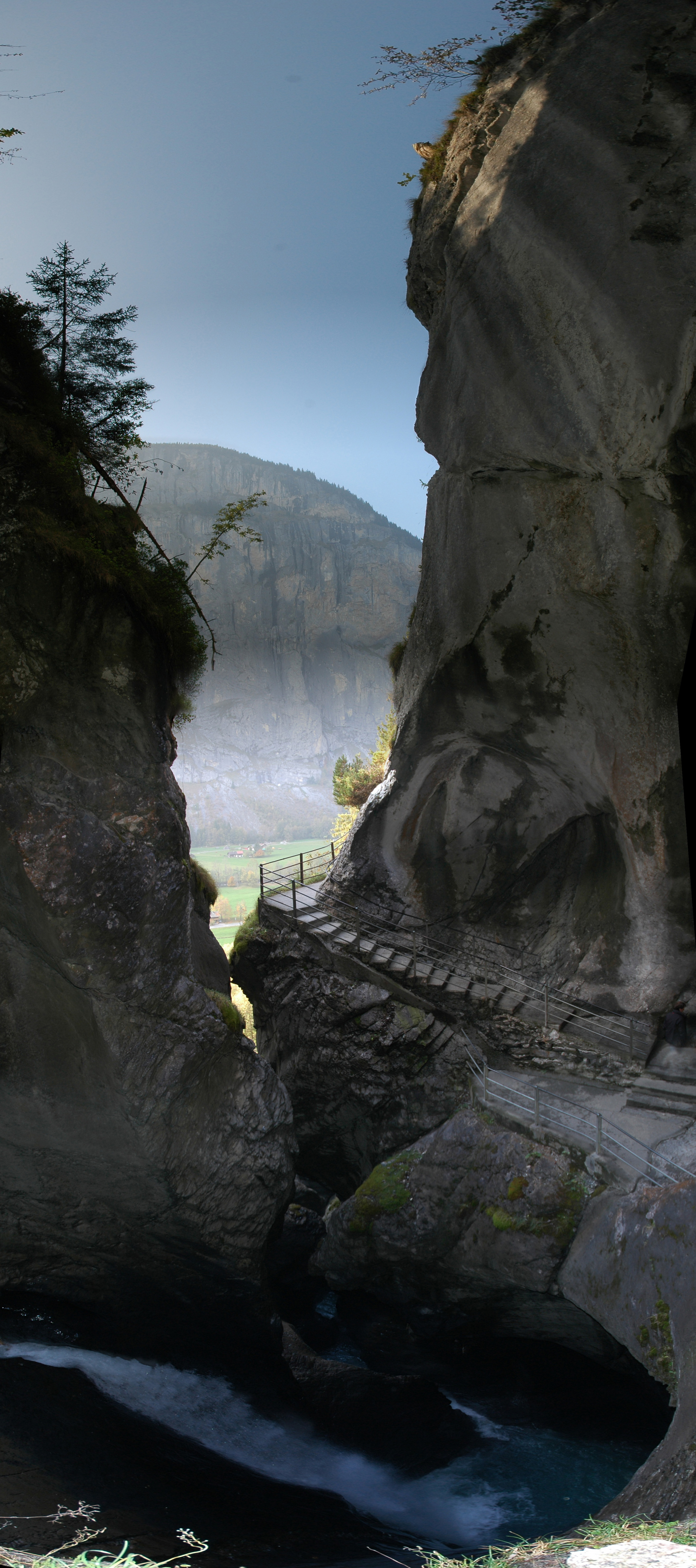
- View from the Trümmelbach Falls
- Interactive map of Trümmelbach Falls
- Location: Lauterbrunnental, District of Interlaken, canton of Bern
- Coordinates: 46°34′8.65″N 7°54′53.94″E
- Type: Tiered
- Total height: 140 m (460 ft)
- Number of drops: 10
- Total width: 12 m (39 ft)
- Average flow rate: 3 m^{3}/s (110 cu ft/s)

Trümmelbach Falls (German: Trümmelbachfälle) are a series of ten waterfalls within a mountain in the Lauterbrunnen Valley of the Bernese Oberland in Switzerland. The stream is fed by meltwater from glaciers on the flanks of the Eiger, Mönch and Jungfrau and descends about 140 metres through the mountain. The waterfalls have been accessible to visitors since the late 19th century via tunnels, galleries and stairways and are listed in Switzerland’s Federal Inventory of Natural Monuments.

== Description ==
Located in the Lauterbrunnen Valley, the Trümmelbach is fed by meltwater from glaciers on the flanks of the Eiger, Mönch and Jungfrau. The stream drains a catchment area of about 24 square kilometres, roughly half of which is covered by snow and glaciers. The waterfalls can carry up to 20,000 litres of water per second.

Unlike many other waterfalls in the Lauterbrunnen Valley, the water does not fall freely over cliffs but flows through a gorge inside the mountain. The amount of water in the Trümmelbach varies greatly during the year. In spring and early summer, the flow can reach about 20 cubic metres per second. The stream falls roughly 140 metres inside the mountain.

Rock and sediment are carried down with the water. The often makes the stream cloudy in spring. By autumn, the water is usually clearer because the flow is lower.

== Tourism ==
The waterfalls have been open to visitors since 1877, after the first walkways and bridges were built. The route include tunnels and galleries inside the mountain. It is about 600 metres long and includes stairways and several places where to see the waterfalls.

The falls are listed in Switzerland’s Federal Inventory of Natural Monuments.

== Gallery ==
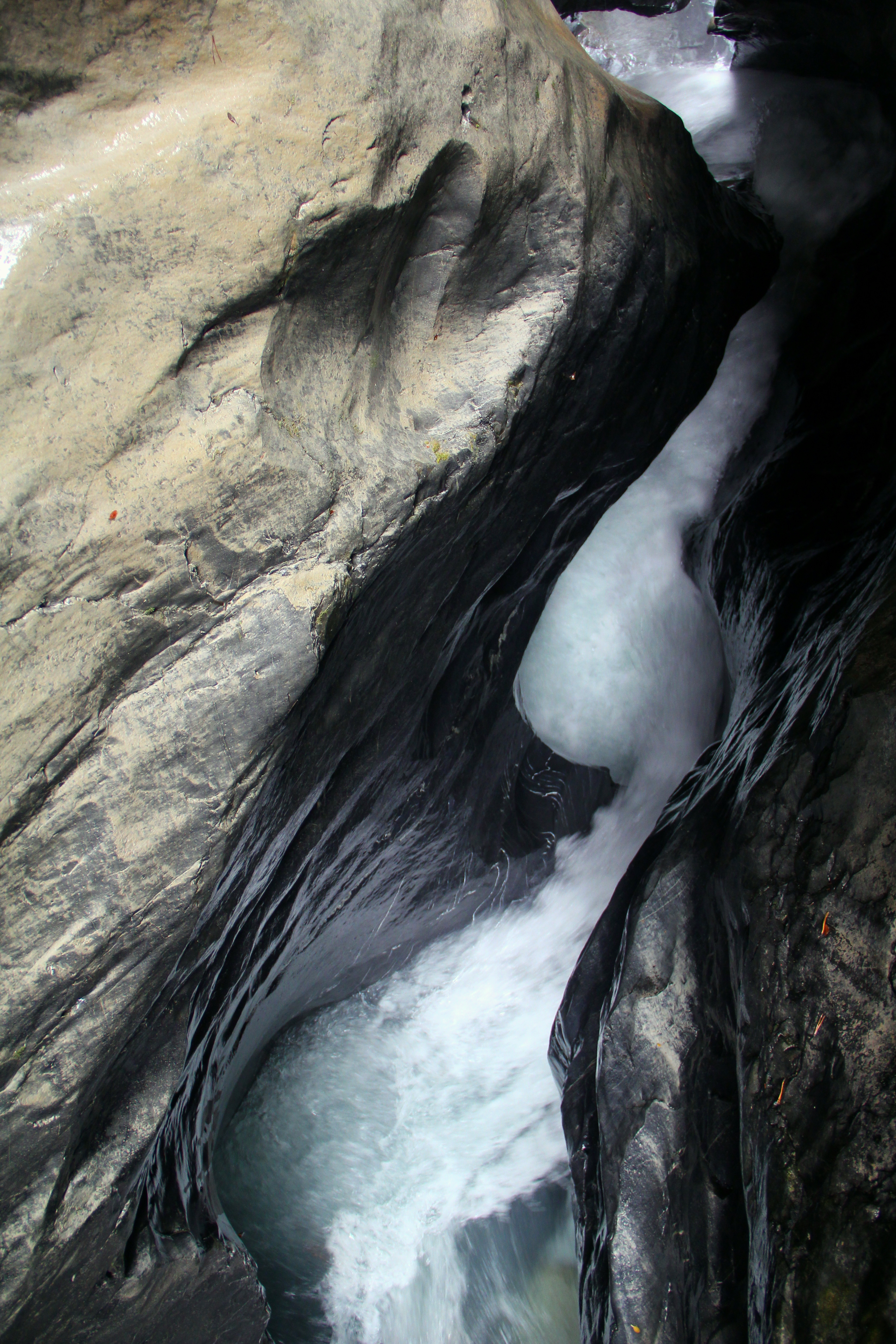
The 'Corkscrew' chute

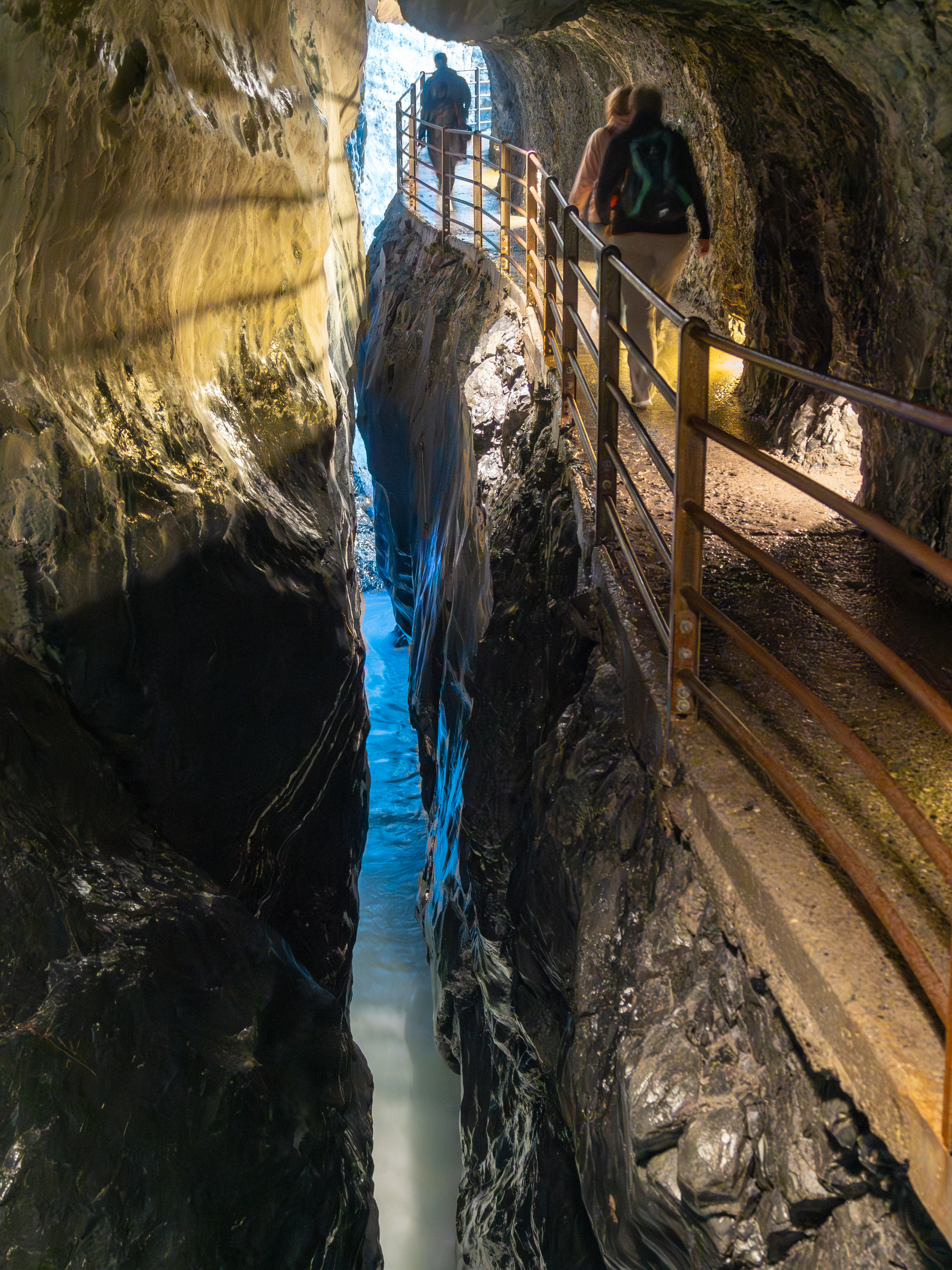

== See also ==
- List of waterfalls
- List of waterfalls in Switzerland
- Tourism in Switzerland
