= Friedrich Wilhelm Birnstiel =

German music publishers

Friedrich Wilhelm Birnstiel was an 18th-century German music publisher known for publishing two volumes of four-part chorales by Johann Sebastian Bach in the 1760s.

== Publications ==
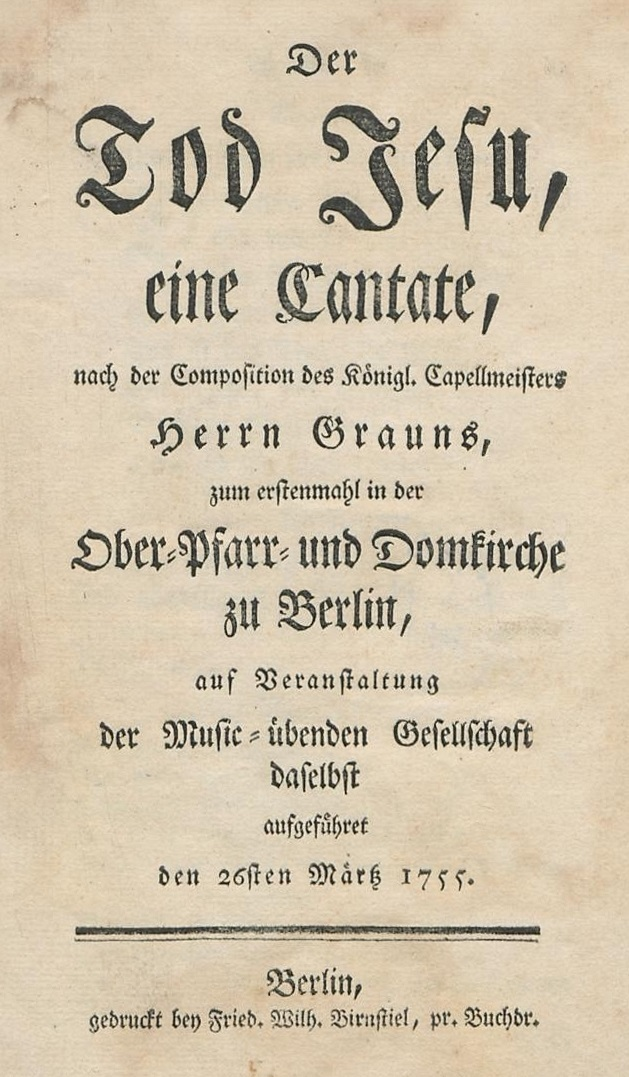
Title page of Graun's Der Tod Jesu.

Friedrich Wilhelm Birnstiel was active as a publisher and editor of music between 1753 and 1782.

=== Oden mit Melodien ===
Oden mit Melodien (odes with melodies) was published in two volumes:

- Vol. 1 (1753, reprinted 1761)
- Vol. 2 (1755)

The volumes contained works by Johann Friedrich Agricola, Carl Philipp Emanuel Bach, Johann Christian Bach, Franz Benda, Carl Friedrich Christian Fasch, Johann Gottlieb Graun, Carl Heinrich Graun, Johann Philipp Kirnberger, Christian Gottfried Krause, Friedrich Wilhelm Marpurg, Christoph Nichelmann and Johann Joachim Quantz.

=== Libretto of Graun's Der Tod Jesu cantata ===
In 1755 Birnstiel published Karl Wilhelm Ramler's libretto of Carl Heinrich Graun's cantata Der Tod Jesu. The music of this Passion setting was published five years later by Johann Gottlob Immanuel Breitkopf.

=== Kritische Briefe über die Tonkunst ===
The Kritische Briefe über die Tonkunst (critical letters about musical composition) were published from 1759 to 1764, edited by Friedrich Wilhelm Marpurg, who was also the author of most of the letters in this collection. They were published in three volumes:

- Vol. 1, in four parts (letters 1–64, 1760).
- Vol. 2, in four parts (letters 65–128, 1763).
- Vol. 3, one part (letters 129–143, 1764).
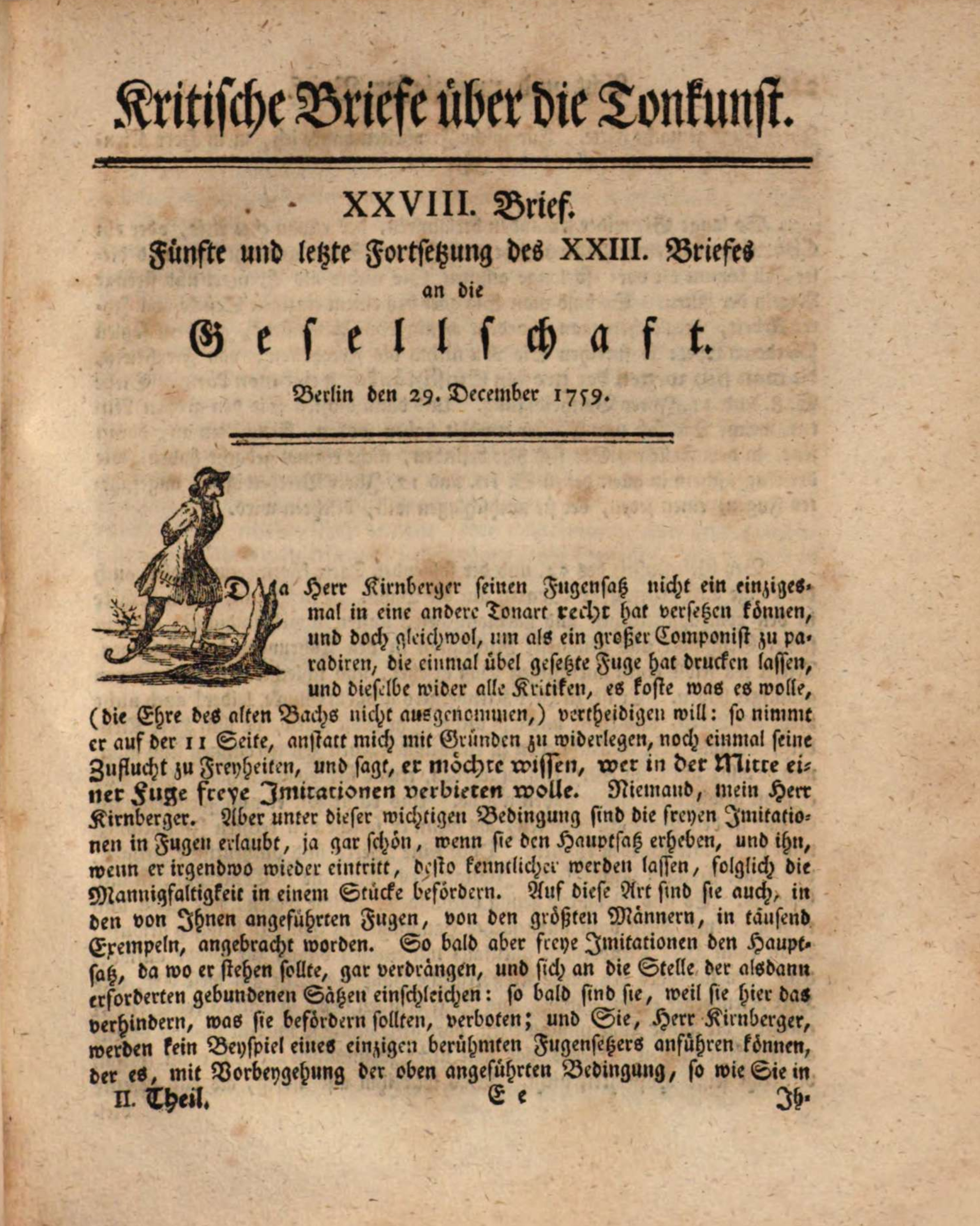
Vol. I (1760), p. 215 (28th letter, 1759, start)

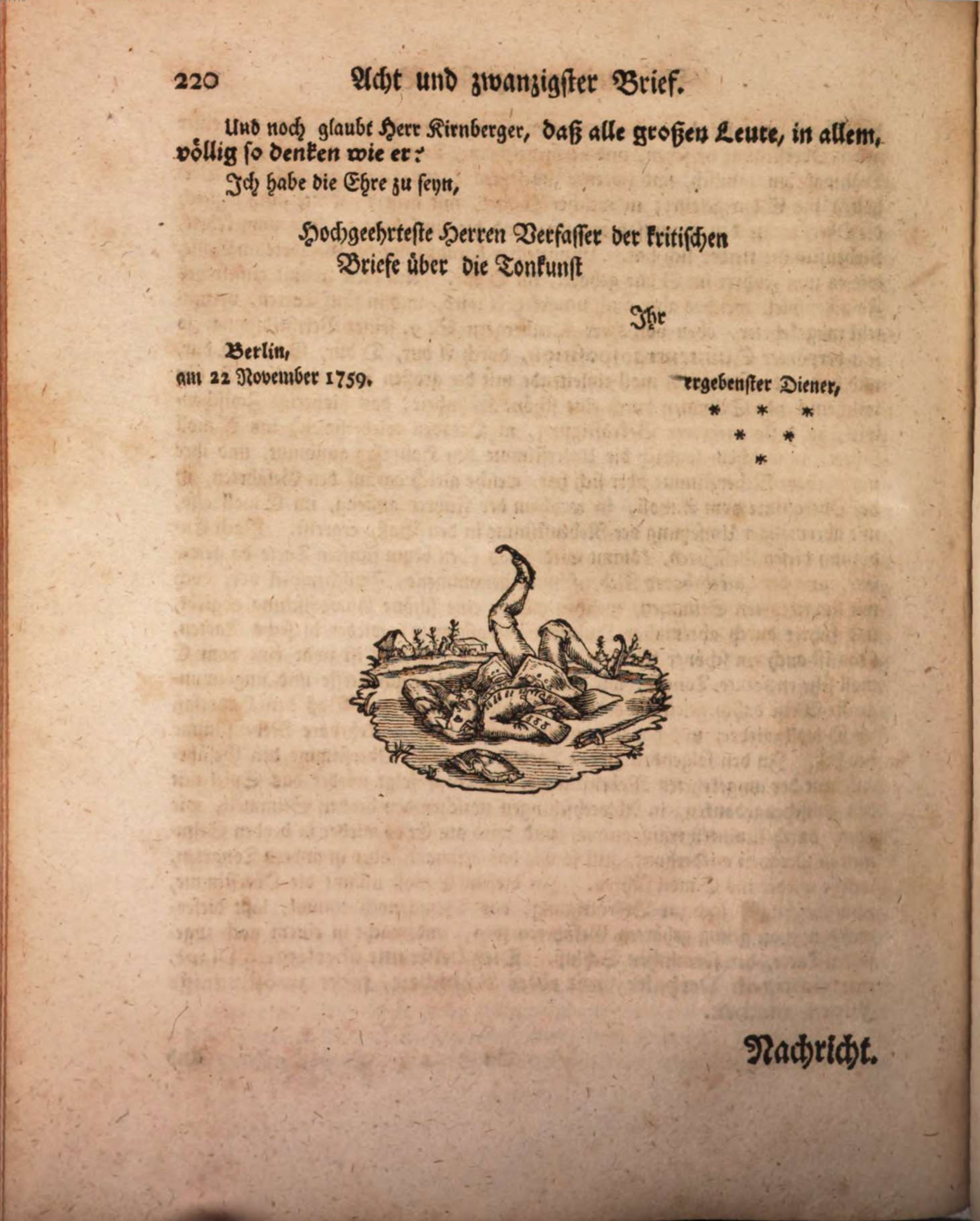
Vol. I (1760), p. 220 (28th letter, 1759, end)

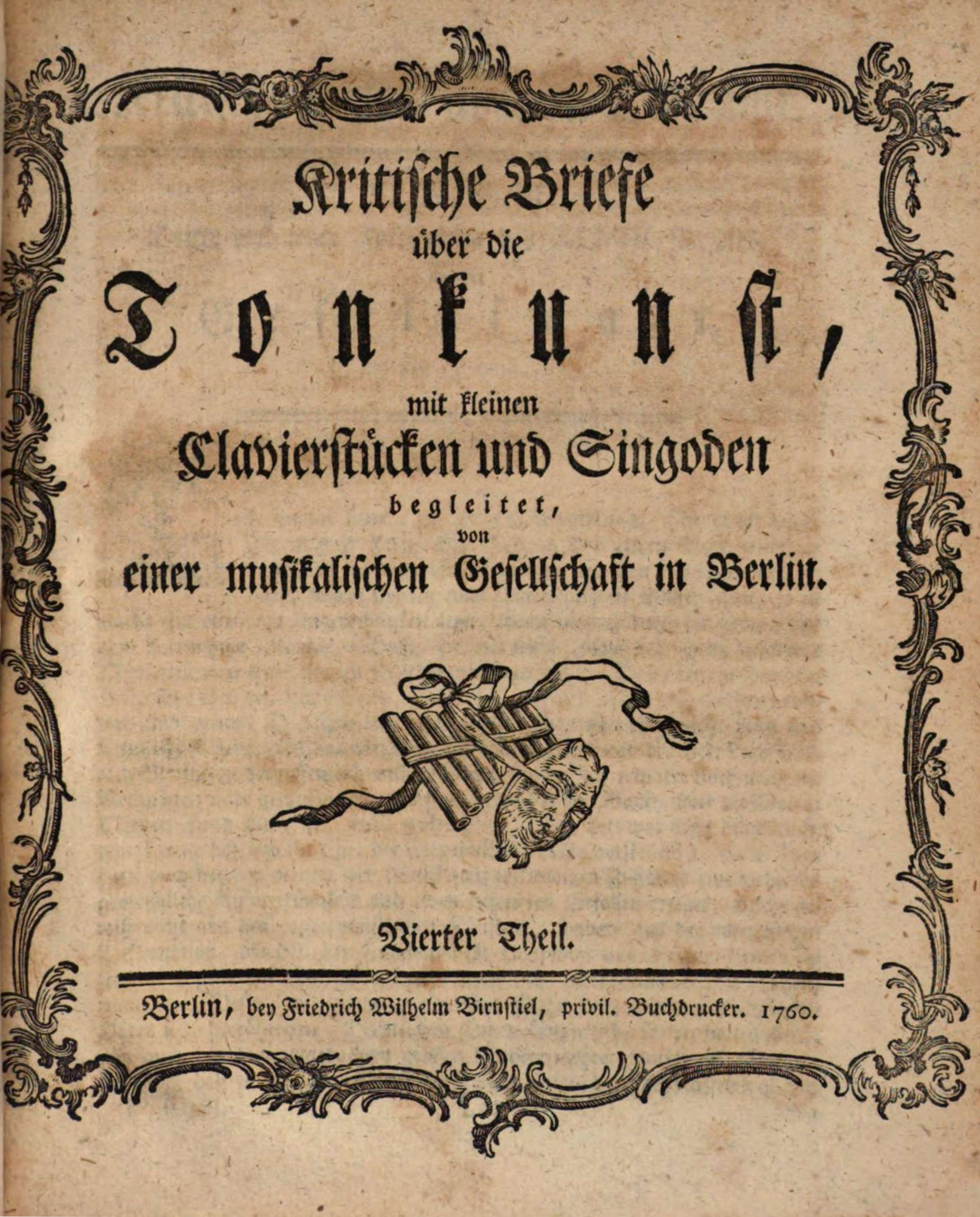
Vol. I (1760), title page of part IV (between pp. 380 and 381).

=== Musikalisches Allerley ===
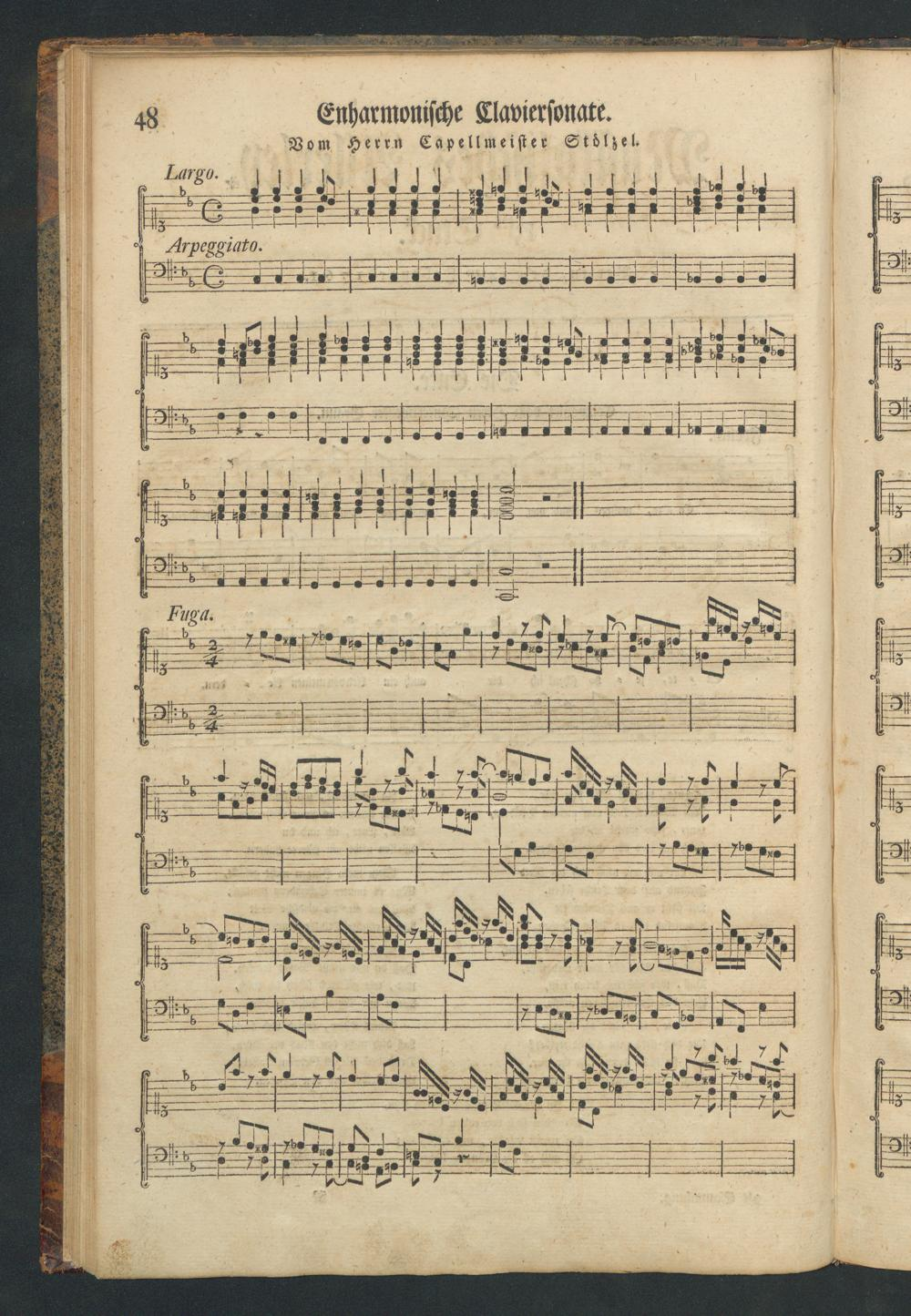
Gottfried Heinrich Stölzel's Enharmonische Claviersonate in the second volume (13th instalment) of Musikalisches Allerley.

Musikalisches Allerley von verschiedenen Tonkünstlern (musical miscellaneous by various composers):

- Vol. 1 (instalments 1–6, 1760, and instalment 7, 1761)
- Vol. 2 (instalments 9–16, 1761)
- Vol. 3 (instalments 17–24, 1761)
- Vol. 4 (instalments 25–32, 1761)
- Vol. 5 (instalments 33–40, 1761)
- Vol. 6 (instalments 41–45, 1761, and instalments 46–48, 1762)
- Vol. 7 (instalments 49–56, 1762)
- Vol. 8 (instalments 57–64, 1763)
- Vol. 9 (instalments 65–72, 1763)

Contains compositions by, among others, Johann Friedrich Agricola, Carl Philipp Emanuel Bach, Johann Thielemann Cramer, Jean-François Dandrieu, Carl Friedrich Christian Fasch, Carl Heinrich Graun, August Bernhard Valentin Herbing, Johann Gottlieb Janitsch, Johann Philipp Kirnberger, Christian Gottfried Krause, Friedrich Wilhelm Marpurg, Christoph Nichelmann, Johann Joachim Quantz, Jean-Philippe Rameau, Friedrich Wilhelm Riedt, Johann Heinrich Rolle, Johann Philipp Sack, Christian Friedrich Schale, Gottfried Heinrich Stölzel, Georg Christoph Wagenseil, Johann Friedrich Wilhelm Wenkel.

=== Johann Philipp Kirnbergers Clavierübungen mit der Bachischen Applicatur ===
Johann Philipp Kirnbergers Clavierübungen mit der Bachischen Applicatur were published in four volumes from 1761 to 1766:

- Vol. 1 (1761).
- Vol. 2 (1762).
- Vol. 3 (1763).
- Vol. 4 (1766).

=== Descriptions of painting collections ===
Descriptions of painting collections, both published in 1763:

- Beschreibung des Cabinets von Gemählden verschiedener berühmten Mahler des Herrn Johann Gottlieb Stein (description of Johann Gottlieb Stein's cabinet of paintings by various famous painters), with an introduction by Matthias Oesterreich.
- Des Herrn Daniel Stenglin in Hamburg Sammlung von italienischen, holländischen und deutschen Gemählden by Matthias Oesterreich.

=== Kirnberger's Construction der gleichschwebenden Temperatur ===
Kirnberger's Construction der gleichschwebenden Temperatur was published in 1764.

=== Kleine Sing- und Spielstücke fürs Clavier ===
The Kleine Sing- und Spielstücke fürs Clavier von verschiedenen Meistern volumes contained mostly material that had already been published before, for instance as examples in Marpurg's Kritische Briefe:

- Vol. 1 (1764)
- Vol. 2 (1764)
- Vol. 3 (1766)

=== Johann Sebastian Bachs vierstimmige Choralgesänge ===
The first volume of Johann Sebastian Bachs vierstimmige Choralgesänge was published in 1765, and the second volume in 1769. Each volume contained 100 chorale harmonisations, most of them by Johann Sebastian Bach.

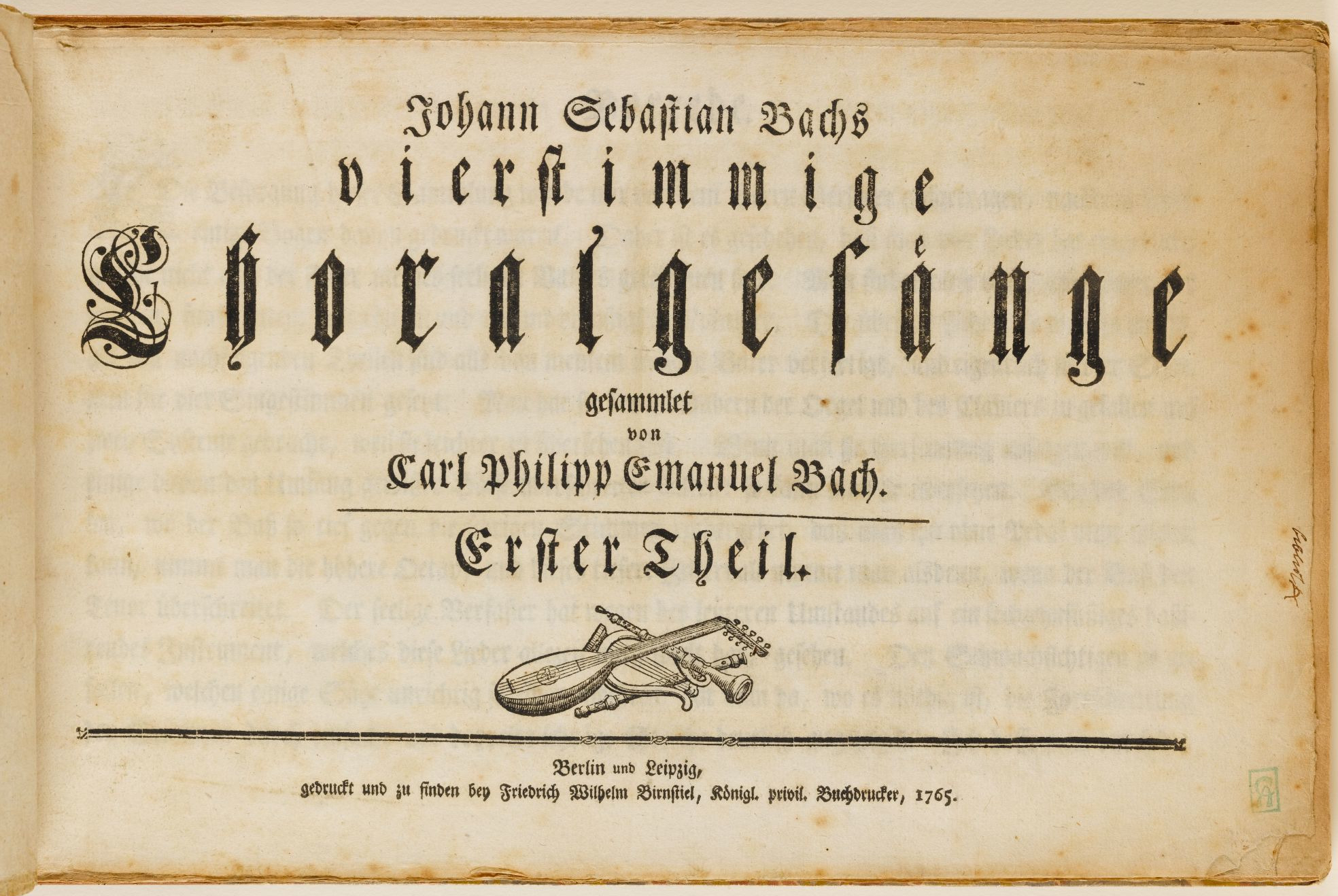
Vol. 1 (1765), title page

Vol. 1 (1765), C. P. E. Bach's Preface (start)

Vol. 1 (1765), C. P. E. Bach's Preface (end)

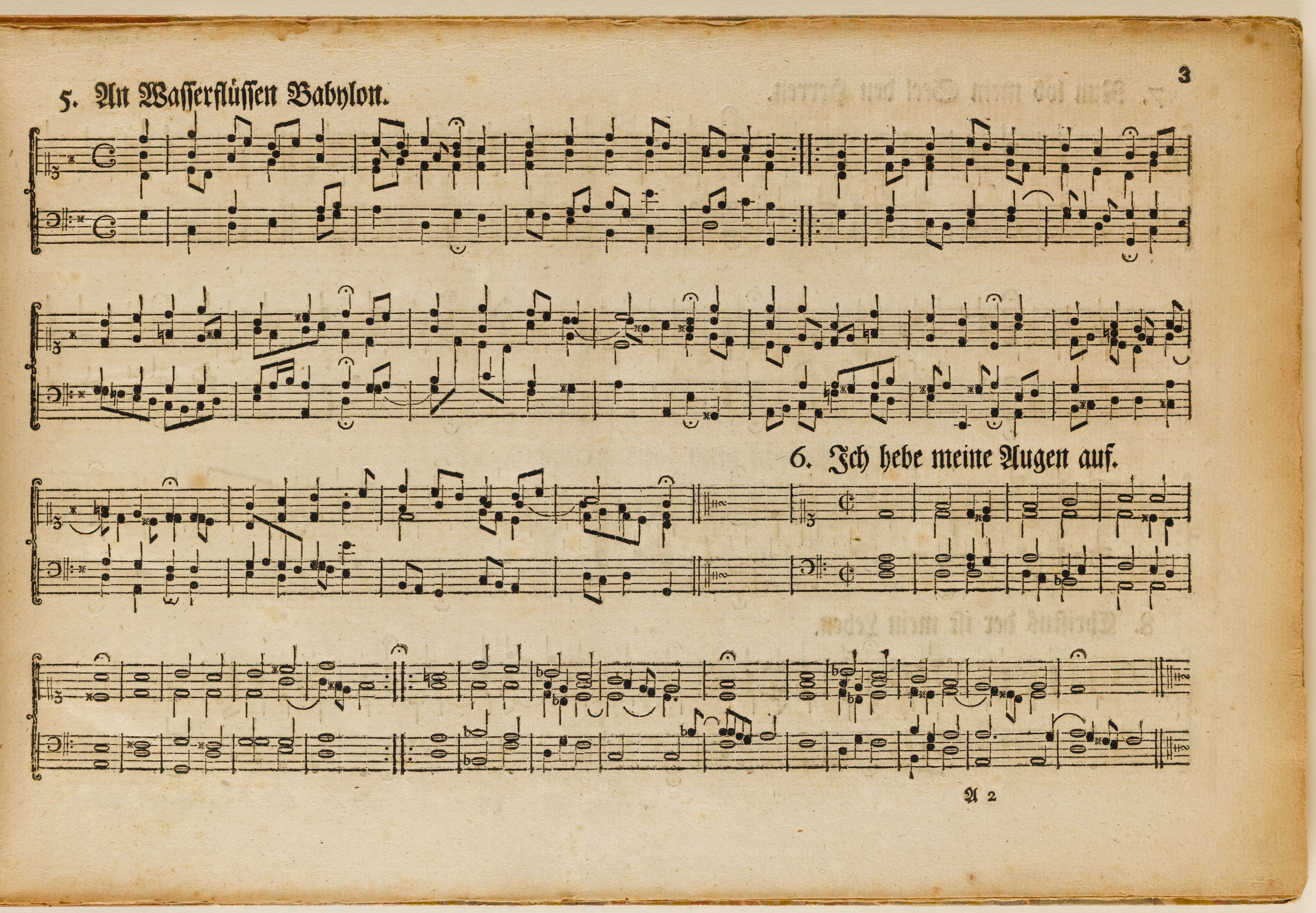
Vol. 1 (1765), p. 3, containing BWV 267 by J. S. Bach and BWV Anh. 203 by D. Vetter.

=== Adlung's Musica mechanica organoedi and Musikalisches Siebengestirn ===
Jakob Adlung's Musica mechanica organoedi and Musikalisches Siebengestirn were published in 1768.

=== Berlinisches litterarisches Wochenblatt ===
Editions of the Berlinisches litterarisches Wochenblatt (Berlin literary weekly) were grouped in volumes:

- 1776, 2 volumes.
- 1777, 2 volumes.

=== Müller's Drey Sonaten for keyboard duet ===
Drey Sonaten, fürs Clavier: als Doppelstücke für zwo Personen mit vier Händen by Christian Heinrich Müller was published in 1782.

== Sources ==
- Schulze, Hans-Joachim (2003). "'Vierstimmige Choraele, aus den Kirchen Stücken des Herrn J. S. Bachs zusammen getragen': Eine Handschrift Karl Friedrich Faschs in der Bibliothek der Sing-Akademie zu Berlin". In Wagner, Günther (ed.). Jahrbuch des Staatlichen Instituts für Musikforschung Preußischer Kulturbesitz. Springer. pp. 9–30. ISBN 9783476028853.
