= Wattwil =

- Municipality
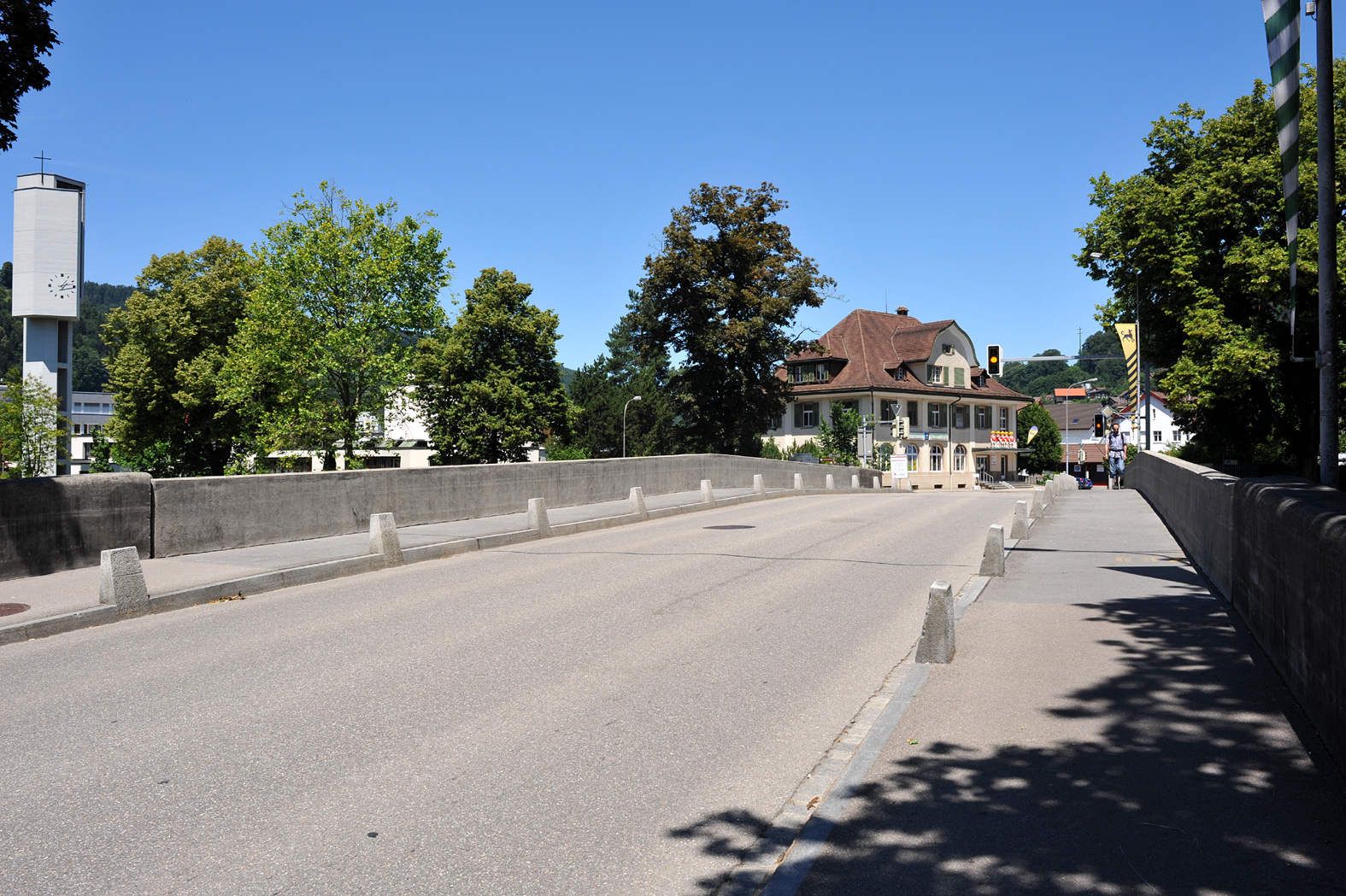

- Coat of arms
- Location of Wattwil
- Location within Switzerland Location within Canton of St. Gallen
- Coordinates: 47°18′11.3″N 9°5′17″E
- Country: Switzerland
- Canton: St. Gallen
- District: Toggenburg

Government
  - Mayor: Alois Gunzenreiner

Area
  - Total: 43.93 km^{2} (16.96 sq mi)
- Elevation: 610 m (2,000 ft)

Population (Dec 2014)
  - Total: 8,536
  - Density: 194.3/km^{2} (503.3/sq mi)
- Time zone: UTC+01:00 (CET)
  - Summer (DST): UTC+02:00 (CEST)
- Postal code: 9630
- SFOS number: 3379
- ISO 3166 code: CH-SG
- Surrounded by: Brunnadern, Bütschwil, Ebnat-Kappel, Ernetschwil, Goldingen, Gommiswald, Hemberg, Krinau, Lichtensteig, Mosnang, Oberhelfenschwil, Sankt Gallenkappel
- Website: www.wattwil.ch

Wattwil is a municipality in the Wahlkreis (constituency) of Toggenburg in the canton of St. Gallen in Switzerland, located along the Thur river. On 1 January 2013 the municipality of Krinau merged into Wattwil.

== Geography ==
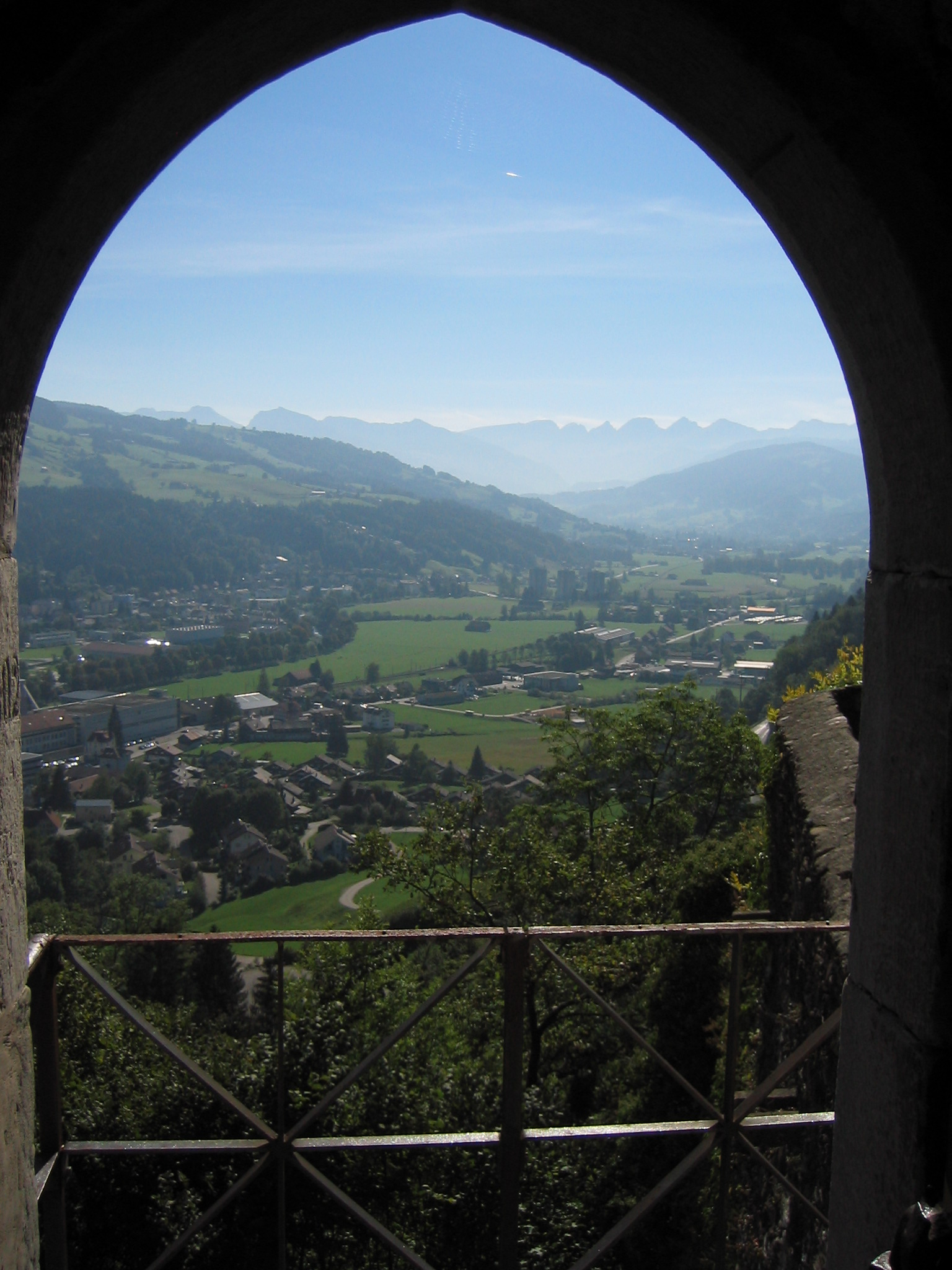
View over Wattwil and Churfirsten from castle Iberg

Aerial view from 200 m by Walter Mittelholzer (1919)

Since the merger, the new municipality has an area of 51.18 km^{2} (19.76 sq mi).

Before the merger, Wattwil had an area, as of 2006, of 44 km^{2} (17 sq mi). Of this area, 52.6% is used for agricultural purposes, while 37.3% is forested. Of the rest of the land, 8.3% is settled (buildings or roads) and the remainder (1.8%) is non-productive (rivers or lakes).

Krinau had an area, as of 2006, of 7.3 km^{2} (2.8 sq mi). Of this area, 57.6% is used for agricultural purposes, while 39.1% is forested. Of the rest of the land, 2.8% is settled (buildings or roads) and the remainder (0.6%) is non-productive (rivers or lakes). It consisted of the village of Krinau and the hamlets of Altschwil, Au, Dreischlatt, Gurtberg, Schuflenberg, Krinäuli, Niederberg, Kapf and Gruben.

== Coat of arms ==
The municipal coat of arms is blazoned Or, two Unicorns' Heads couped addorsed Azure. It was introduced in 1924 (the design of the unicorns used based on a drawing by Fritz Brunner), and ratified 13 October 1925. The design is based on the coat of arms of the Iberg bailiwick of the Abbey of St. Gallen, first attested in a Wappenscheibe dated 1551 (again in 1581, 1629 and 1708).

== Demographics ==
Wattwil has a population (as of 31 December 2020) of 8,837. Krinau had a population (as of 2011) of 260. As of 2007, about 23.1% of the population was made up of foreign nationals. Of the foreign population, (as of 2000), 192 are from Germany, 335 are from Italy, 717 are from ex-Yugoslavia, 29 are from Austria, 388 are from Turkey, and 322 are from another country. Over the last 10 years the population has decreased at a rate of -2.6%. Most of the population (as of 2000) speaks German (86.9%), with Italian being second most common (2.9%) and Serbo-Croatian being third (2.6%). Of the Swiss national languages (as of 2000), 7,182 speak German, 28 people speak French, 238 people speak Italian, and 3 people speak Romansh.

The age distribution, as of 2000, in Wattwil is; 1,056 children or 12.8% of the population are between 0 and 9 years old and 1,155 teenagers or 14.0% are between 10 and 19. Of the adult population, 1,001 people or 12.1% of the population are between 20 and 29 years old. 1,209 people or 14.6% are between 30 and 39, 1,087 people or 13.2% are between 40 and 49, and 1,015 people or 12.3% are between 50 and 59. The senior population distribution is 766 people or 9.3% of the population are between 60 and 69 years old, 594 people or 7.2% are between 70 and 79, there are 322 people or 3.9% who are between 80 and 89, and there are 60 people or 0.7% who are between 90 and 99.

In 2000 there were 1,049 persons (or 12.7% of the population) who were living alone in a private dwelling. There were 1,760 (or 21.3%) persons who were part of a couple (married or otherwise committed) without children, and 4,632 (or 56.0%) who were part of a couple with children. There were 425 (or 5.1%) people who lived in single parent home, while there are 52 persons who were adult children living with one or both parents, 21 persons who lived in a household made up of relatives, 42 who lived household made up of unrelated persons, and 284 who are either institutionalized or live in another type of collective housing.

In the 2007 federal election the most popular party was the SVP which received 37.5% of the vote. The next three most popular parties were the CVP (17.5%), the FDP (15.1%) and the SP (13.5%).

In Wattwil about 63.1% of the population (between age 25-64) have completed either non-mandatory upper secondary education or additional higher education (either university or a Fachhochschule). Out of the total population in Wattwil, as of 2000, the highest education level completed by 1,999 people (24.2% of the population) was Primary, while 2,765 (33.5%) have completed their secondary education, 745 (9.0%) have attended a Tertiary school, and 488 (5.9%) are not in school. The remainder did not answer this question.

== Sights ==
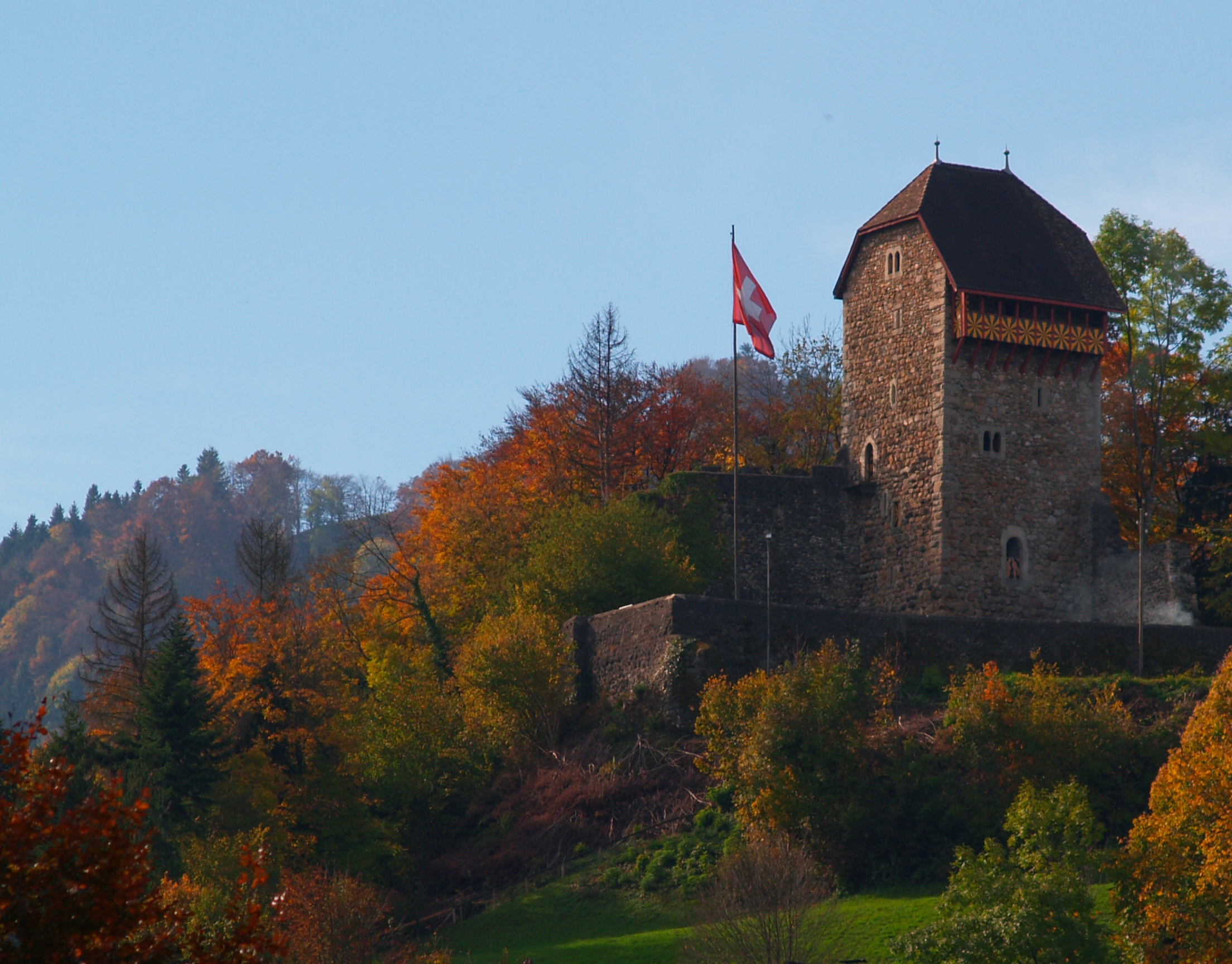
Burg Iberg

The villages of Wattwil and Lichtensteig are designated as part of the Inventory of Swiss Heritage Sites. There are several notable buildings in the municipality, including a church, a former abbey, and Burg Iberg. The Neoclassical Reformed church of Wattwil was built in 1845-48 and restored in 1969. The former Capuchin abbey, St. Mary of the Angels, was built as a walled monastery. The abbey church was built in 1622. The Choir and Lay brothers nave were rebuilt in 1780, and the entryway was built in 1893. The majority of the abbey was built in 1730-82. Burg Iberg (Castle Iberg) was built in 1240 by Heinrich von Iberg. It was damaged during the Appenzell Wars in 1405 and soon thereafter rebuilt. Some of the housing was demolished in 1835, but the roof and battlements are new.

== Economy ==
As of 2007, Wattwil had an unemployment rate of 1.75%. As of 2005, there were 383 people employed in the primary economic sector and about 164 businesses involved in this sector. 1,608 people are employed in the secondary sector and there are 108 businesses in this sector. 2,421 people are employed in the tertiary sector, with 300 businesses in this sector.

As of October 2009 the average unemployment rate was 4.0%. There were 544 businesses in the municipality of which 108 were involved in the secondary sector of the economy while 282 were involved in the third.

As of 2000 there were 2,520 residents who worked in the municipality, while 1,621 residents worked outside Wattwil and 1,937 people commuted into the municipality for work.

== Transport ==
Wattwil railway station lies at the intersection between the Bodensee–Toggenburg railway line, which links it with the Lake Constance area and the upper Toggenburg valley, and the Uznach–Wattwil railway, which connects it with the Linth Plain via the Ricken Tunnel. The station is the major hub for train and bus services in the Toggenburg. The station is served by regional trains of St. Gallen S-Bahn and the InterRegio Voralpen-Express. The latter provides long-distance services to St. Gallen and to Arth-Goldau and Luzern, bypassing Zurich.

The BLWE provides bus services between Lichtensteig and Ebnat-Kappel via Wattwil. PostBus Switzerland operates a bus line to the upper part of the valley.

== Religion ==
From the 2000 census, 3,319 or 40.2% are Roman Catholic, while 2,879 or 34.8% belonged to the Swiss Reformed Church. Of the rest of the population, there are 2 individuals (or about 0.02% of the population) who belong to the Christian Catholic faith, there are 215 individuals (or about 2.60% of the population) who belong to the Orthodox Church, and there are 245 individuals (or about 2.96% of the population) who belong to another Christian church. There are 4 individuals (or about 0.05% of the population) who are Jewish, and 807 (or about 9.76% of the population) who are Islamic. There are 104 individuals (or about 1.26% of the population) who belong to another church (not listed on the census), 444 (or about 5.37% of the population) belong to no church, are agnostic or atheist, and 246 individuals (or about 2.98% of the population) did not answer the question.

== Notable people ==
- Johann Georg Birnstiel, Swiss Reformed minister and writer

== See also ==
- Municipalities of the canton of St. Gallen
