= Chäserrugg =

Mountain in Switzerland

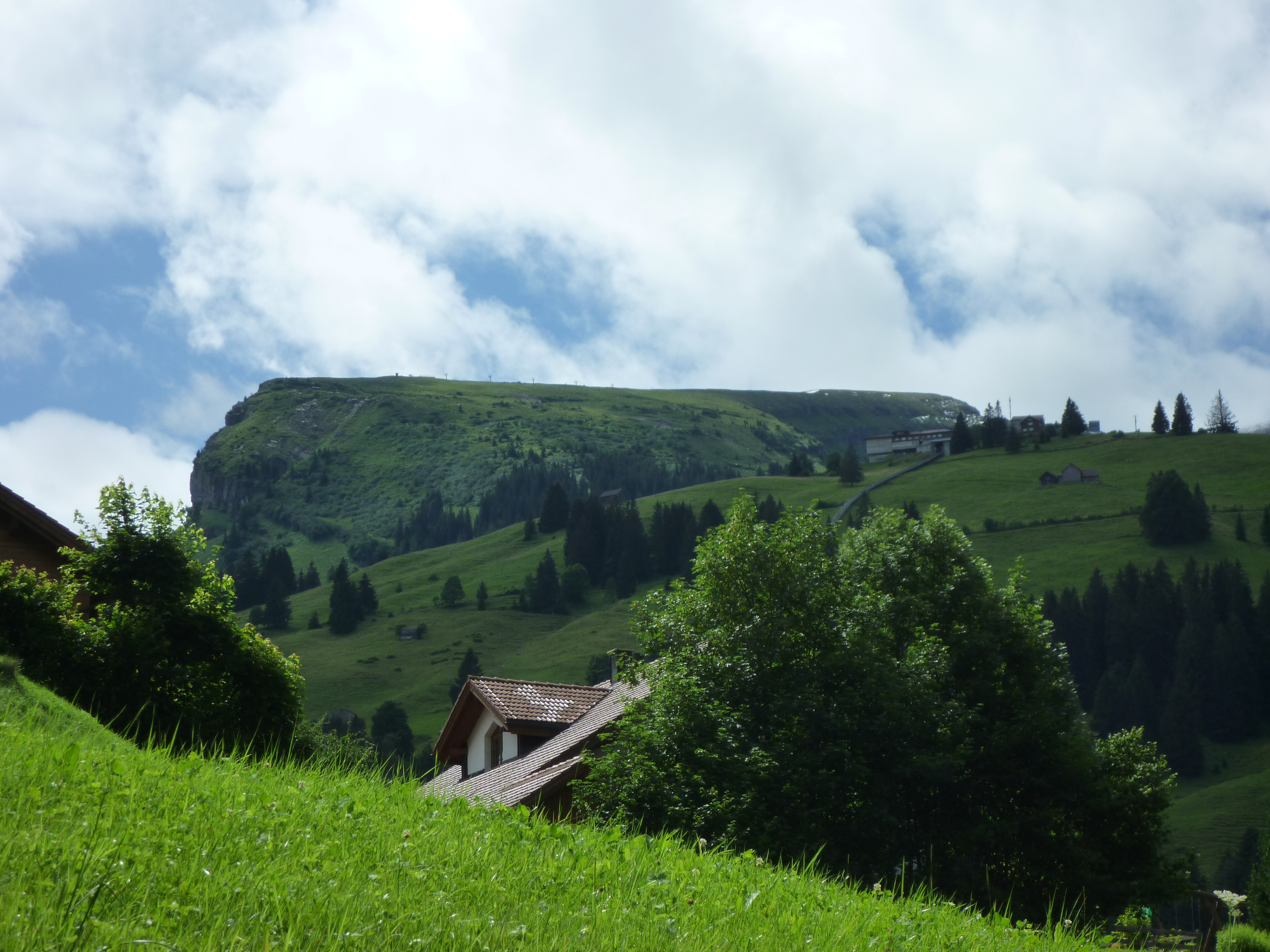

Highest point
- Elevation: 2,262 m (7,421 ft)
- Prominence: 14 m (46 ft)
- Parent peak: Hinterrugg
- Coordinates: 47°9′18″N 9°18′46″E

Geography
- Location within Switzerland Location within Canton of St. Gallen
- Location: Toggenburg, St. Gallen
- Country: Switzerland
- Parent range: Churfirsten

The Chäserrugg (or Käserrugg) is a mountain of the Appenzell Alps located in the Wildhaus-Alt St. Johann municipality (Toggenburg region) in the canton of St. Gallen, Switzerland, rising to 2,262 metres (7,421 ft) above sea level.

It is the easternmost of the "seven peaks" of the Churfirsten, the other six being, running east to west, the Hinterrugg (2,306 m (7,566 ft)), Schibenstoll (2,234 m (7,329 ft)), Zuestoll (2,235 m (7,333 ft)), Brisi (2,279 m (7,477 ft)), Frümsel (2,263 m (7,425 ft)), Selun (2,205 m (7,234 ft)). In spite of it being counted among the "seven peaks", it has a modest prominence of just 14 m (46 ft), forming part of the ridge ascending to Hinterrugg. The mountain overlooks Lake Walen (Walensee) and Seez Valley to the south and the Thur Valley and Alpstein range to the north.

== Name ==
The mountain's name translates to "cheesemaker's ridge" and is properly the name of the ridge ascending towards it from the north, (Note: So indicated (as Käserrugg) on the Siegfried Map) beginning at Ruggschöpf at about 1,800 m (5,900 ft) and was only transferred to the "peak" when the "seven Churfirsten" were systematized in the late 19th or early 20th century; in the 19th century, there was also a fashion of etymologizing the name of the Churfirsten range as Kurfürsten (lit. 'prince-electors'), which occasionally inspired a name variant Kaiserruck (lit. 'emperor's back') for the Chäserrugg.

== Transport ==
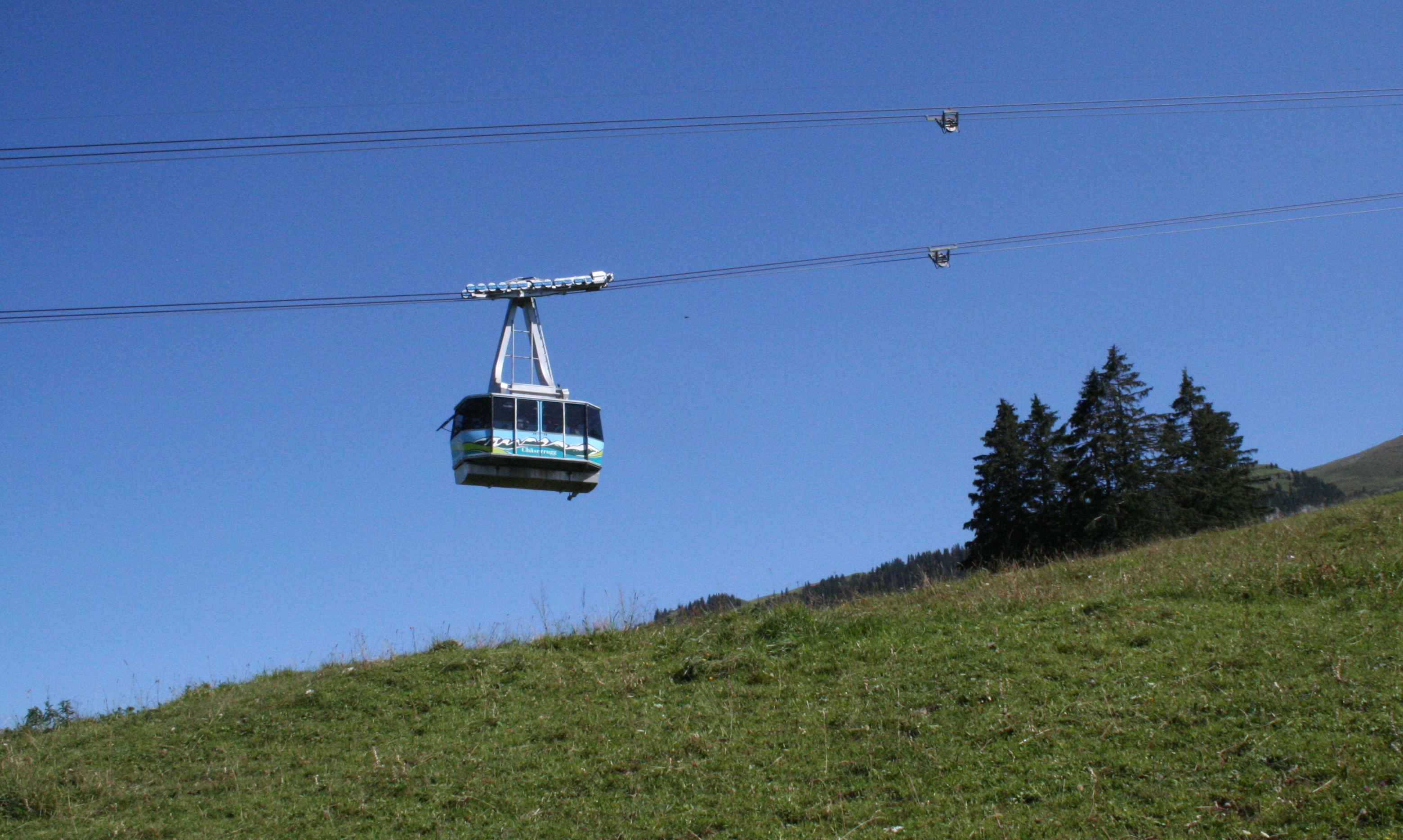
Iltios-Chäserrugg cable car

Part of Toggenburg's ski resort, it is reached from Unterwasser, at 911 m (2,989 ft), by the Iltiosbahn, a funicular opened in 1934, to Iltios, situated at 1,339 m (4,393 ft), and from there by a cable car, which opened in 1972. Unterwasser is connected by a PostAuto bus line to Buchs SG, Nesslau-Neu St. Johann and Wattwil railway stations.

== See also ==
- List of mountains of Switzerland accessible by public transport
- List of mountains of the canton of St. Gallen
- Tourism in Switzerland
