= Leistchamm =

Mountain in Switzerland

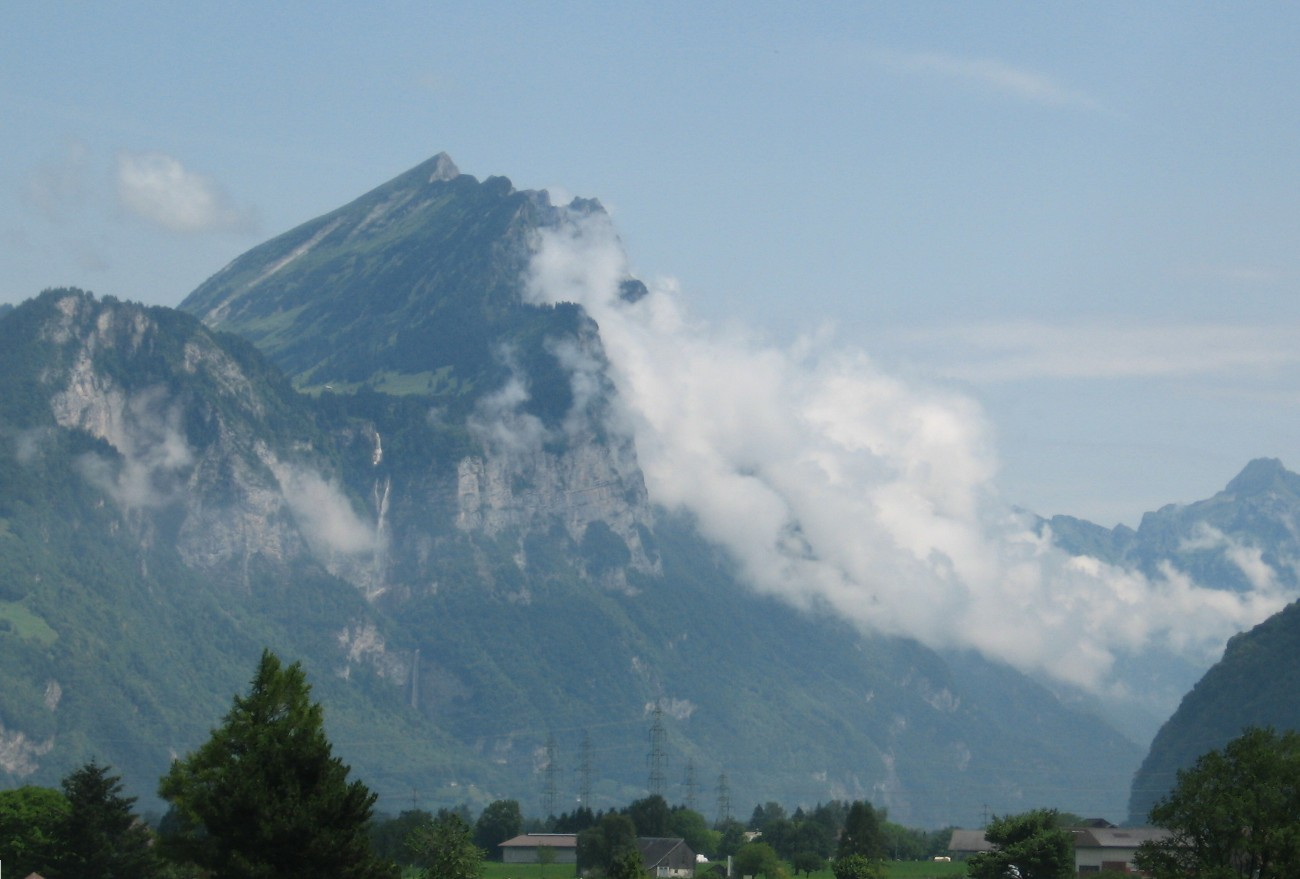
- View from the west side

Highest point
- Elevation: 2,101 m (6,893 ft)
- Prominence: 149 m (489 ft)
- Parent peak: Hinterrugg
- Coordinates: 47°08′45.5″N 9°12′48″E

Geography
- Location within Switzerland Location within Canton of St. Gallen
- Location: St. Gallen
- Country: Switzerland
- Parent range: Appenzell Alps

The Leistchamm (2,101 m [6,893 ft]) is a mountain of the Appenzell Alps, located east of Amden in the canton of St. Gallen. It lies to the west of the Churfirsten range, overlooking the Lake Walen (Walensee).

The border of the cantonal districts of See-Gaster and Sarganserland runs along the mountain's crest. Quinten, a car-free village, is located below Leistchamm on the northern shore of Lake Walen. The Seerenbach Falls lie to the west of the mountain.

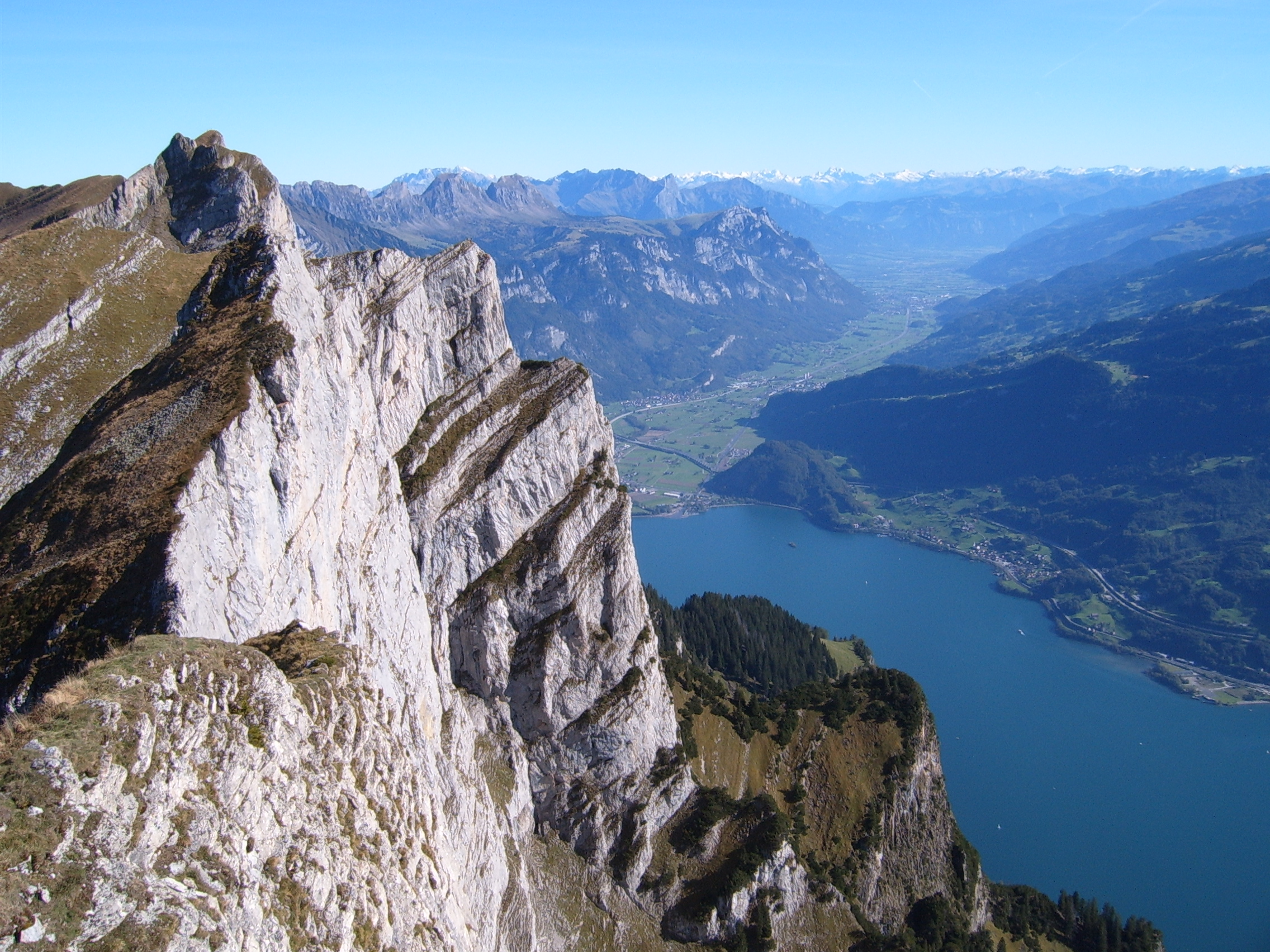
View from the summit towards south-east, over Lake Walen and Seez Valley

== See also ==
- List of mountains of the canton of St. Gallen
