= Zuestoll =

Mountain in Switzerland

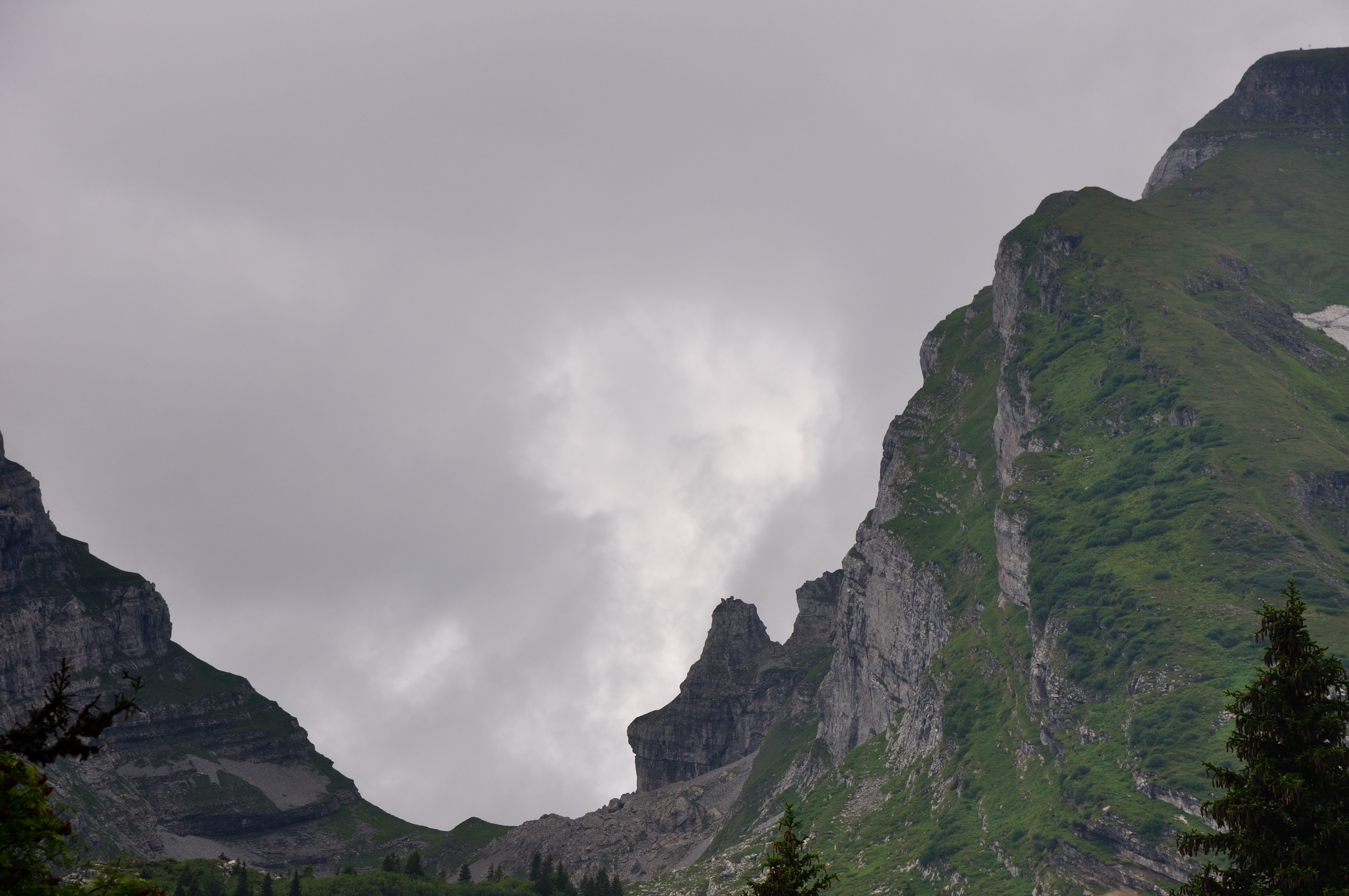
- The Zuestoll (right) seen from the north side

Highest point
- Elevation: 2,235 m (7,333 ft)
- Prominence: 225 m (738 ft)
- Parent peak: Brisi
- Coordinates: 47°9′16″N 9°17′09″E

Geography
- Location within Switzerland Location within Canton of St. Gallen
- Location: St. Gallen
- Country: Switzerland
- Parent range: Appenzell Alps

The Zuestoll is one of the peaks of the Churfirsten group, located in the Appenzell Alps. It lies between the valley of Toggenburg and Lake Walenstadt in the canton of St. Gallen. The summit is easily accessible by a trail on the northern side.

== See also ==
- List of mountains of the canton of St. Gallen
