= Selun =

Mountain in Switzerland

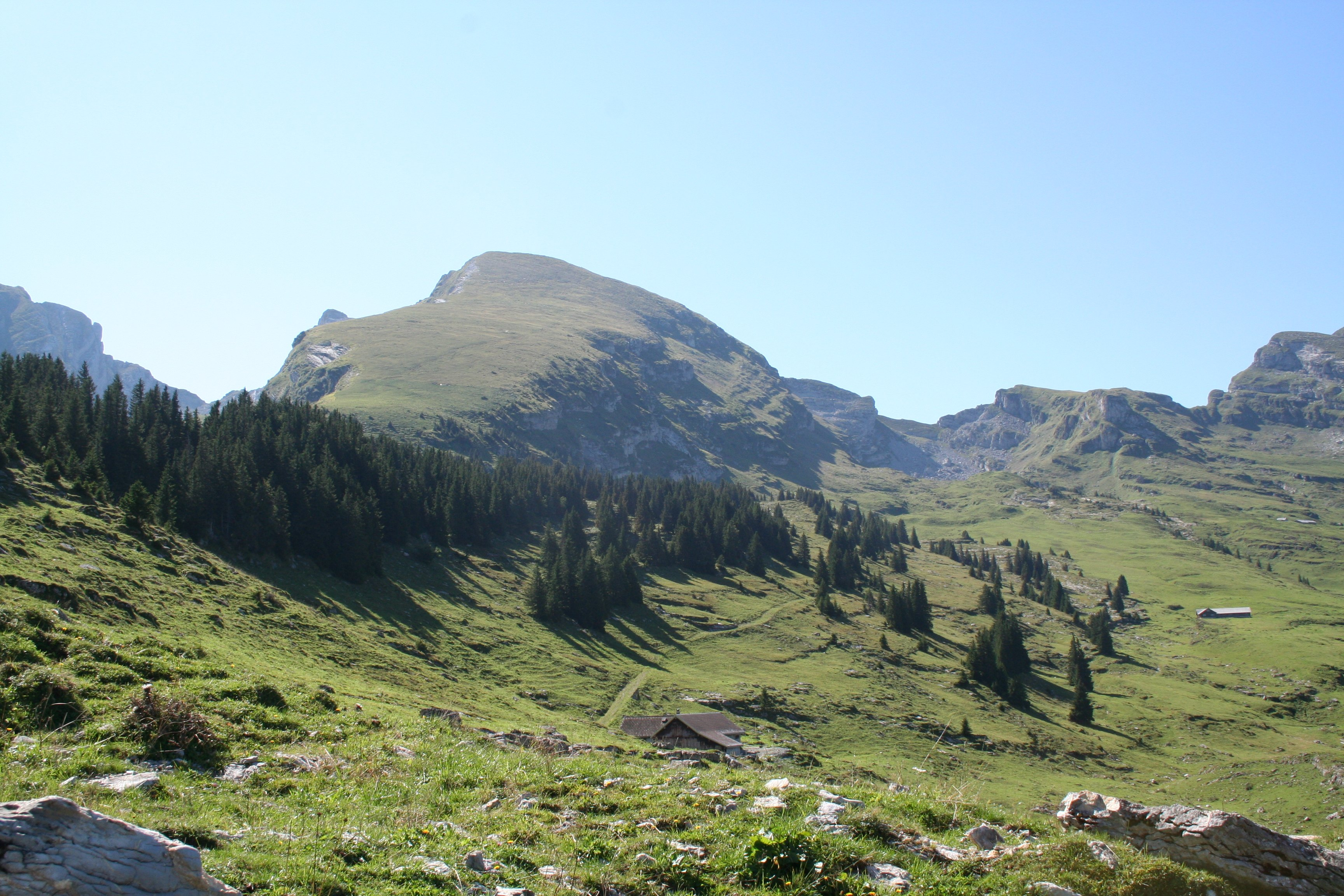
- Selun peak in the background, with Vorderselun (Vorder Selunalp) in the foreground

Highest point
- Elevation: 2,205 m (7,234 ft)
- Prominence: 158 m (518 ft)
- Parent peak: Frümsel
- Coordinates: 47°9′10″N 9°15′20″E

Geography
- Location within Switzerland Location within Canton of St. Gallen
- Location: St. Gallen
- Country: Switzerland
- Parent range: Churfirsten, Appenzell Alps

The Selun is one of the peaks of the Churfirsten range, located in the Appenzell Alps. It lies between the valley of Toggenburg and Lake Walenstadt in the canton of St. Gallen. The summit is easily accessible by a trail on the northern side.

== Name ==
The peak is named for the extended alpine pasture Selunalp to the peak's north-west, situated above ca. 1,700 m (5,600 ft). The name's etymology is uncertain, possibly from a *sellonem (Latin sella) "saddle". Named for Selunalp is Johannes Seluner (c. 1828–1898) who was found in 1844 as a feral child living in Wildenmannlisloch cave.

== See also ==
- List of mountains of the canton of St. Gallen
