= Schibenstoll =

Mountain in Switzerland

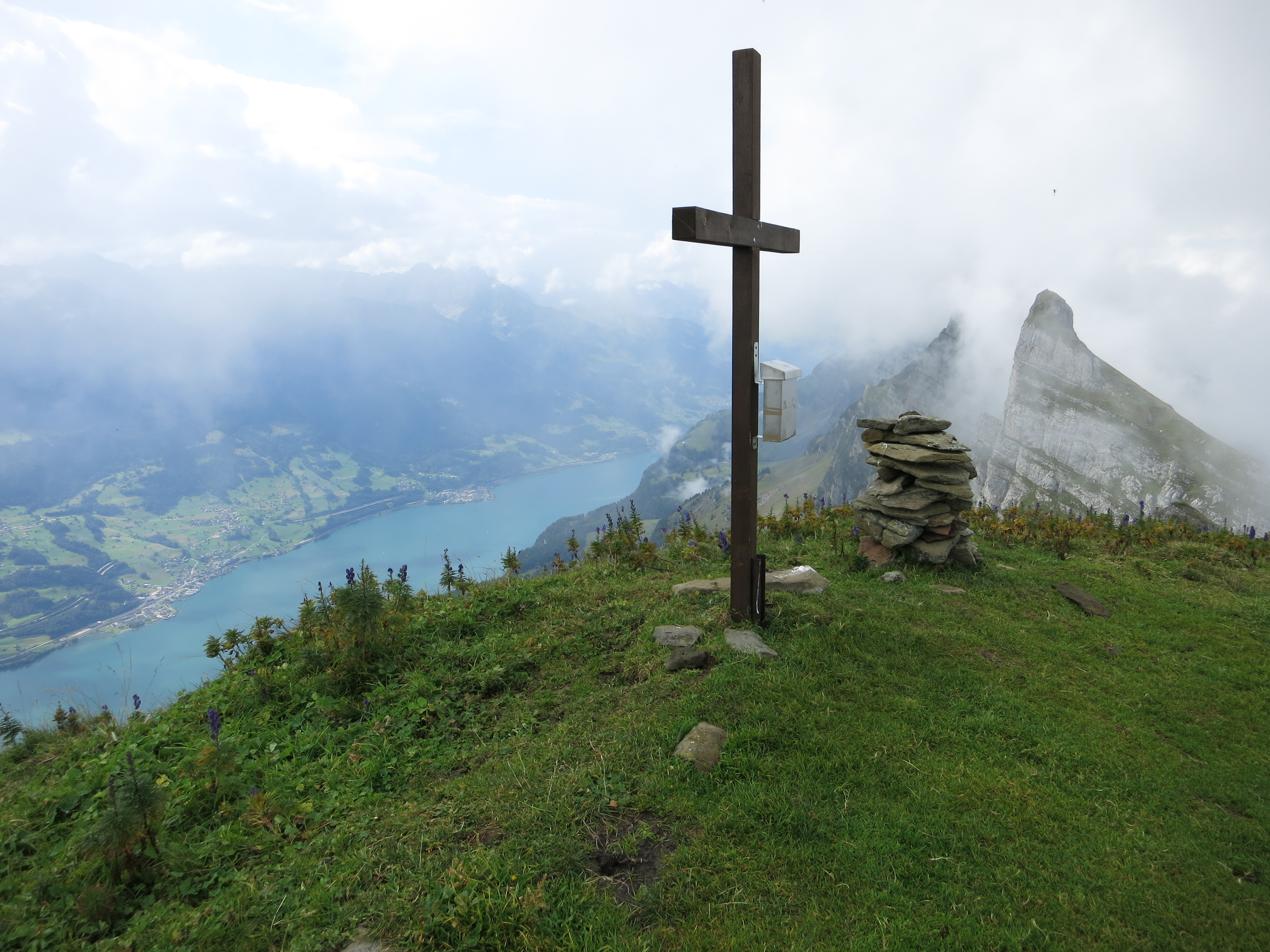
- Summit

Highest point
- Elevation: 2,236 m (7,336 ft)
- Prominence: 191 m (627 ft)
- Parent peak: Hinterrugg
- Coordinates: 47°9′18″N 9°17′43″E

Geography
- Location within Switzerland Location within Canton of St. Gallen
- Location: St. Gallen
- Country: Switzerland
- Parent range: Appenzell Alps

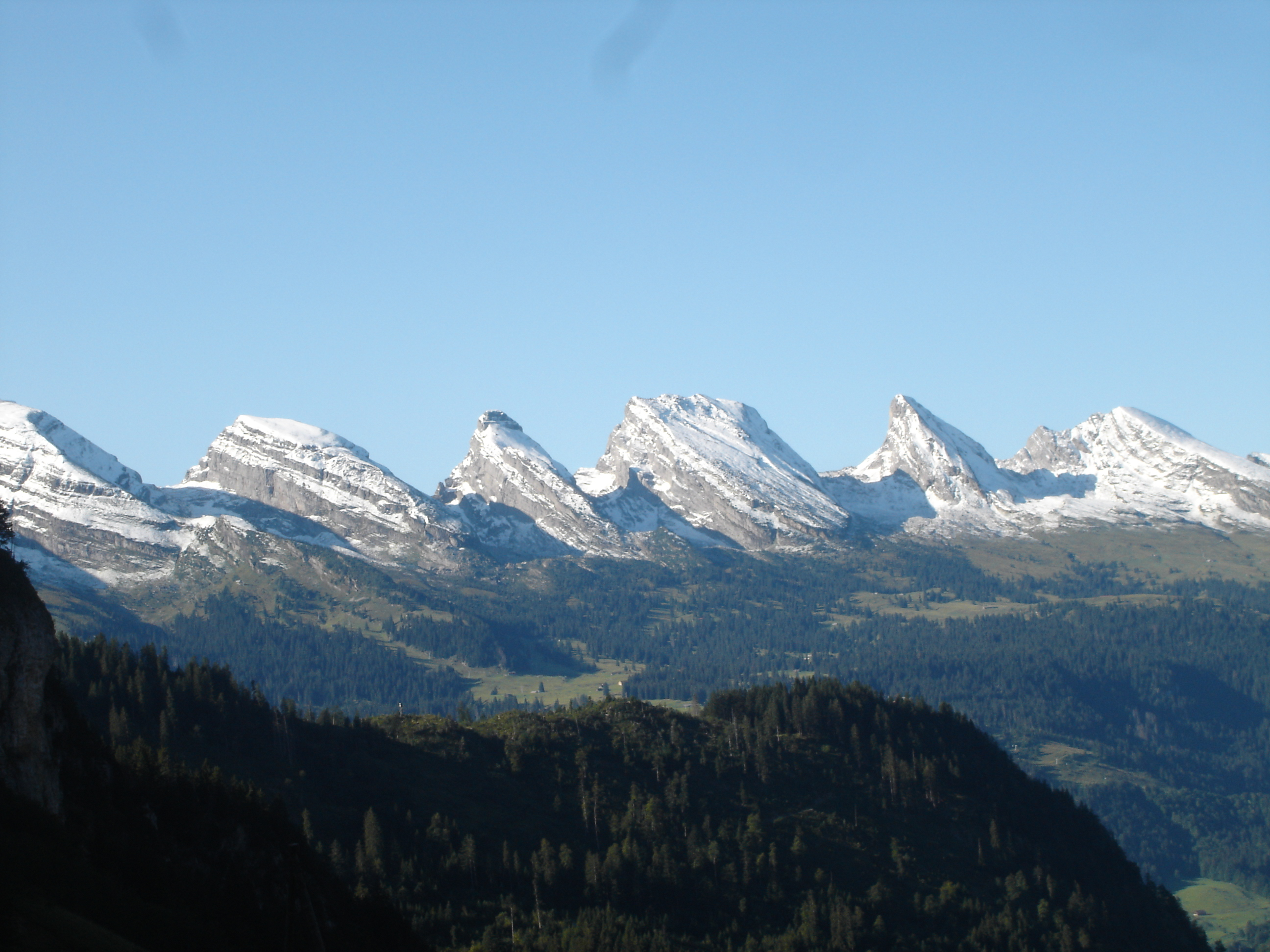
The Churfirsten: Hinterrugg, Schibenstoll, Zuestoll, Brisi, Frümsel and Selun (from left to right). Photo taken below the Rotstein Pass, Alpstein

The Schibenstoll (or Scheibenstoll) is one of the peaks of the Churfirsten group, located in the Appenzell Alps. It lies between the valley of Toggenburg and Lake Walenstadt in the canton of St. Gallen. The summit is easily accessible by a trail on the northern side.

== See also ==
- List of mountains of the canton of St. Gallen
