= Paula Rueß =

German political activist

Paula Rueß (née Kopp; 3 May 1902 – 8 August 1980) was a German political activist (KPD). Forced into exile by the Nazi takeover, during the early 1940s she worked with the French Resistance.

== Life ==
Paula Kopp was born in Lichtensteig, a small town in the Swiss Canton of St. Gallen, a short distance from the three-way frontier with Germany and Austria. At the age of 21 she was already a member of the Communist Party of Germany. From 1928 she was working at Berlin in the secretariat at the international office of the Young Communists. From here she moved on to a job as a typist in the press department of the party central committee's own secretariat. She married Hermann Nuding in 1923 or 1925. The Nazi takeover in January 1933 was quickly followed by the switch to a one-party state, and at the end of February 1933, following the Reichstag fire, Hermann Nuding was among the first of a large batch of German communists to be arrested and placed in "protective custody". Political work was now illegal and, as a paid official of the Communist Party, Paula Nuding accordingly lost her job and faced state persecution. She escaped via Copenhagen to France where Paris was rapidly becoming an ad hoc headquarters for the German Communist Party in exile. In Paris she worked on distribution for the "illegally" produced German language communist newspaper Volk und Vaterland and for the Comintern.

Following the outbreak of the Second World War in the late summer of 1939, France was invaded by the German army in May/June 1940: the northern part of the country was directly occupied while the south was administered by a collaborationist government. In this context large numbers of exiled German communists in Paris were identified as enemy aliens and arrested in the summer of 1940. Paula Nuding was one of these, and was taken to the internment camp at Rieucros in the south. Under circumstances that remain far from clear she was nevertheless among those who escaped or were released from Rieucros during 1941, and she returned to Paris.

Between November 1941 and November 1943 she worked underground in Paris as a member of the local German communist leadership, and was involved in illegally contributing to and producing newspapers and leaflets on behalf of the liberation movement ("Komitee Freies Deutschland für den Westen"). At the end of November 1943 Paula Nuding was arrested by the Gestapo. She was pregnant at the time, but as a result of physical mistreatment she lost her child. On 13 August 1944 she was taken, as part of the final transport of approximately 800 women, from France to the Ravensbrück concentration camp, where she was registered as prisoner number 57,895. The concentration camp was liberated by the Soviet army in April 1945, and Paula Nuding made her way, not without difficulties and hold-ups, to Esslingen am Neckar, a town near Stuttgart which by the end of the war in May 1945 had ended up not in the Soviet occupation zone but in the US zone.

By this time Paula and Hermann Nuding's marriage had ended in divorce. Esslingen was the home town of another former and current communist activist Hans Rueß (1901–1974)) whom she married in 1947. Hans Rueß had spent the Nazi years in Germany, interned in a succession of concentration camps. Paula Rueß had been deprived of her German citizenship during the Nazi years, and she had to struggle with the authorities in what would become West Germany for more than a year to recover it.

During the postwar period Paula Rueß resumed her political activities and became a trades union secretary. She was one of the founding members of the Democratic Women's League of Germany ("Demokratischer Frauenbund Deutschlands" / DFD) and campaigned for restitution on behalf of former concentration camp inmates. She also involved herself in the peace movement and with the Union of Persecutees of the Nazi Regime ("Vereinigung der Verfolgten des Naziregimes – Bund der Antifaschistinnen und Antifaschisten" / VVN-BdA).

During the 1950s the West German Federal Constitutional Court placed a ban on the Communist Party of Germany, but as cold war tensions eased marginally it proved possible to launch a modified version of it in 1968, and she was an early member of the German Communist Party. In the local election of 1975 she was a candidate for the party.
