= Churfirsten =

Mountain range in Switzerland

Churfirsten (Electors)
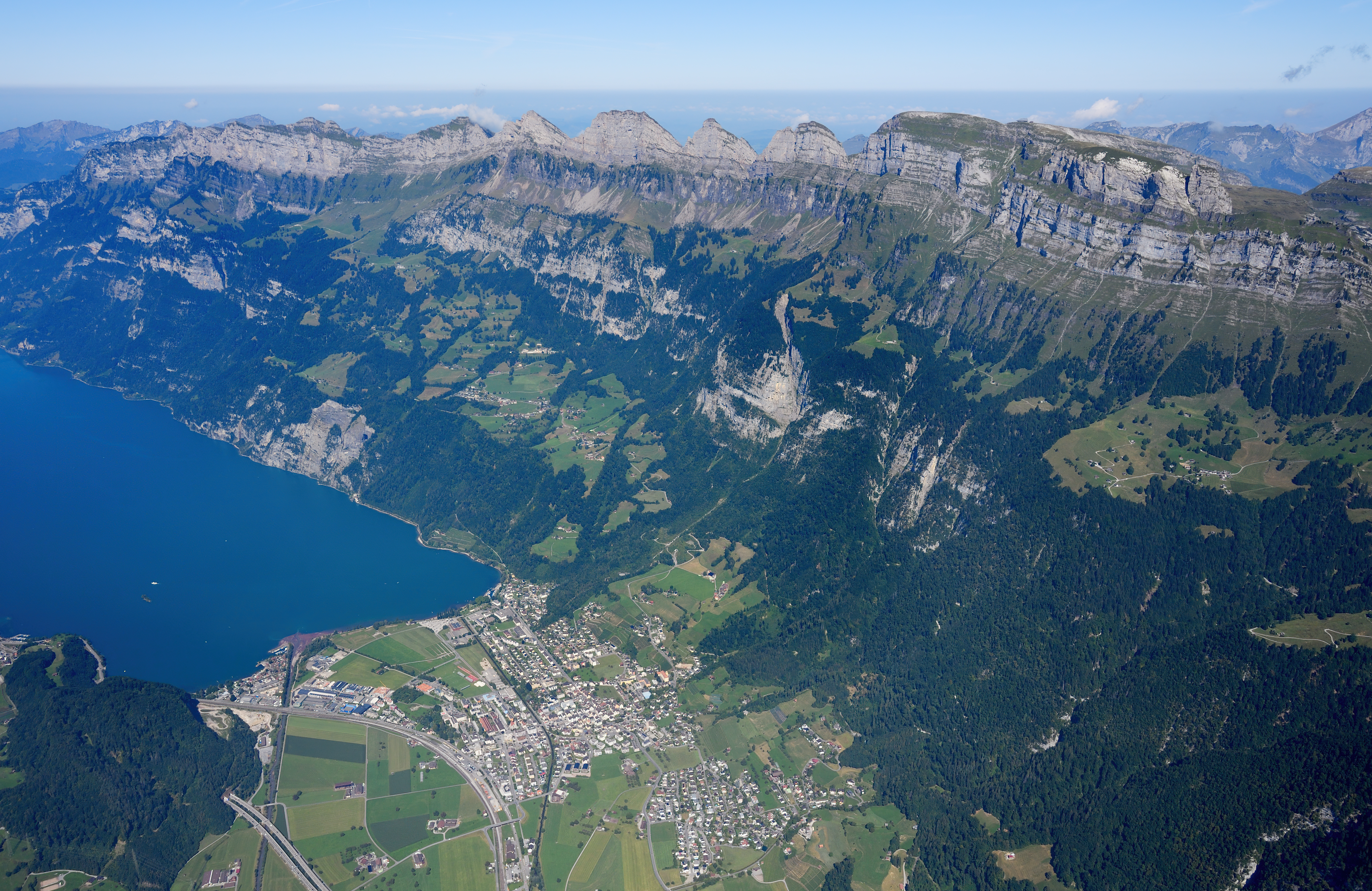
- The Churfirsten range as seen from the southeast (in August 2025); from right to left: Tristencholben, Chäserrugg, Hinderrugg, Schibenstoll, Zuestoll, Brisi, Frümsel and Selun

Highest point
- Elevation: 2,306 m (7,566 ft)
- Coordinates: 47°9′7″N 9°17′53″E

Geography
- Location within Switzerland Location within Canton of St. Gallen Location within Alps
- Location: Toggenburg, St. Gallen
- Country: Switzerland
- Parent range: Appenzell Alps

The Churfirsten is a mountain range in the Swiss canton of St. Gallen. They form the natural boundary between the canton's Toggenburg and Sarganserland districts. They are the southernmost range of the Appenzell Alps, separated from the Glarus Alps by the Seez Valley and Lake Walen (Walensee).

They consist of a limestone ridge running east to west, with the individual peaks formed by erosion. The ridge is defined much more sharply to the south than to the north, with an almost vertical drop of several hundred meters towards Walenstadtberg and eventually Lake Walen at 419 metres (1,375 ft). The southern slope of the range was significantly formed by the Rhine Glacier during the Würm glaciation.

There are several hiking routes on the range. The Schwendiseen are two small lakes on the northern side of the range (below Chäserrugg). Wildenmannlisloch is a cave on the northern slope of the Selun. Quinten is a car-free village south-west of Churfirsten on the northern shore of Lake Walen.

== Name ==
The name is a plural, indicating the peaks forming the historical boundary of the bishopric of Chur. It has historically also been folk-etymologized as Kurfürsten, i.e. the 7 prince-electors of the Holy Roman Empire who in the later medieval period (until 1648) numbered seven, which in turn encouraged the count of seven main or "official" peaks.

== Peaks ==
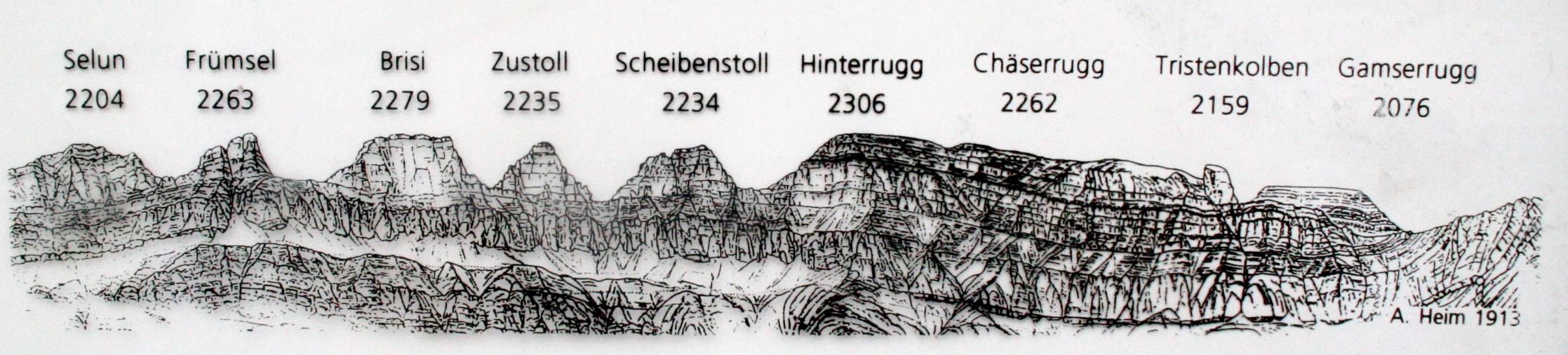
An early 20th-century drawing of the Churfirsten as seen from the south (e.g. from Flumserberg), enumerating nine peaks: Selun, Frümsel, Brisi, Zuestoll, Scheibenstoll, Hinterrugg, Chäserrugg, Tristenkolben, Gamserrugg. (A. Heim 1913)

The standard "seven peaks" of the Churfirsten are (from west to east):

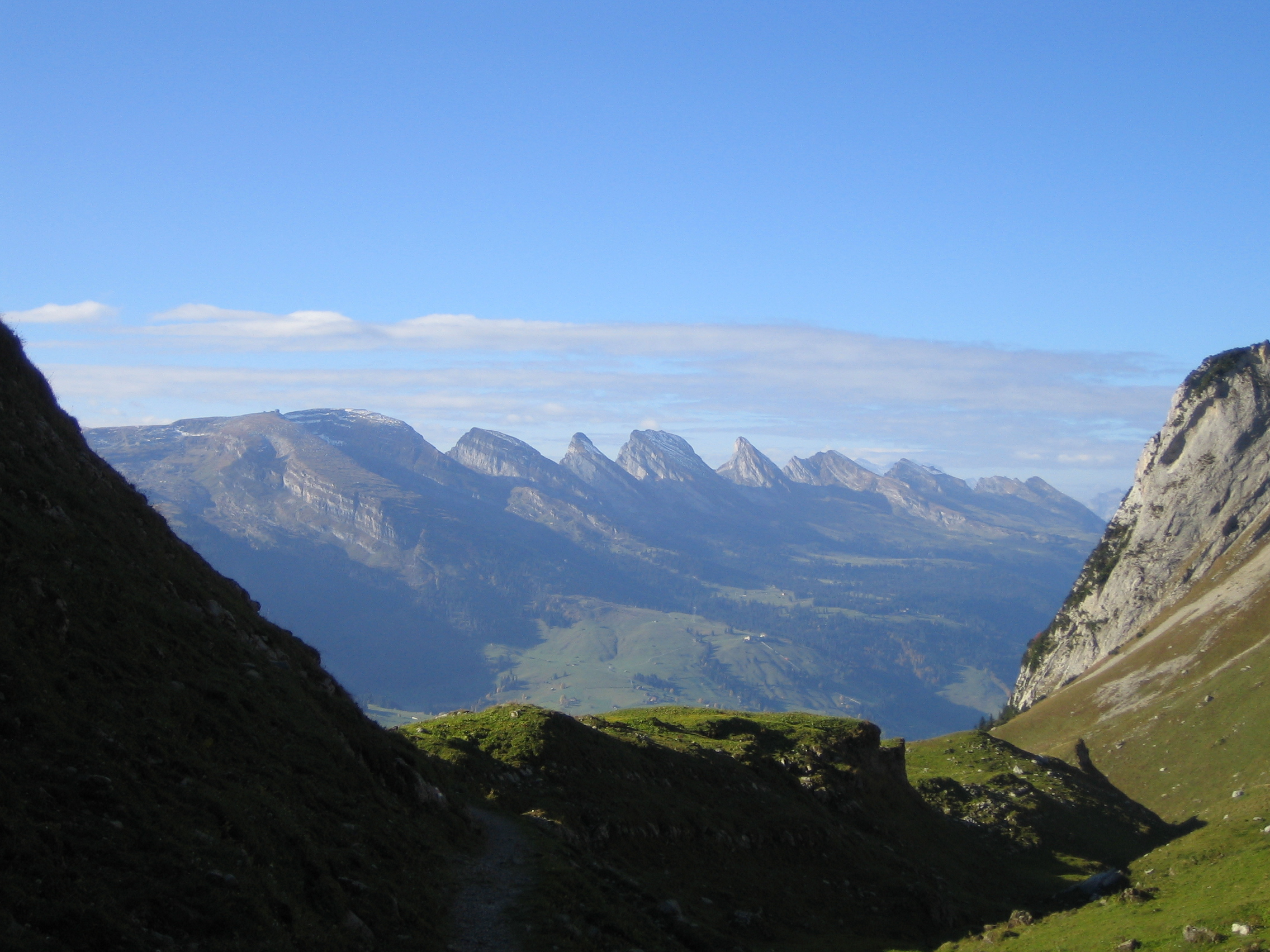
View from the north (Toggenburg)

- Selun: 2,205 m (7,234 ft)
- Frümsel: 2,263 m (7,425 ft)
- Brisi: 2,279 m (7,477 ft)
- Zuestoll: 2,235 m (7,333 ft)
- Schibenstoll: 2,234 m (7,329 ft)
- Hinterrugg: 2,306 m (7,566 ft)
- Chäserrugg: 2,262 m (7,421 ft), accessible by a funicular and aerial tram

The count of exactly seven peaks is contrived; sometimes, Chäserrugg is not included and counted as part of Hinterrugg, because of its topographical prominence of a mere 14 m (46 ft).

The Churfirsten seven peaks listed above have remarkably uniform heights, within just above a 100 m (330 ft) difference; the ridge continues both to the east and the west with a number of further peaks between 2,000 and 2,200 metres (6,600 and 7,200 ft) that are not usually included as Churfirsten:

- Peaks to the west of Selun: Wart at 2,068 m (6,785 ft), Schären (or Schäären) at 2,184 m (7,165 ft), Nägeliberg at 2,153 m (7,064 ft), Glattchamm at 2,084 m (6,837 ft), Leistchamm at 2,101 m (6,893 ft).
- Peaks to the east of Chäserrugg: Tristenkolben at 2,159 m (7,083 ft), Gamserrugg at 2,076 m (6,811 ft) (accessible by a chairlift).

== See also ==
- Alpstein
- List of mountains of the canton of St. Gallen
- Tourism in Switzerland
