= Augustine Reding =

Swiss Benedictine abbot and theological writer

Augustine Reding (born at Lichtensteig, Switzerland, 10 August 1625; died at Einsiedeln, 13 March 1692) was a Swiss Benedictine, the Prince-Abbot of Einsiedeln, and theological writer.

== Life ==
After completing the classics at the Benedictine College of Einsiedeln, Reding joined the Order of St. Benedict, December 26, 1641. He went on to teach philosophy at the early age of twenty-four. Reding was ordained priest and appointed master of novices in 1649, and obtained the degrees of Doctor of Philosophy and Theology at the University of Freiburg im Breisgau in 1654. He was professor of theology at the Benedictine University of Salzburg from 1648 to 1654. He became dean (prior) at Einsiedeln in 1658, and was finally elected Prince-Abbot of Einsiedeln on July 17, 1670.

At Einsiedeln he built the still existing choir, the confession-church, and St. Magdalene's chapel (1674–84). In 1675 his monastery took charge of the college at Bellinzona, which was conducted by the monks of Einsiedeln until its suppression in 1852. He watched carefully over discipline, and insisted on a thorough intellectual training of his monks. During his time the conventuals of Einsiedeln increased from 53 to 100, many of whom gained renown as professors at various institutions of learning.

== Works ==
His numerous theological writings are learned, but his style is dry and at times obscure. His chief work is Theologia scholastica universa (13 vols., Einsiedeln, 1687), based on the Summa of Thomas Aquinas.

Other works are:

- Veritas inextincta concilii Tridentini (5 vols., ib., 1677–84), a defence of the Council of Trent against Johann Heinrich Heidegger;
- Vindex veritatis centuriæ primæ annalium ecclesiasticorum Baronii (ib., 1680), a justification of the first century of the Annales Ecclesiastici of Baronius;
- Œcumenicæ cathedræ apostolicæ authoritas (ib., 1669), a defence of papal supremacy against the Gallican Liberties; and some works of less importance.
