= Lichtensteig =

- Municipality
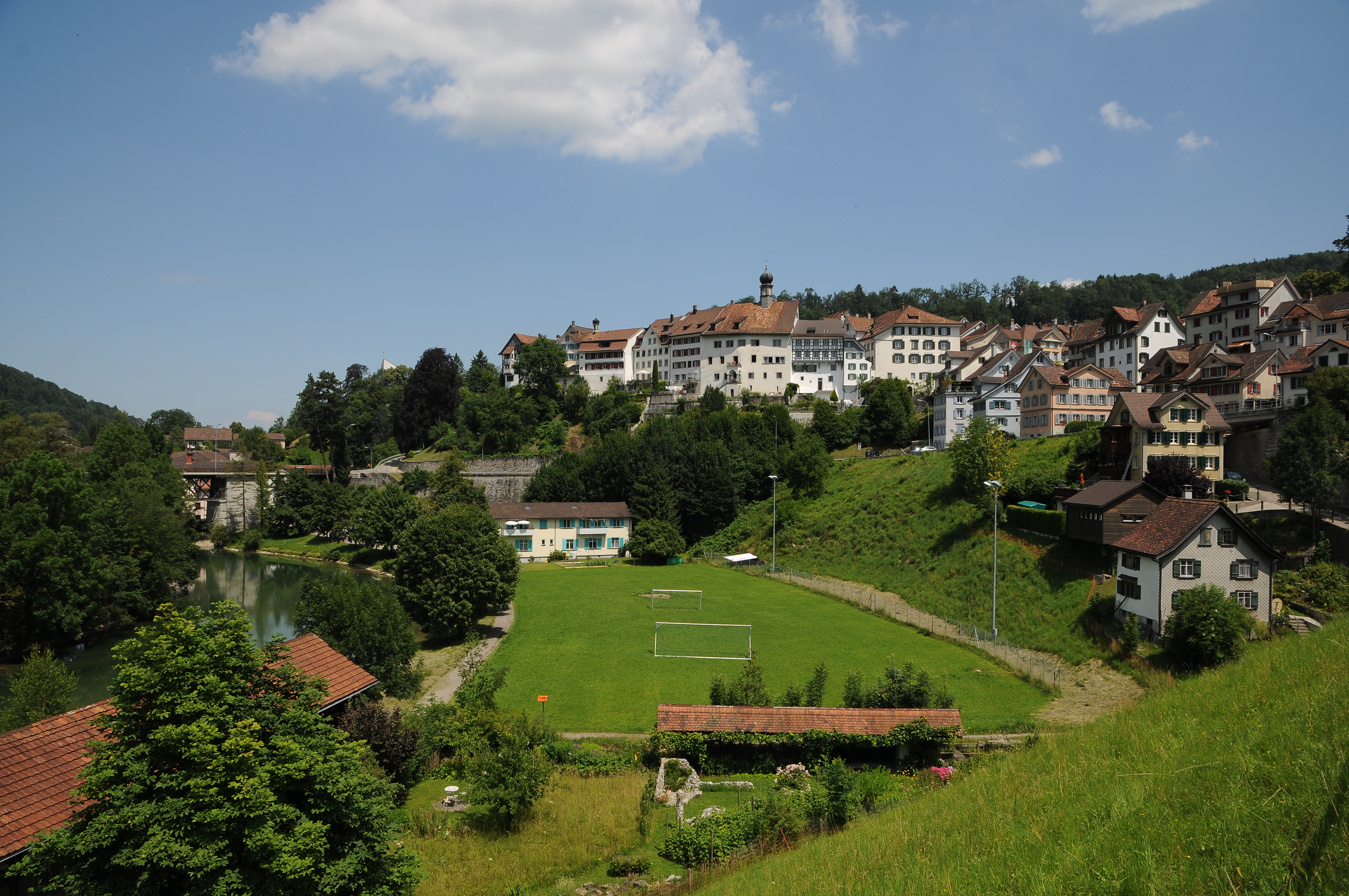

- Flag Coat of arms
- Location of Lichtensteig
- Location within Switzerland Location within Canton of St. Gallen
- Coordinates: 47°19′25.9″N 9°5′15.8″E
- Country: Switzerland
- Canton: St. Gallen
- District: Toggenburg

Government
  - Mayor: Roger Hochreutener

Area
  - Total: 2.82 km^{2} (1.09 sq mi)
- Elevation: 625 m (2,051 ft)

Population (December 2020)
  - Total: 1,879
  - Density: 666/km^{2} (1,730/sq mi)
- Time zone: UTC+01:00 (CET)
  - Summer (DST): UTC+02:00 (CEST)
- Postal code: 9620
- SFOS number: 3374
- ISO 3166 code: CH-SG
- Surrounded by: Bütschwil, Oberhelfenschwil, Wattwil
- Twin towns: Adelberg (Germany)
- Website: www.lichtensteig.ch

Lichtensteig is a municipality in the Wahlkreis (constituency) of Toggenburg in the canton of St. Gallen in Switzerland.

== History ==
Lichtensteig was founded by the counts of Toggenburg in the early 13th century, first mentioned in 1228 as Liehtunsteige. A market is mentioned in 1374, and the right to hold markets is confirmed in 1400. A letter of privileges issued by the lords of Raron 1439 confirms the existence of a council of twelve burghers, and the joint appointment of judges by the burghers and the land lords. The mayor (Schultheiss) was appointed by the land lord from a list of candidates compiled by the burghers. After the acquisition of the Toggenburg by the Abbey of St. Gallen in 1468, Lichtensteig became the seat of the abbot's reeve. Abbot Ulrich Rösch in 1469 confirmed the existing privileges of Lichtensteig. The council declared support of the Reformation in 1528. Lichtensteig church from this time was used both by Reformed and Catholics, while schools were separated by confession (until 1868). A neo-Gothic church was built in 1868, still used by both confessions, until the construction of two new churches in 1967 and 1970. Lichtensteig's importance as market town increased in the 19th century with the development of the textile home working industry in the Toggenburg. In the early 20th century, there were six yearly markets and a weekly livestock market. Connection to the railway dates to 1870. In 1874, the settlements of Blatten, Hof and Loretto, formerly Oberhelfenschwil municipality, were incorporated into Lichtensteig.

A municipal coat of arms of Per pale, or and sable was adopted in the 16th century, later changed to Per pale, gules and sable. A town seal with the letter L on the left (dexter) side and a branch ornament on the right (sinister) was in use in the 17th and 18th centuries. A flag dated 1767 shows the letter L in a red field. These elements were combined into the modern municipal coat of arms in 1946, blazoned Per pale gules and sable, overall a letter L or. The script typeface used for the letter is taken from a seal of the 16th century, preserved on a document dated 1722.

== Geography ==
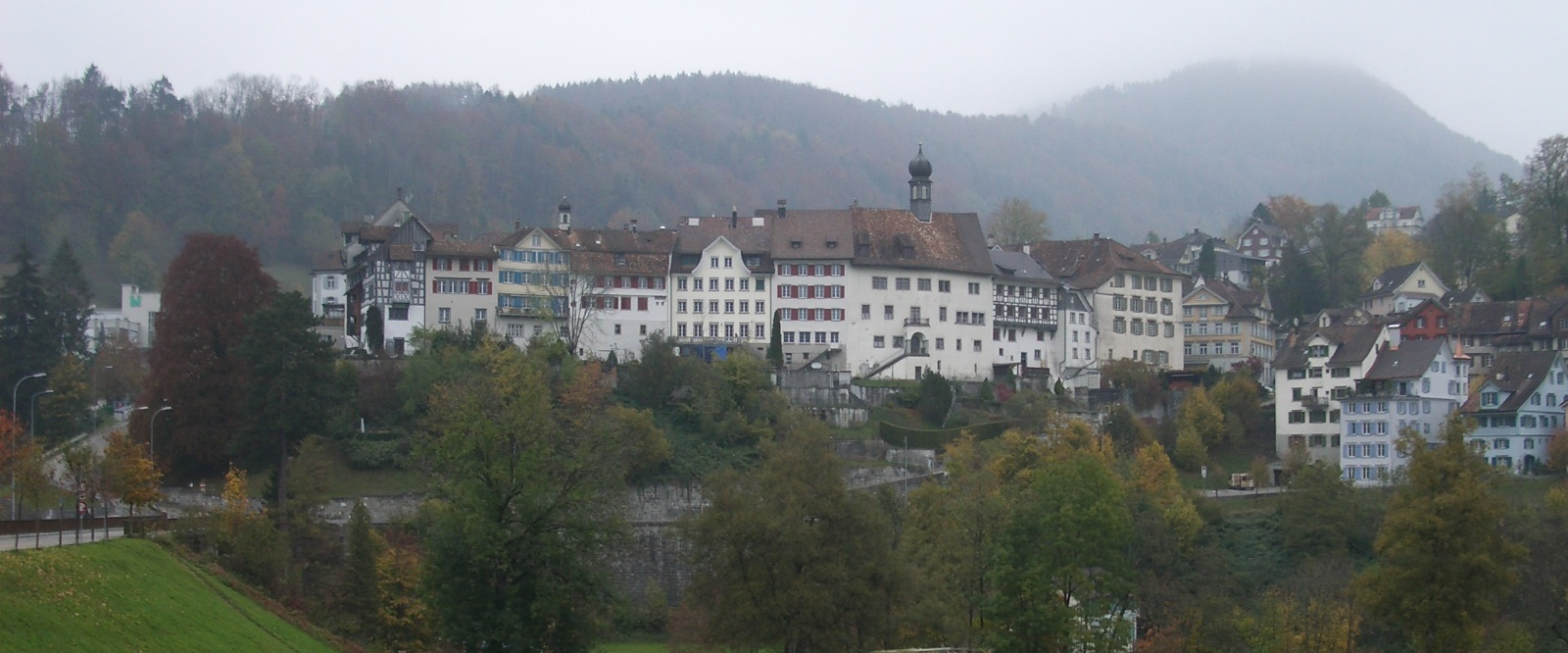
View from south

Aerial view (1946)

The municipality is located in the Toggenburg (the upper Thur basin), on the right side of the Thur. It is downstream of Wattwil, and upstream of Dietfurt (Bütschwil municipality), and on the western site of the Wasserfluh Pass. The ruins of Neu-Toggenburg castle are on a rocky outcropping above the village. Lichtensteig is the smallest municipality in Toggenburg in terms of area, with only 2.8 km^{2} (1.1 sq mi). It is 35.7% of the area used for agricultural purposes, 44.6% is forested, and 18.2% is built up, the remainder (1.4%) being accounted for by bodies of water.

The highest point is at 1,146 m (Köbelisberg), the lowst at 591 m (untere Platten).

== Demographics ==
Lichtensteig has a population (as of 31 December 2020) of 1,879. As of 2007, about 19.1% of the population was made up of foreign nationals. Of the foreign population, (as of 2000), 31 are from Germany, 82 are from Italy, 113 are from ex-Yugoslavia, 13 are from Austria, 43 are from Turkey, and 91 are from another country. Over the last 10 years the population has decreased at a rate of -5.4%. Most of the population (as of 2000) speaks German (89.6%), with Italian being second most common ( 2.7%) and Serbo-Croatian being third ( 2.0%). Of the Swiss national languages (as of 2000), 1,697 speak German, 5 people speak French, 52 people speak Italian, and 1 person speaks Romansh.

The age distribution, as of 2000, in Lichtensteig is; 188 children or 9.9% of the population are between 0 and 9 years old and 247 teenagers or 13.0% are between 10 and 19. Of the adult population, 268 people or 14.2% of the population are between 20 and 29 years old. 328 people or 17.3% are between 30 and 39, 261 people or 13.8% are between 40 and 49, and 214 people or 11.3% are between 50 and 59. The senior population distribution is 176 people or 9.3% of the population are between 60 and 69 years old, 140 people or 7.4% are between 70 and 79, there are 62 people or 3.3% who are between 80 and 89, and there are 9 people or 0.5% who are between 90 and 99.

In 2000 there were 371 persons (or 19.6% of the population) who were living alone in a private dwelling. There were 433 (or 22.9%) persons who were part of a couple (married or otherwise committed) without children, and 926 (or 48.9%) who were part of a couple with children. There were 94 (or 5.0%) people who lived in single parent home, while there are 4 persons who were adult children living with one or both parents, 22 who lived household made up of unrelated persons, and 43 who are either institutionalized or live in another type of collective housing.

In the 2007 federal election the most popular party was the SVP which received 28.1% of the vote. The next three most popular parties were the CVP (22.4%), the FDP (19.5%) and the SP (14.6%).

The entire Swiss population is generally well educated. In Lichtensteig about 69.2% of the population (between age 25 and 64) have completed either non-mandatory upper secondary education or additional higher education (either university or a Fachhochschule). Out of the total population in Lichtensteig, as of 2000, the highest education level completed by 433 people (22.9% of the population) was Primary, while 739 (39.0%) have completed their secondary education, 207 (10.9%) have attended a Tertiary school, and 83 (4.4%) are not in school. The remainder did not answer this question.

The historical population is given in the following table:

year	population
1560	c. 400
1850	875
1900	1,387
1950	1,798
2000	1,893

== Heritage sites of national significance ==
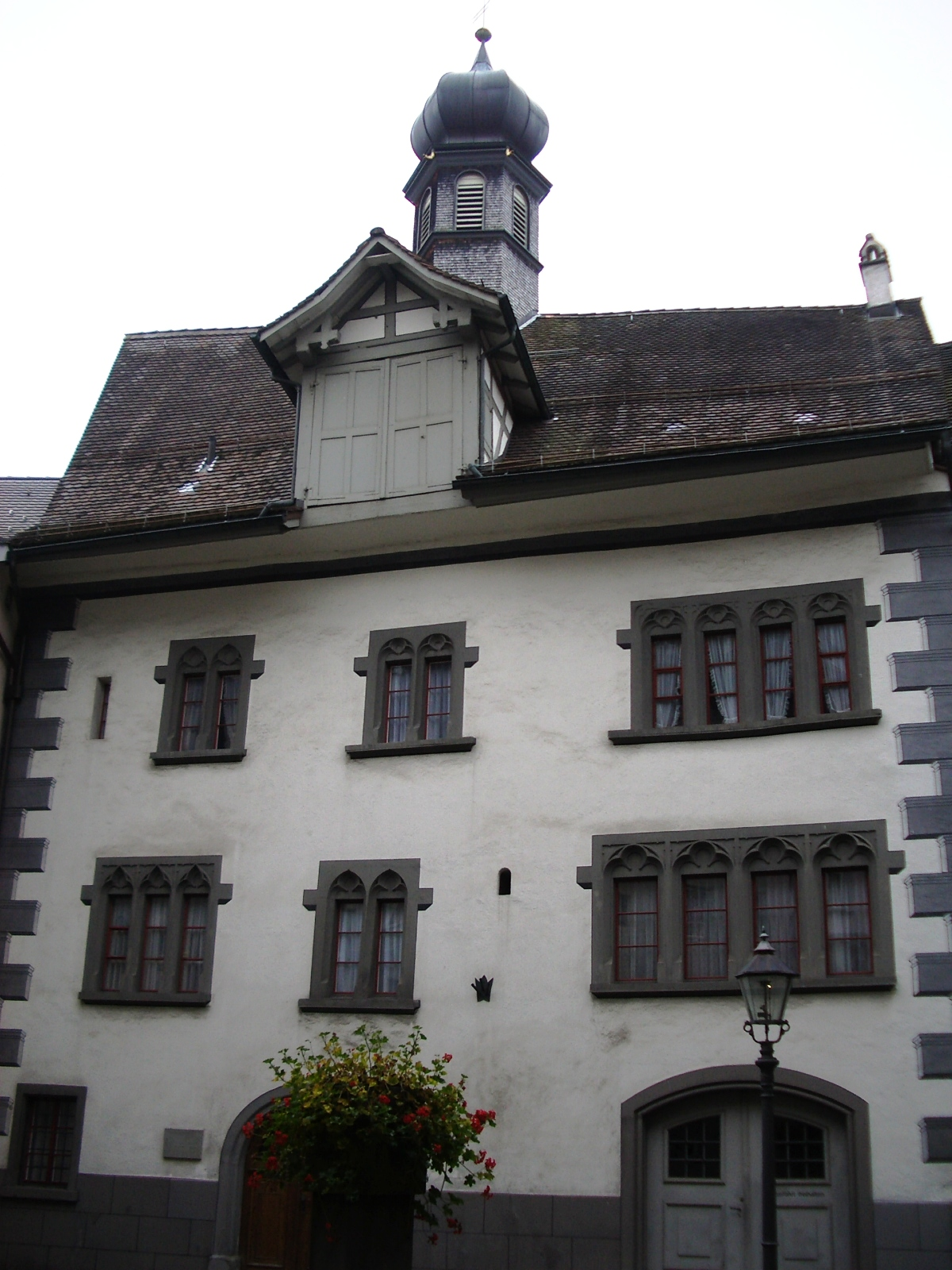
Old Town Council Building

The Old Town Council building at Hintergasse 22 is listed as a Swiss heritage site of national significance. The entire village of Lichtensteig is designated as part of the Inventory of Swiss Heritage Sites.

== Economy ==
As of 2007, Lichtensteig had an unemployment rate of 2.12%. As of 2005, there were 17 people employed in the primary economic sector and about 8 businesses involved in this sector. 340 people are employed in the secondary sector and there are 32 businesses in this sector. 309 people are employed in the tertiary sector, with 88 businesses in this sector.

As of October 2009 the average unemployment rate was 4.6%. There were 120 businesses in the municipality of which 34 were involved in the secondary sector of the economy while 82 were involved in the third.

As of 2000 there were 350 residents who worked in the municipality, while 704 residents worked outside Lichtensteig and 521 people commuted into the municipality for work.

== Religion ==
From the 2000 census, 984 or 52.0% are Roman Catholic, while 555 or 29.3% belonged to the Swiss Reformed Church. Of the rest of the population, there is 1 individual who belongs to the Christian Catholic faith, there are 46 individuals (or about 2.43% of the population) who belong to the Orthodox Church, and there are 21 individuals (or about 1.11% of the population) who belong to another Christian church. There are 95 (or about 5.02% of the population) who are Islamic. There are 32 individuals (or about 1.69% of the population) who belong to another church (not listed on the census), 109 (or about 5.76% of the population) belong to no church, are agnostic or atheist, and 50 individuals (or about 2.64% of the population) did not answer the question.

== Notable people ==
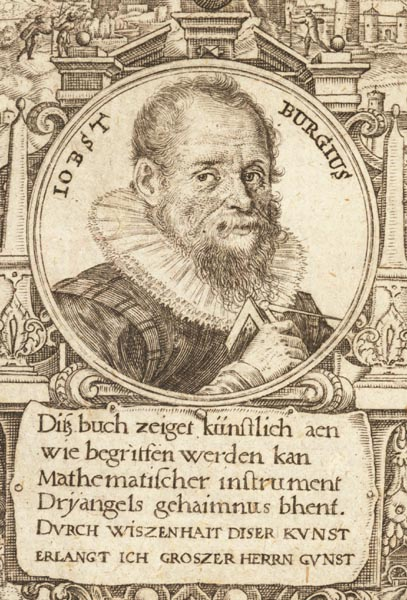
Jost Bürgi

- Jost Bürgi (1552 in Lichtensteig – 1632) a Swiss clockmaker, a maker of astronomical instruments and a mathematician.
- Augustine Reding (1625 in Lichtensteig - 1692) a Swiss Benedictine, the Prince-Abbot of Einsiedeln, and theological writer.
- Max Rychner (1897 in Lichtensteig – 1965) a Swiss writer, journalist, translator, and literary critic
- Paula Rueß (1902 in Lichtensteig - 1980) a German political activist, forced into exile by the Nazi takeover, during the early 1940s she worked with the French Resistance

== See also ==
- Lichtensteig railway station
