= Wasserfluh Pass =

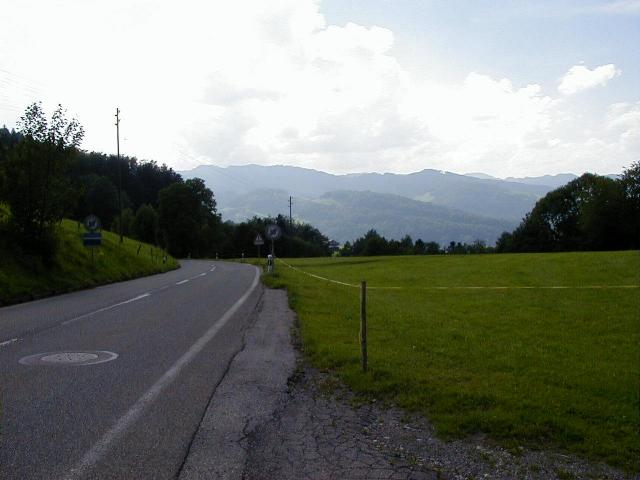
- Wasserfluh Pass
- Interactive map of Wasserfluh Pass
- Elevation: 848 metres (2,782 ft)

Third Approach
- Location: Switzerland
- Coordinates: 47°19′33.32″N 9°6′50.9″E

Wasserfluh Pass (el. 848 m.) is a mountain pass in the canton of St. Gallen in Switzerland.

It connects Lichtensteig and Brunnadern. The pass road has a maximum grade of 10 percent and an elevation gain of 345 m.

Overlooking the pass are the ruins of Neu-Toggenburg castle (47.3296°N 9.1127°E), built by the counts of Toggenburg in the late 12th century (excavated 1937/8).
