= Wildenmannlisloch =

Cave in Switzerland

- Wildmannlisloch
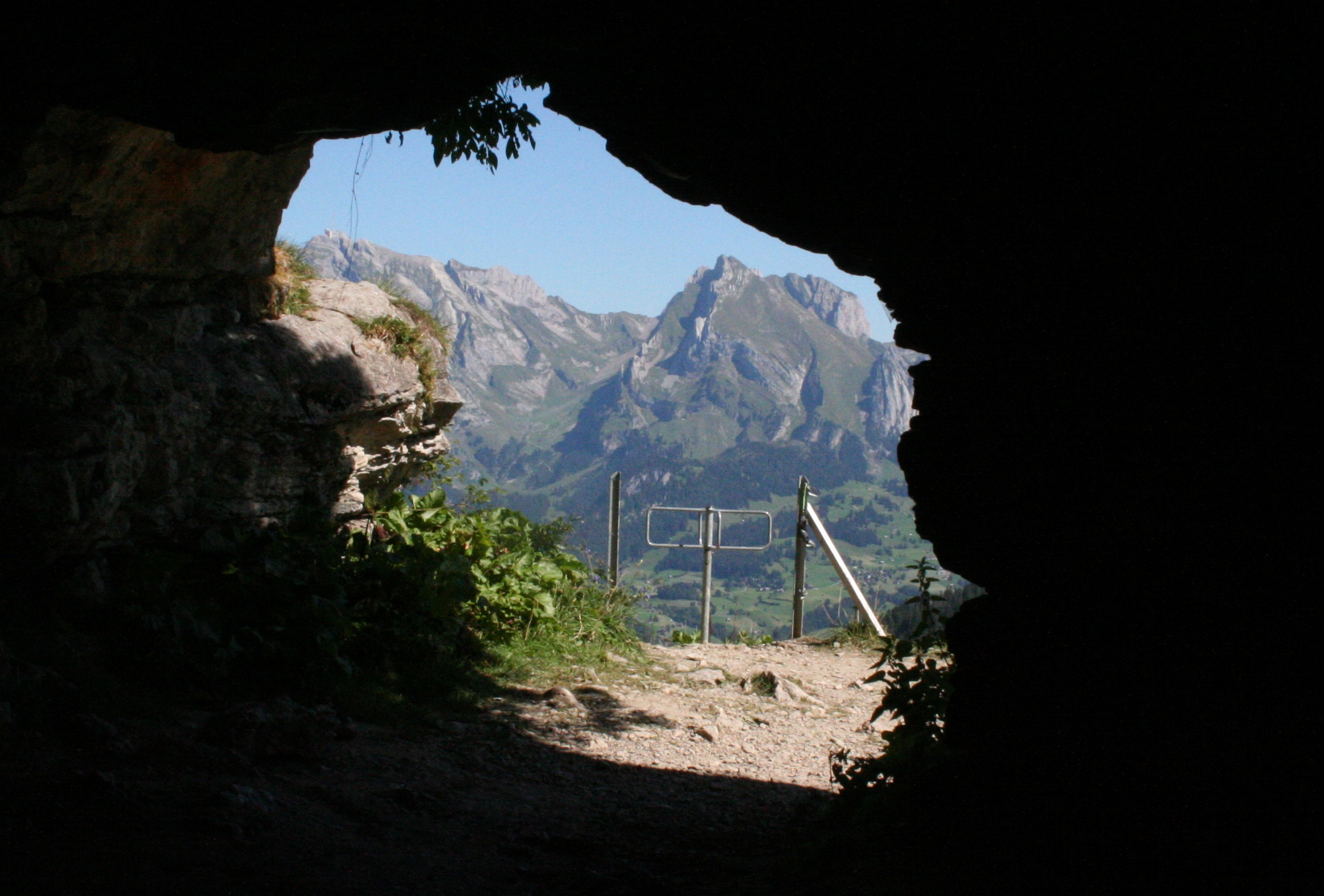
- View from the cave's entrance looking towards the Wildhuser Schafberg

- Location within Switzerland Location within Canton of St. Gallen
- Location: Wildhaus-Alt St. Johann; Canton of St. Gallen; Switzerland
- Coordinates: 47°10′4″N 9°15′19″E
- Depth: 192.1 m (630 ft)
- Elevation: 1,640 m (5,380 ft)
- Geology: Karst cave
- Entrances: 1
- Access: Public

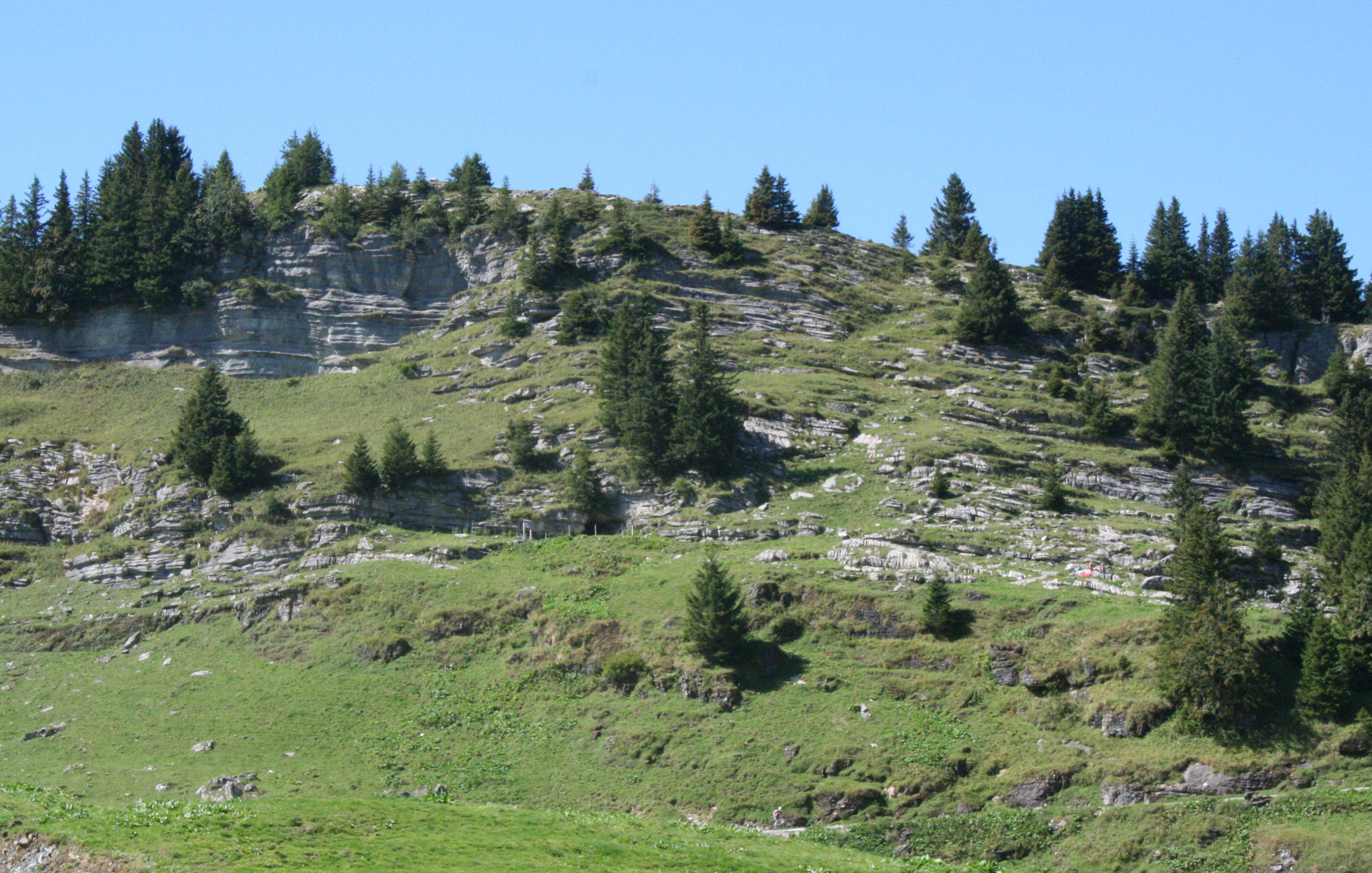
Situation of the cave's entrance

Wildenmannlisloch (also Wildmannlisloch, lit. 'little wild man's hole') is an Alpine limestone karst cave in the municipality of Wildhaus-Alt St. Johann, in the Toggenburg region of the canton of St. Gallen, Switzerland, on the northern slope of the Churfirsten range (ca. 2 km [1.2 mi] due north of Selun) peak, at an elevation of 1,640 metres (5,380 ft) a.s.l.

== Description ==
The cave extends for 192.1 metres (630 ft), forming a chamber at about 60 metres (200 ft) from the entrance.

The cave's name is recorded in 1819 a booklet on "Zwingli's birthplace" (Zwinglis Geburtsort, i.e. Wildhaus) by J. Fr. Franz: (Note: German: An dem Fusse des Selunerrückens befindet sich eine grosse Höhle, das Wildenmannlisloch genannt, die anfangs sehr weit und hoch ist, so dass man mit Pferden und Wagen hineinfahren könnte, dann wieder verenget und wieder erweitert und in solchen Abwechslungen und verschiedenen Krümmungen sich eine Viertelstunde lang hinziehet, bis man ihr Ende erreicht.) "At the foot of Selun ridge there is a great cave, known as the Wildenmannlisloch, which at first is very broad and high, so that it could by entered by horse and wagon, then becomes narrower, and again wider, and in such alternation continues along various bends for a quarter of an hour before its end is reached."

An examination of 15 July 1906 yielded bones of cave bears. A more detailed survey was conducted during 1923 to 1928, published in Bächler (1933), producing a large number of bones, mostly of bears, besides a smaller number of stone tools comparable to the Wildkirchli finds. The bones seem to have been artificially deposited in heaps. The cave was presumably in use (either inhabited or used as a storage site for meat, or as a sacrificial site) by prehistoric man during the Mousterian (about 40,000 to 35,000 years ago).

Johannes Seluner, a feral child found in 1844, presumably lived in the cave during a number of years.

== See also ==
- List of caves in Switzerland
