= Iltiosbahn =

Funicular railway in the canton of St. Gallen, Switzerland

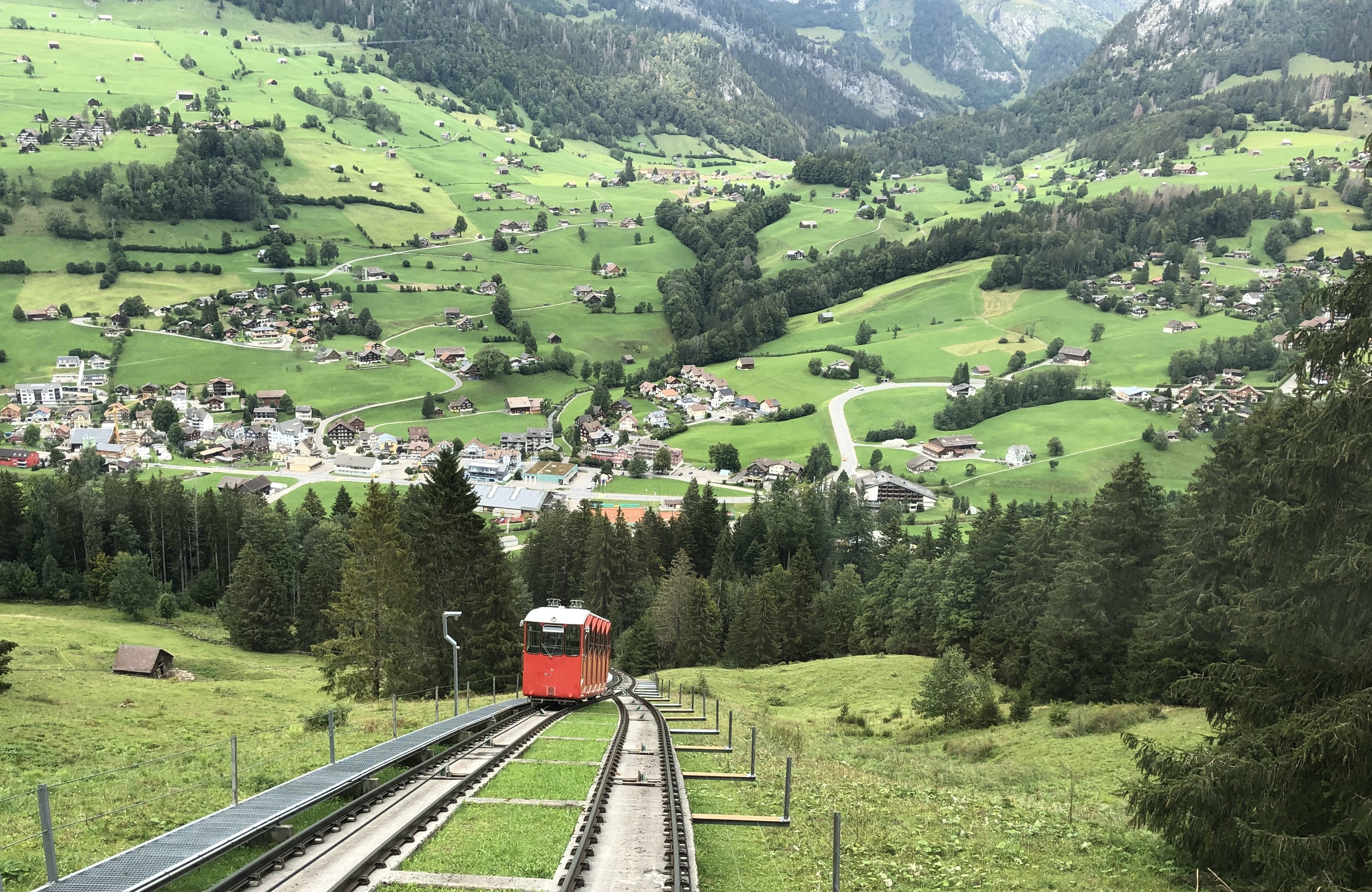
- Car at the passing loop with Unterwasser in the background (2020)

Overview
- Other names: Standseilbahn Unterwasser–Iltios; Drahtseilbahn Unterwasser-Iltios
- Status: In operation
- Owner: Toggenburg Bergbahnen AG (since 2008)
- Locale: Canton of St. Gallen, Switzerland
- Termini: "Unterwasser (Iltiosbahn)" at Frühweidstrasse 8; "Iltios"
- Stations: 2

Service
- Type: Funicular
- Route number: 2767
- Operator(s): Toggenburg Bergbahnen AG (short: TBB)
- Rolling stock: 2

History
- Opened: 26 July 1934 (91 years ago)
- Concession: 1933
- Enhancements: 2005

Technical
- Line length: 1,195 metres (3,921 ft)
- Number of tracks: 1 with passing loop
- Electrification: from opening
- Highest elevation: 1,339 m (4,393 ft)
- Maximum incline: 27%

Iltiosbahn is a funicular railway in the Canton of St. Gallen, Switzerland. It leads from Unterwasser at 911 m (2,989 ft) to Iltios at 1,339 m (4,393 ft), from where an aerial cableway continues to Chäserrugg (2,262 m, 7,421 ft), a peak of the Churfirsten range above Lake Walen. The line has a length of 1,195 m (3,921 ft) with a maximum incline of 27% and a difference of elevation of 428 m (1,404 ft).

The funicular is owned and operated by Toggenburg Bergbahnen AG.

The railway was built in 1934, the aerial lift 1972.

== See also ==
- List of funiculars in Switzerland
