= Brisi =

Mountain in Switzerland

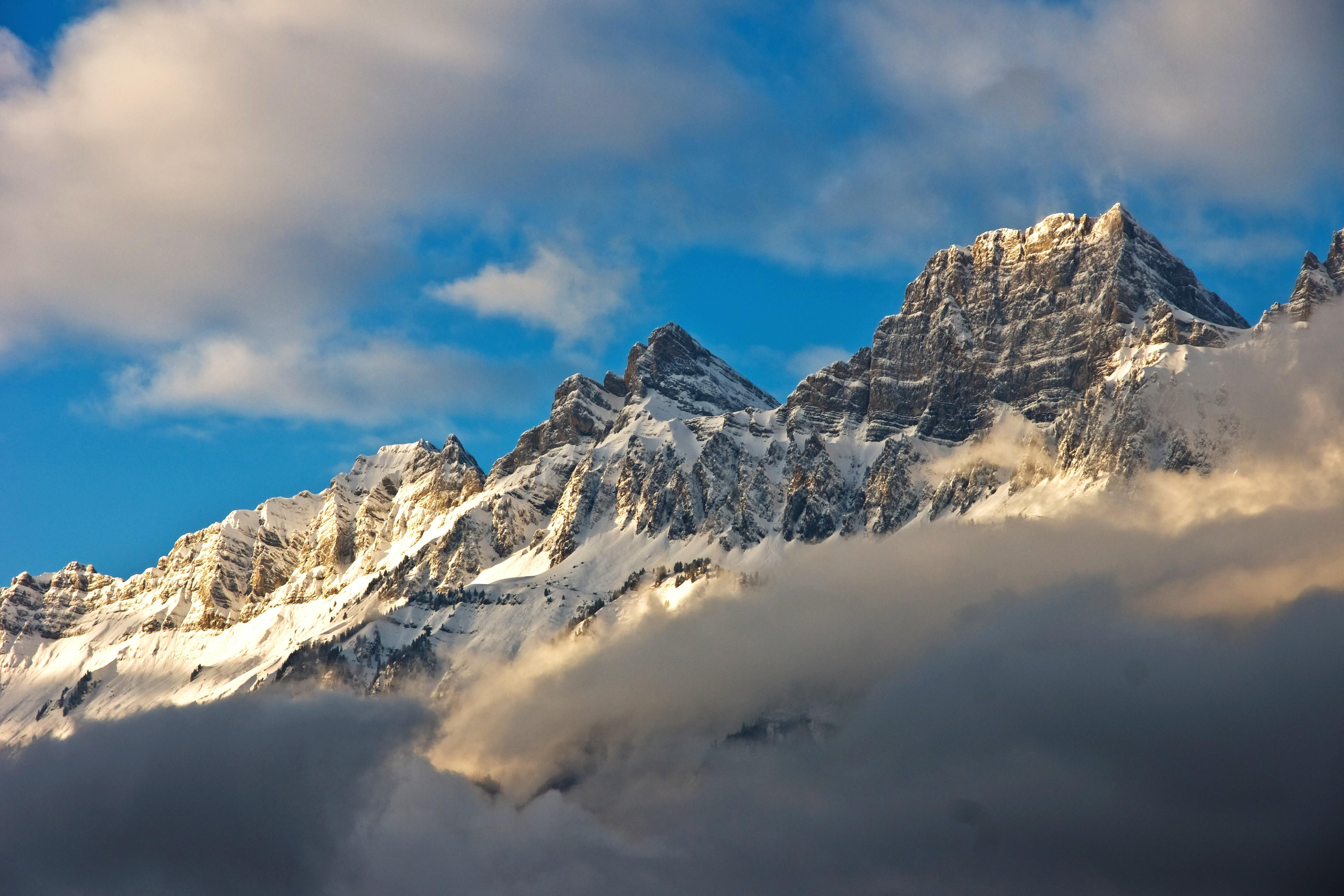
- South view of the Brisi (right)

Highest point
- Elevation: 2,279 m (7,477 ft)
- Prominence: 325 m (1,066 ft)
- Parent peak: Hinterrugg
- Coordinates: 47°9′12″N 9°16′36″E

Geography
- Location within Switzerland Location within Canton of St. Gallen
- Location: St. Gallen
- Country: Switzerland
- Parent range: Appenzell Alps

The Brisi is a mountain of the Churfirsten group, located in the Appenzell Alps. It overlooks Lake Walenstadt in the canton of St. Gallen. The summit is easily accessible by trail via the northern side, from the Toggenburg region.

== See also ==
- List of mountains of the canton of St. Gallen
