= Seeztal =

Valley in Switzerland

Coordinates: 47.08°N 9.37°E

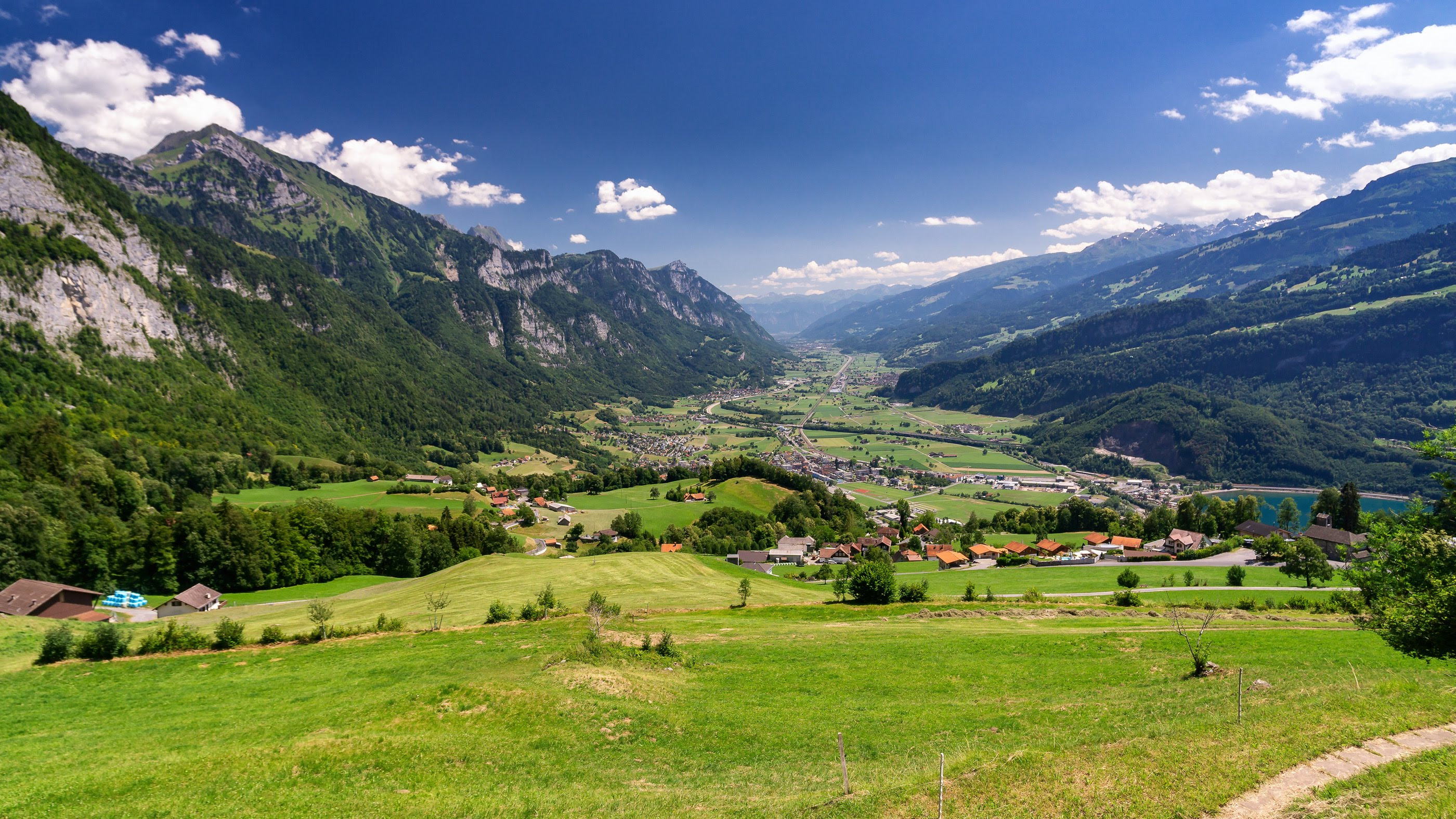
View of the Seeztal towards east

The Seeztal (English: Seez Valley) is a valley in the canton of St. Gallen, Switzerland, extending to the east of Lake Walen (Walensee) for some 10 km (6.2 mi) and followed by the lower portion of the river Seez (its upper portion flows through the Weisstannental).

The Seeztal appears to be a left branch off the Alpine Rhine valley at Sargans, but there is a divide at Mels.

Situated in the Seeztal are the municipalities of Walenstadt (425 m (1,394 ft) a.s.l.), Flums (453 m (1,486 ft) a.s.l.) and Mels (500 m (1,600 ft) a.s.l.).

== Transportation ==
The Seeztal lies along the shortest route between the cities of Chur (the capital of the canton of Grisons) and Zürich (Switzerland's largest city). Running along the valley are the A3 motorway and the Ziegelbrücke–Sargans railway line. As a consequence, the Seeztal is well connected to Greater Zurich, the journey by train from Zurich Airport to Mels taking 98 minutes.

== Seez ==
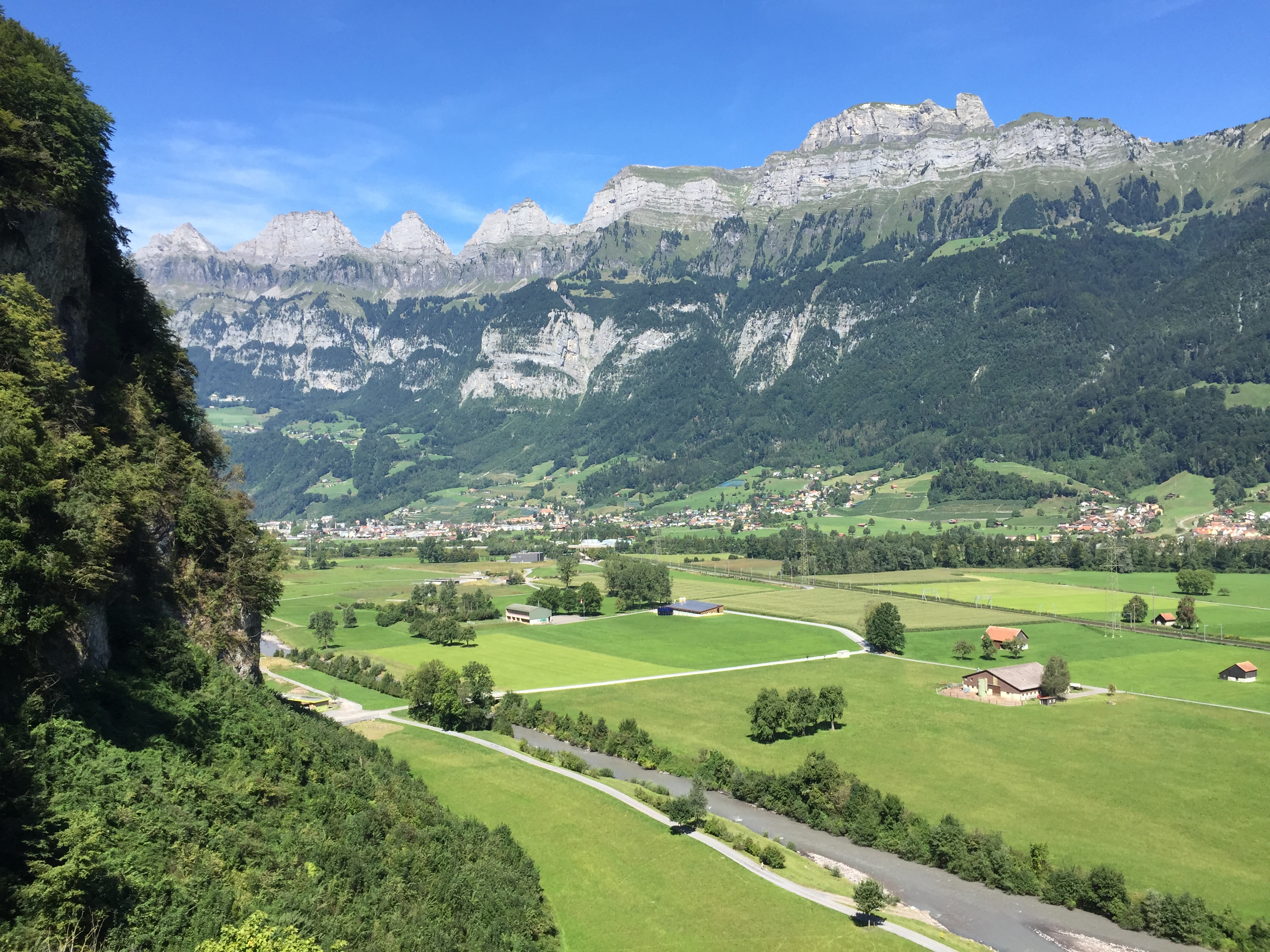
Seez, Seeztal and Churfirsten

The Seez is a tributary of Lake Walen and the river Linth, the lake's outflow since the regulation of the Linth in the early 19th century. The Seez rises from a glacier at Chli Schiben at 2,090 m (6,860 ft) a.s.l. in the Glarus Alps. It first flows in a northeast direction past Weisstannen through the Weisstannen Valley (Weisstannental) until it reaches Mels, where the river takes a sharp turn in northwest direction. Its mouth at Lake Walen is in Walenstadt. The river is mostly canalized in the Seeztal.

== See also ==
- List of valleys of the Alps
- List of rivers of Switzerland
