= Hinterrugg =

Mountain in Switzerland

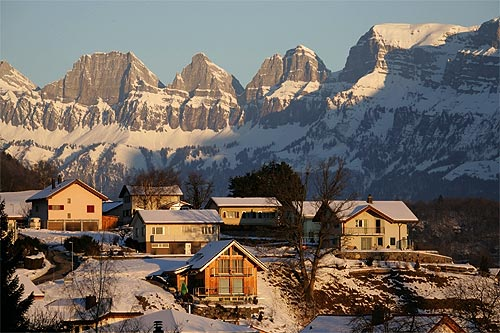
- North view of the Churfirsten with the Hinterrugg on the right

Highest point
- Elevation: 2,306 m (7,566 ft)
- Prominence: 470 m (1,540 ft)
- Parent peak: Gamsberg
- Coordinates: 47°9′13.2″N 9°18′17.4″E

Geography
- Location within Switzerland Location within Canton of St. Gallen
- Location: St. Gallen
- Country: Switzerland
- Parent range: Appenzell Alps

The Hinterrugg (or Hinderrugg) is the highest peak of the Churfirsten group, located in the Appenzell Alps. It overlooks the town of Walenstadt and the lake in the canton of St. Gallen. The summit is easily accessible via the Chäserrugg cable car station (2,262 m [7,421 ft]), above Unterwasser in Toggenburg.

The Hinterrugg is a well-known location for BASE jumping.

== See also ==
- List of mountains of the canton of St. Gallen
