= Toggenburg =

Toggenburg Wahlkreis Toggenburg
- Constituency
- Coordinates: 47°17′58″N 9°5′13″E
- Country: Switzerland
- Canton: St. Gallen

Area
  - Total: 488.75 km^{2} (188.71 sq mi)

Population (December 2020)
  - Total: 46,954
  - Density: 96.070/km^{2} (248.82/sq mi)
- Time zone: UTC+1 (CET)
  - Summer (DST): UTC+2 (CEST)
- Municipalities: 10

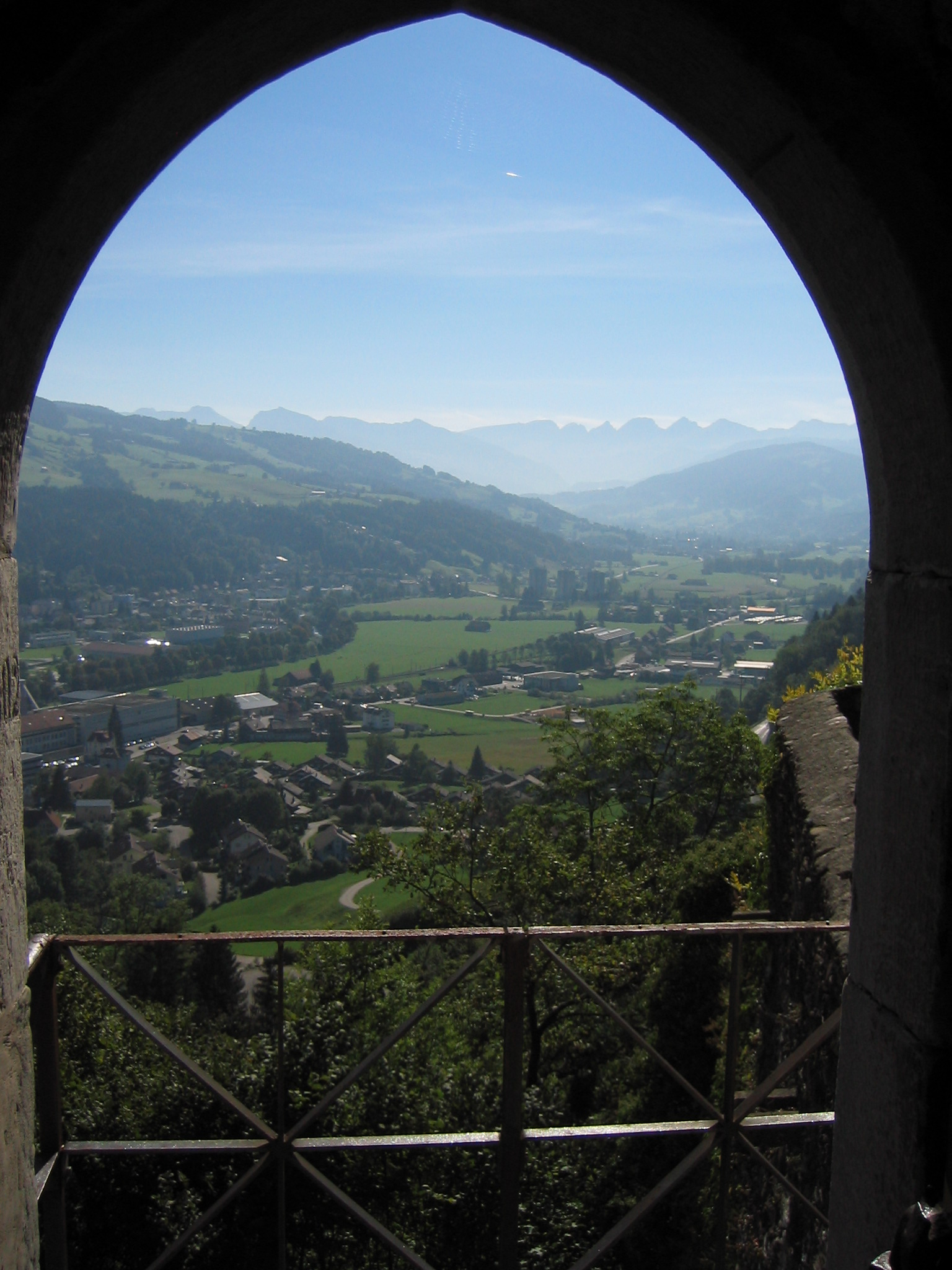
Middle and upper Toggenburg as seen from Iberg Castle, Wattwil

Toggenburg (Swiss Standard German pronunciation: [ˈtɔɡn̩ˌbʊrɡ]) is a region of Switzerland. It corresponds to the upper valley of the River Thur and that of the Necker, one of its affluents. Since 1 January 2003, Toggenburg has been a constituency (Wahlkreis) of the canton of St. Gallen (SFOS number 1727).

== Geography and tourism ==
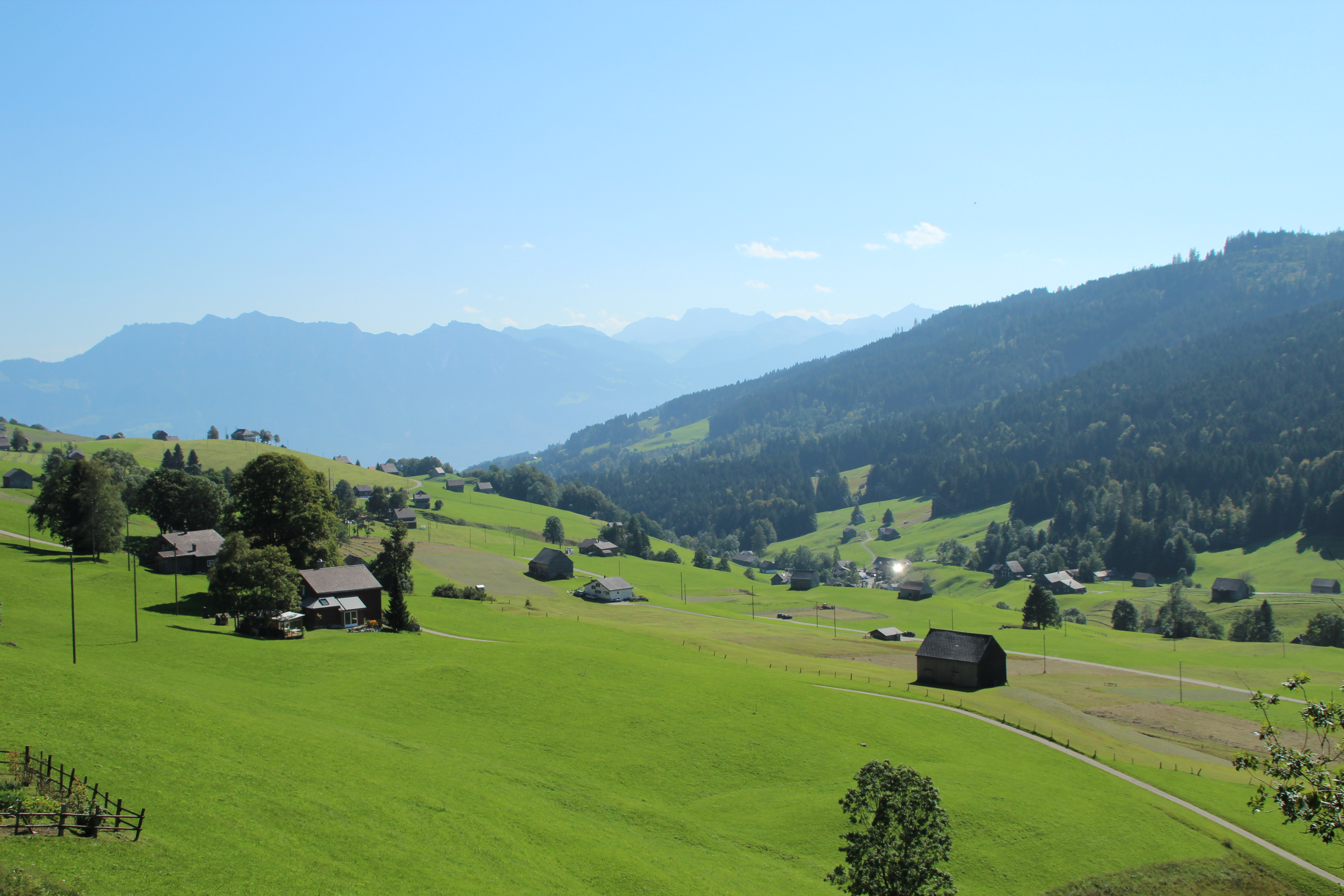
Streusiedlung at the eastern end of the Toggenburg

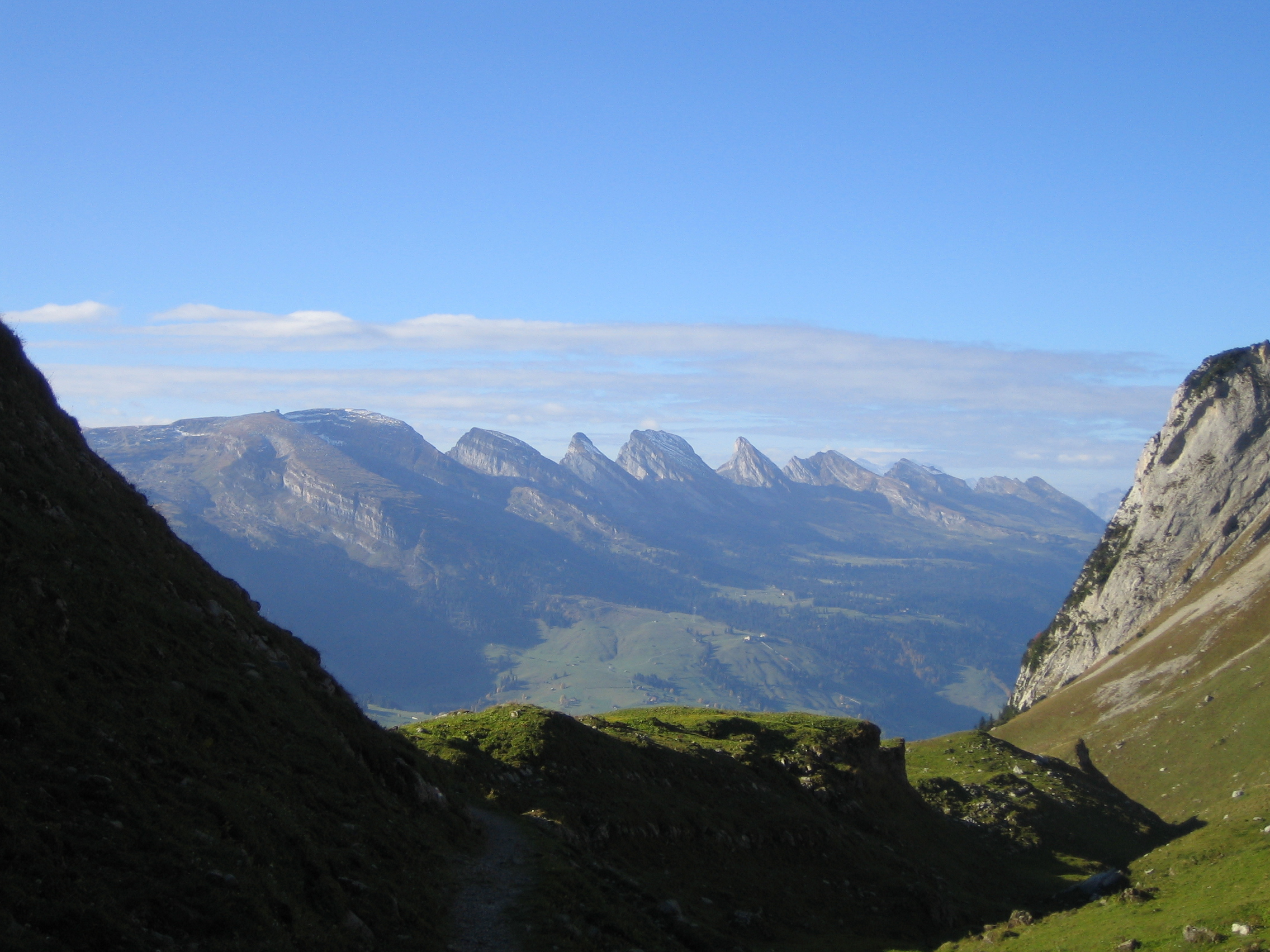
The Churfirsten (view from Alpstein with Toggenburg below)

Located in the Appenzell Alps, the valley descends in a northwestern direction from the watershed between the Rhine and the Thur. The upper valley is enclosed on the northeast by the chain of the Säntis (2,501.9 m [8,208 ft], Alpstein massif) and on the southwest by that of the Churfirsten ("seven peaks", the highest peak is the Hinterrugg at 2,306 m [7,566 ft]) and the Speer (1,951 m [6,401 ft]). To the west, the valley is delimited by a mountain range that includes the Tanzboden (1,443 m [4,734 ft]) and Tweralpspitz (1,332 m [4,370 ft]), separated by the Ricken Pass to the See-Gaster district of St. Gallen. Toggenburg is a fertile valley of about 45 kilometres (28 mi) in length from the source of the river to Wil (Fürstenland district).

There are several ski resorts in the upper part of the valley, such as in Wildhaus, Unterwasser and Alt St. Johann. There are also many hiking paths with scenic views. Main sights include the Thur waterfalls, Schwendisee, canopy walkway in Mogelsberg, historic buildings, caves and several mountain peaks, some of which are accessible by cable car (e.g. the Chäserrugg at 2,262 m [7,421 ft]).

At Wildhaus, the highest village in the valley (3,632 ft [1,107 m]), the house wherein Huldrych Zwingli, the Swiss Reformer, was born in 1484, is still shown. Other villages are Lichtensteig, Kirchberg and Wattwil.

== History ==
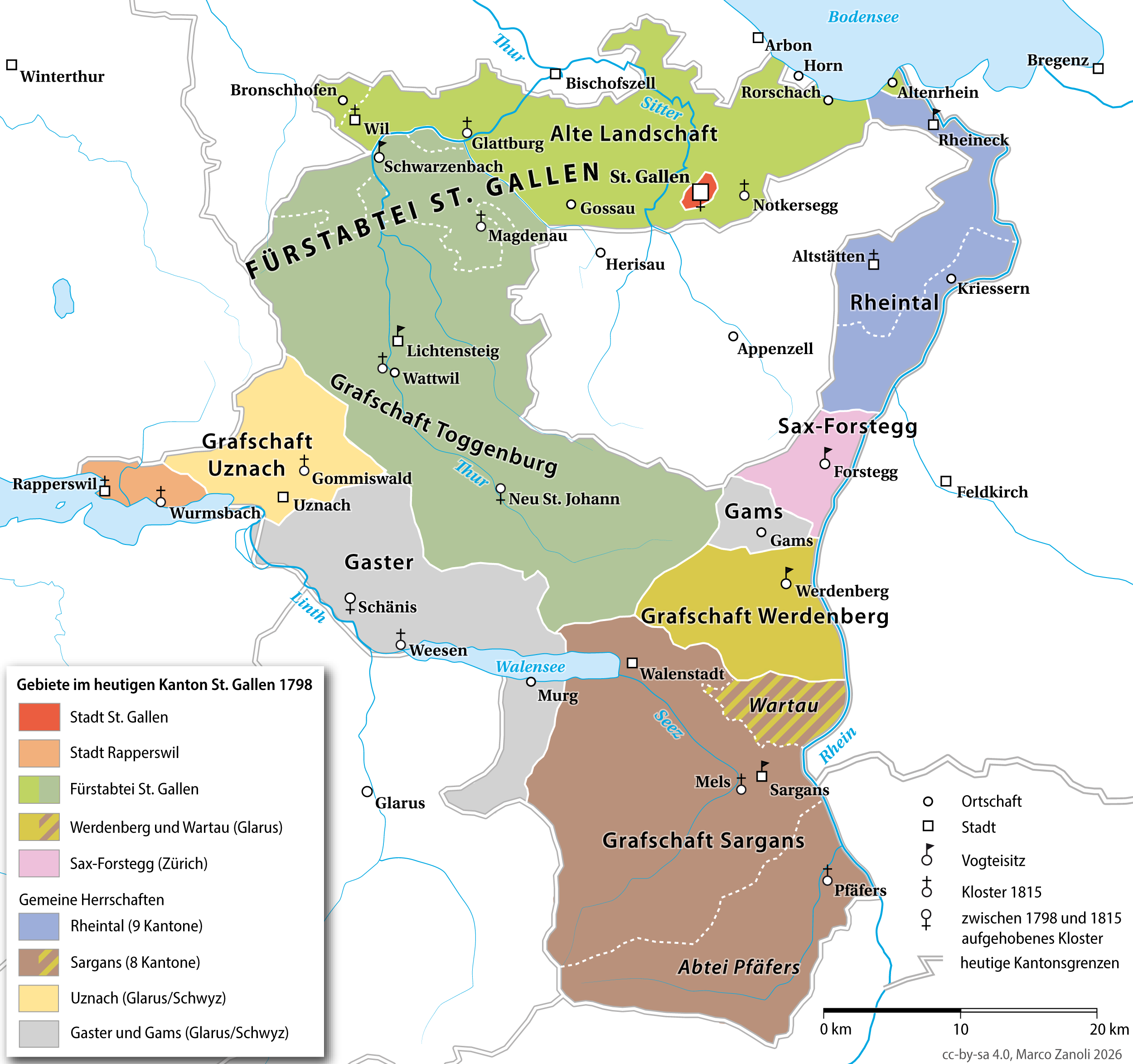
Map of the historical territories of the Canton of St. Gallen. The former county of Toggenburg is shown in pink.

There are traces of the Paleolithic Mousterian Industry throughout the Appenzell Alps, in the Toggenburg notably in Wildenmannlisloch cave.

The upper Thur valley was part of the province of Raetia in the Roman era, and was reached by Alemannic-speaking settlers only in the early medieval period. This is evidenced by a substantial substrate of Romance toponyms in the upper Toggenburg (upstream of Stein).

The name of the region is derived from that of the House of Toggenburg (named for their castle near Kirchberg) who ruled over parts of the Toggenburg region since the 12th century, in the 13th century taking the title of counts (comes) and extending their domain to include all of the upper Thur valley. The extinction of the main line of the counts of Toggenburg (1436) led to the Old Zurich War (1440–46) ultimately resulting in the temporary expulsion of Zürich from the Swiss confederacy. Eventually, the Toggenburg passed to the lord of Raron (in Valais), who sold it to the abbot of St. Gall in 1468.

Part of the Toggenburg followed the Swiss Reformation led by Zwingli, and the valley declared itself independent in 1530, but was forced to re-submit to the Abbot of St. Gall in 1538. The Abbot was, however, pressured into toleration of either confession, so that the Toggenburg became one of the few regions of Switzerland, where Catholicism and Protestantism have a tradition of co-existence.

In 1707, the Toggenburg again declared its independence of St. Gall, in reaction to the Abbey's plans to build a road across the Ricken Pass, which was seen as a strategic arrangement towards a Catholic military alliance. The ensuing Toggenburg War of 1712 resulted in a balance of power between Catholic and Protestant cantons, ultimately leading to the formation of Switzerland as a federal state.

In the Helvetic Republic, the Toggenburg was divided between the cantons of Säntis and Linth. The parts were re-united as part of the canton of St. Gallen in 1803.

Schüblig, a type of sausage, is a tradition in the area.

== Demographics ==
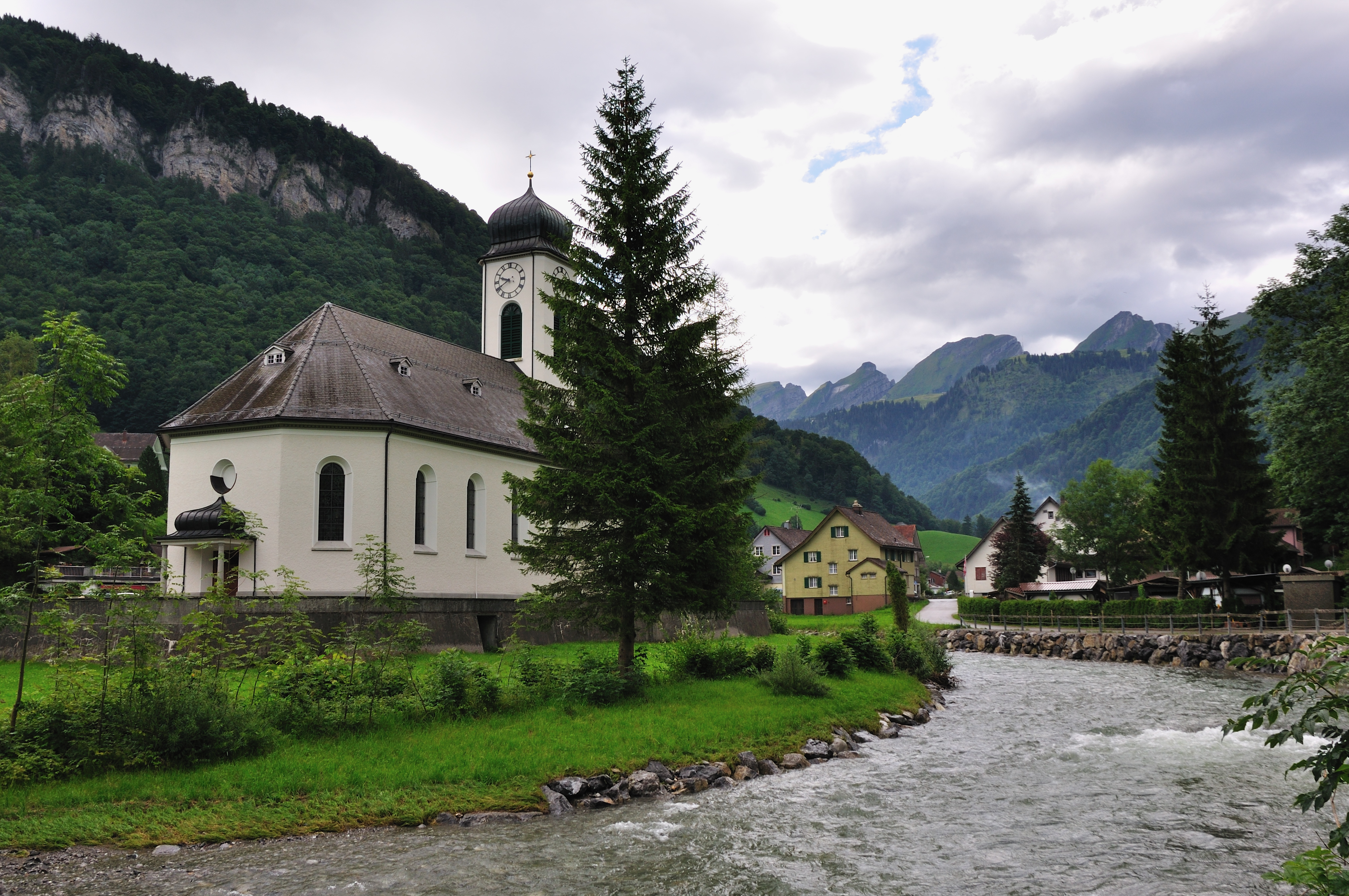
View of the Thur and the church of Stein, facing north, with the Churfirsten visible in the backdrop.

The Toggenburg Wahlkreis has a population of 46,954 (as of 31 December 2020). Of the foreign population, (as of 2000), 584 are from Germany, 952 are from Italy, 3,124 are from ex-Yugoslavia, 167 are from Austria, 1,137 are from Turkey, and 1,123 are from another country. Of the Swiss national languages (as of 2000), 41,718 speak German, 107 people speak French, 673 people speak Italian, and 47 people speak Romansh.

The age distribution, as of 2000, is; 6,296 children or 13.7% of the population are between 0 and 9 years old and 7,444 teenagers or 16.2% are between 10 and 19. Of the adult population, 5,046 people or 11.0% of the population are between 20 and 29 years old. 6,784 people or 14.8% are between 30 and 39, 6,390 people or 13.9% are between 40 and 49, and 4,926 people or 10.7% are between 50 and 59. The senior population distribution is 3,773 people or 8.2% of the population are between 60 and 69 years old, 3,269 people or 7.1% are between 70 and 79, there are 1,652 people or 3.6% who are between 80 and 89, and there are 326 people or 0.7% who are between 90 and 99, and 1 person who is 100 or more.

In 2000 there were 4,967 persons (or 10.8% of the population) who were living alone in a private dwelling. There were 8,910 (or 19.4%) persons who were part of a couple (married or otherwise committed) without children, and 27,097 (or 59.0%) who were part of a couple with children. There were 2,202 (or 4.8%) people who lived in single parent home, while there are 318 persons who were adult children living with one or both parents, 165 persons who lived in a household made up of relatives, 198 people who lived in a household made up of unrelated persons, and 2,050 who are either institutionalized or lived in another type of collective housing.

Out of the total population in the region, as of 2000, the highest education level completed by 11,393 people (24.8% of the population) was Primary, while 15,123 (32.9%) have completed Secondary, 3,627 (7.9%) have attended a Tertiary school, and 2,291 (5.0%) are not in school. The remainder did not answer this question.

As of October 2009 the average unemployment rate was 2.9%.

From the 2000 census, 21,238 or 46.3% are Roman Catholic, while 15,930 or 34.7% belonged to the Swiss Reformed Church. Of the rest of the population, there are 29 individuals (or about 0.06% of the population) who belong to the Christian Catholic denomination, there are 939 individuals (or about 2.05% of the population) who belong to the Orthodox Church, and there are 1,033 individuals (or about 2.25% of the population) who belong to another denomination. There are 11 individuals (or about 0.02% of the population) who are Jewish, and 2,889 (or about 6.29% of the population) who are Muslim. There are 245 individuals (or about 0.53% of the population) who belong to another church (not listed on the census), 2,183 (or about 4.76% of the population) belong to no church, are agnostic or atheist, and 1,410 individuals (or about 3.07% of the population) did not answer the question.

== Municipalities ==
Since 1 January 2013, the Toggenburg district has consisted of ten municipalities:

Coat of arms	Municipality	Population (31 December 2020)	Area in km^{2}	Elevation in m	SFOS number
Bütschwil-Ganterschwil	Bütschwil-Ganterschwil	5,041	21.83	610	3395
Ebnat-Kappel	Ebnat-Kappel	5,007	43.57	630	3352
Kirchberg	Kirchberg	9,241	42.59	735	3392
Lichtensteig	Lichtensteig	1,879	2.82	625	3374
Lütisburg	Lütisburg	1,614	14.09	580	3393
Mosnang	Mosnang	2,889	50.46	735	3394
Neckertal	Neckertal	4,064	49.03	660	3378
Nesslau	Nesslau	3,608	92.7	759	3360
Wattwil	Wattwil	8,837	51.18	610	3379
Wildhaus-Alt St.Johann	Wildhaus-Alt St. Johann	2,624	87.53	895	3357
	Toggenburg	46,954	488.75		1727

== Mergers and name changes ==
- On 1 January 2013 the former municipalities of Bütschwil and Ganterschwil merged to form Bütschwil-Ganterschwil, the former municipality of Krinau merged into the municipality of Wattwil and the former municipalities of Nesslau-Krummenau and Stein merged into the new municipality of Nesslau.
- On 1 January 2023 the former municipalities of Hemberg and Oberhelfenschwil merged to form the new municipality of Neckertal.

== Transportation ==
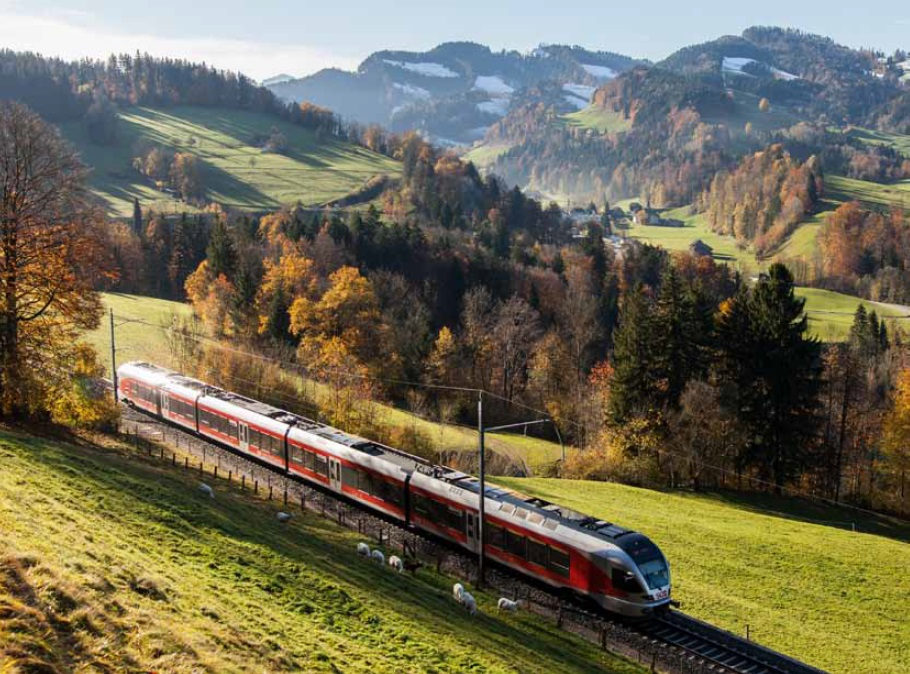
S4 service between Mogelsberg and Brunnadern-Neckertal

The Toggenburg is traversed by the southern section of the Bodensee–Toggenburg railway line between Mogelsberg and Nesslau-Neu St. Johann, while the Wil–Ebnat-Kappel railway line runs through the lower part of the valley between Lütisburg and Ebnat-Kappel. In addition, the Uznach–Wattwil railway line links Wattwil with the Linth Plain via the Ricken Tunnel. Wattwil station is the major hub for train and bus services in the Toggenburg.

The lines are operated by regional trains of St. Gallen S-Bahn. The S2 and S4 operate on the Bodensee–Toggenburg railway, with the latter diverting from it at Wattwil and continuing to Uznach/Rapperswil. The S9 links Wattwil with the lower part of the valley and Wil (connection with long-distance trains to Zürich HB, Bern and Geneva).

Additionally, the InterRegio Voralpen-Express provides long-distance services, from Wattwil to St. Gallen and to Arth-Goldau and Luzern, bypassing Zürich.

The BLWE provides bus services between Lichtensteig, Wattwil and Ebnat-Kappel. PostBus Switzerland (PostAuto) provides bus services in the upper part of the valley (e.g. to Unterwasser or Wildhaus) between Wattwil and Buchs SG. From Unterwasser, the Iltiosbahn, a funicular, takes passengers to Iltios, from where an aerial tram continues to Chäserrugg (Churfirsten). Nesslau-Neu St. Johann railway station is linked by a PostAuto bus route with Schwägalp Pass, where the valley station of an aerial tram to Säntis is located.

== See also ==
- Municipalities of the canton of St. Gallen
- Swiss Prealps
