= Farner =

Farner may refer to:

- Farner (automobile), an American automobile manufactured by OM Farner between 1922 and 1923
- Farner, Tennessee, a community in the United States
- Farner HF Colibri 1 SL, a Swiss motor glider

== People with the surname ==
- Caroline Farner (1842–1913), Swiss doctor and activist
- Donald S. Farner (1915–1988), American ornithologist
- Mark Farner (born 1948), American singer, guitarist and songwriter
