= Kefikon =

Village and castle in Thurgau and Zurich

- Former municipality
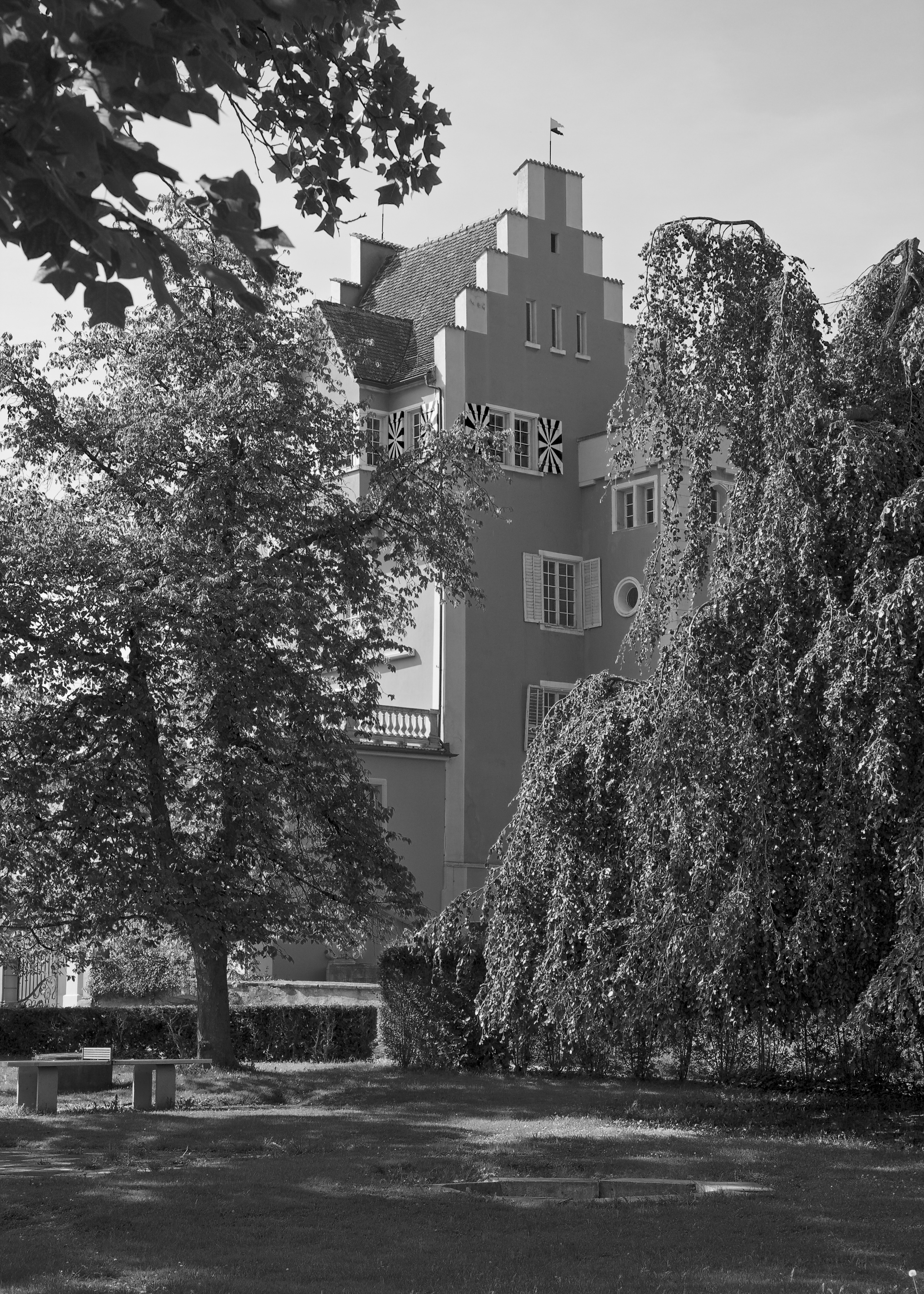
- Kefikon Castle from the south-east

- Coat of arms
- Location of Kefikon
- Location within Switzerland Location within Canton of Thurgau
- Coordinates: 47.548938888889°N 8.8321888888889°E
- Country: Switzerland
- Canton: Thurgau
- District: {{{district}}}
- Municipality: Gachnang

Population (2000)
  - Total: 449
- Time zone: UTC+01:00 (CET)
  - Summer (DST): UTC+02:00 (CEST)
- SFOS number: 4574
- ISO 3166 code: CH-TG
- Website

Kefikon is a village and castle (Kefikon Castle, German: Schloss Kefikon) on the border between the cantons of Thurgau and Zurich, Switzerland. The larger part of Kefikon belonged until 1997, as an Ortsgemeinde (local commune), to the Thurgau Munizipalgemeinde (municipal commune) of Gachnang, and it has been part of the political municipality of Gachnang since 1998. The smaller part belongs to the Zurich municipality of Wiesendangen.

== History ==
Kefikon was owned by Reichenau Abbey and formed a lordship with its own court (Gerichtsherrschaft), which from the end of the 15th century it shared with Islikon and which was exercised by the lords residing in Kefikon Castle. The lordship was first held by the lords of Kefikon, of whom Burchardus de Kevincon is the first on record, in 1241. They were followed by the lords of Gachnang, recorded from 1346, by the lords of Boswil from 1391 to 1453 and by the Ryff family, also called Welter von Blidegg, from 1453 to 1529. The lordship was then held by the squire (Junker) Hans von Grüt from 1529 to 1566, by the Joner family of Frauenfeld, known as Rüpplin, from 1566 to 1650, by the Hirzel family of Zurich from 1650 to 1740 and from 1740 by the Escher vom Glas. From 1427 the border between the counties of Kyburg and Thurgau ran through the middle of the lordship and of the castle, which has been part of Thurgau since 1970. The first Offnung (record of customary law) dates from 1493.

Kefikon always belonged to the parish of Gachnang and was purely Reformed until the end of the 18th century. In 1766 Bernhard Greuter set up a textile dye works in Kefikon, which was expanded after he moved to Islikon and existed until the middle of the 19th century. Some houses in the village and the factory pond, now used as a swimming pool, recall it. New residential neighborhoods have been built in the farming village since the middle of the 20th century.

The Thurgau part of Kefikon had 40 inhabitants in 1640, 164 in 1850, 138 in 1900, 248 in 1950 and 449 in 2000; the Zurich part had 19 inhabitants in 1640 and 93 in 2000.

== Castle ==
Of the original moated castle (Weiherburg), the residential tower (Wohnturm) survives; the moat was filled in during the 15th century. Residential wings were added in the 17th and 18th centuries, and after a fire in 1929 the castle took on its present appearance. In 1906 August Bach set up a Landerziehungsheim (country boarding school) in the castle, which is now run as a private school.

== Bibliography ==
- E. Stauber, Schloss und Herrschaft Kefikon, 1943
- Albert Knoepfli, Der Bezirk Frauenfeld, 1950, pp. 302–309 (Die Kunstdenkmäler des Kantons Thurgau, 1)
