= Islikon =

Village in Thurgau, Switzerland

- Former municipality
- Islikon from the air in 1954
- Location of Islikon
- Location within Switzerland Location within Canton of Thurgau
- Coordinates: 47.5469°N 8.8429°E
- Country: Switzerland
- Canton: Thurgau
- District: Frauenfeld
- Municipality: Gachnang

Population (1990)
  - Total: 901
- Time zone: UTC+01:00 (CET)
  - Summer (DST): UTC+02:00 (CEST)
- SFOS number: 4573
- ISO 3166 code: CH-TG
- Website

Islikon is a former Ortsgemeinde (local commune) in the canton of Thurgau, Switzerland, now part of the municipality of Gachnang in the district of Frauenfeld. From 1803 to 1997 it belonged to the Munizipalgemeinde (municipal commune) of Gachnang. The industrial village lies on the Tegelbach, on the road from Frauenfeld to Winterthur.

== History ==
Islikon is first mentioned in 1267 as Islincon. Even before 1267 it was part of the landholdings of Reichenau Abbey. At the end of the 13th century individual properties passed from the abbey's ministerial family of Gerlikon to Töss Monastery, and later also to Paradies Monastery. From the end of the 15th century Islikon was subject to the lordship (Gerichtsherrschaft) of Kefikon. An Offnung (record of customary law) of 1493 survives. Islikon always belonged to the parish of Gachnang and was a purely Reformed village until the end of the 18th century.

From 1777 the new main road from Winterthur via Frauenfeld to Constance and the calico printing works of Bernhard Greuter, which grew into a regional textile center at the beginning of the 19th century, brought economic growth. Around 1830, 300 workers were employed in the village-like factory complex in Islikon alone. At the end of the 19th century new industrial businesses settled in Islikon because of its good transport links (railway connection in 1855). Since the middle of the 20th century Islikon has been growing again through the building of residential neighborhoods and the arrival of businesses such as Jossi AG, founded in 1957 and specializing in precision mechanics. Since 1981 the former Greuterhof has belonged to the Bernhard Greuter Foundation for vocational information (Stiftung Bernhard Greuter für Berufsinformation).

Islikon had 92 inhabitants in 1710, 279 in 1850, 325 in 1900, 474 in 1950 and 901 in 1990.

== Bibliography ==
- P. Giger et al., Islikon, 1991
- Albert Knoepfli, Der Bezirk Frauenfeld, 1950, pp. 220–222 (Die Kunstdenkmäler des Kantons Thurgau, 1)
