= Bernhard Greuter =

Swiss textile manufacturer (1745–1822)

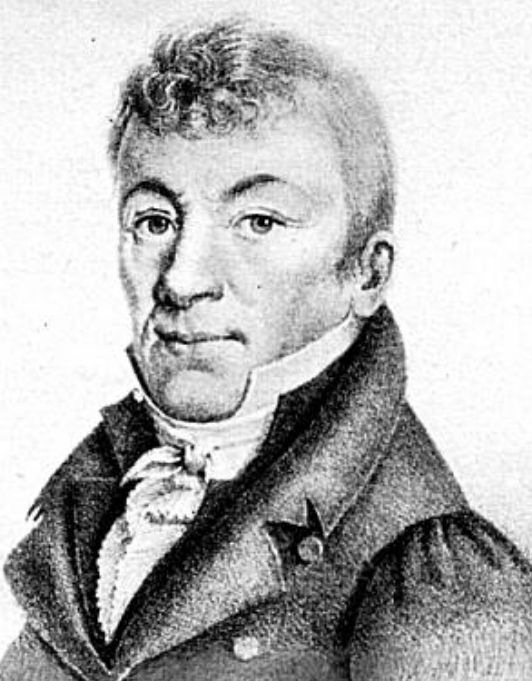
- Born: 20 February 1745; Ulisbach
- Died: 11 September 1822 (aged 77); Islikon, Thurgau, Switzerland
- Occupations: Textile manufacturer; politician
- Spouse: Maria Magdalena Wettstein (m. 1773)
- Parents: Konrad Greuter (father); Anna Elisabeth Billeter (mother)

Bernhard Greuter (20 February 1745 – 11 September 1822) was a Swiss textile manufacturer and politician. In 1777 he built one of the first factories in Switzerland in Islikon, which grew into a village-like complex, and in 1796 he founded with the Rieter brothers of Winterthur the trading company that became Greuter & Rieter, one of the most important Swiss textile companies of the 19th century. In 1802 he set up the first private social insurance scheme in Switzerland.

== Biography ==
Bernhard Greuter was born on 20 February 1745 in Ulisbach, the son of Konrad Greuter, a mercenary (Reisläufer) and trader, and Anna Elisabeth Billeter. In 1773 he married Maria Magdalena Wettstein, daughter of the innkeeper Heinrich Wettstein.

The Greuterhof in Islikon

After training as a private tutor, Greuter learned his trade in the calico printing works (Indiennedruckerei) of Johann Heinrich Streiff of Glarus, and then with Johannes Schiess & Daniel Merz in Herisau. Around 1765 he settled in Kefikon and opened a textile dyeing and printing works. After moving in 1773 to his father-in-law's inn in Islikon, he gradually expanded his textile business. In 1777 he built one of the first factories in Switzerland at the Stern tavern (Taverne zum Stern) in Islikon; by the early 19th century it had grown into a village-like complex. Greuter drew water power from artificial ponds.

In 1796, together with the brothers Bernhard and Hans Jacob Rieter of Winterthur, Greuter founded a trading company which, as Greuter & Rieter, became one of the most important textile companies in Switzerland in the 19th century. In 1802 he set up the first private social insurance scheme in Switzerland (health insurance fund, military insurance, old-age savings fund and others) for the society of printers and block cutters (Drucker- und Modelstechergesellschaft). In 1805 he opened a branch of his business in Frauenfeld, and in 1806 the branch Ziegler-Greuter & Cie. was founded in Guebwiller in Alsace. Around 1830 the Greuter factory in Islikon had about 300 employees. The company ran into difficulties in the 1870s and was closed down in 1880.

In 1798 Greuter sat on the Landeskomitee, the committee charged with obtaining the independence of Thurgau. From 1798 to 1800 he was a member of the Grand Council (Grosser Rat) of the Helvetic Republic, and from 1803 to 1822 a member of the cantonal parliament of Thurgau (Kantonsrat). He died in Islikon on 11 September 1822.

Since 1981 the Greuterhof building complex in Islikon has belonged to the Bernhard Greuter Foundation for vocational information (Stiftung Bernhard Greuter für Berufsinformation), later the Greuterhof Islikon Foundation (Stiftung Greuterhof Islikon).

== Bibliography ==
- Jürg Ganz, "Die Greuter'sche Fabrik in Islikon", in Archithese. Zeitschrift und Schriftenreihe für Architektur und Kunst, 1980/5
- Hans Amann, "Bernhard Greuter (1745–1822), eine Gründerpersönlichkeit der schweizerischen Volkswirtschaft. Ein Lebensbild", in Toggenburger Annalen, 20, 1993, pp. 69–75
- Ernest Menolfi, "Early Textile Printing in Eastern Switzerland and its Forgotten B(l)oom around 1800", in Kim Siebenhüner, John Jordan and Gabi Schopf (eds.), Cotton in Context. Manufacturing, Marketing, and Consuming Textiles in the German-speaking World (1500–1900), 2019, pp. 119–144
