= Hans Jacob Rieter =

Swiss merchant (1766–1811)

- Born: 1766; Winterthur, Old Swiss Confederacy
- Died: 5 May 1811 (aged 44–45); Heidelberg, Grand Duchy of Baden
- Occupation: Merchant
- Spouse: Anna Katharina Graf

Hans Jacob Rieter (1766 – 5 May 1811) was a Swiss merchant from Winterthur. In 1796 he, his brother Bernhard and Bernhard Greuter founded the trading company Greuter & Rieter, which he ran alone from 1805 and which became the most important company in its sector in Switzerland. He died after an attack by highway robbers on his way to the Frankfurt fair.

== Biography ==
Hans Jacob Rieter was born in 1766 in Winterthur. He married Anna Katharina Graf, a niece of Anton Graff.

Rieter was a merchant and traded in printed textiles together with his brother Bernhard. In 1796 the two brothers and Bernhard Greuter founded the trading company Greuter & Rieter, which Rieter ran alone from 1805. With the printing works in Islikon, which had more than 400 workers, and the red dyeworks (Rotfärberei) in Frauenfeld, the company became the most important in its sector in Switzerland.

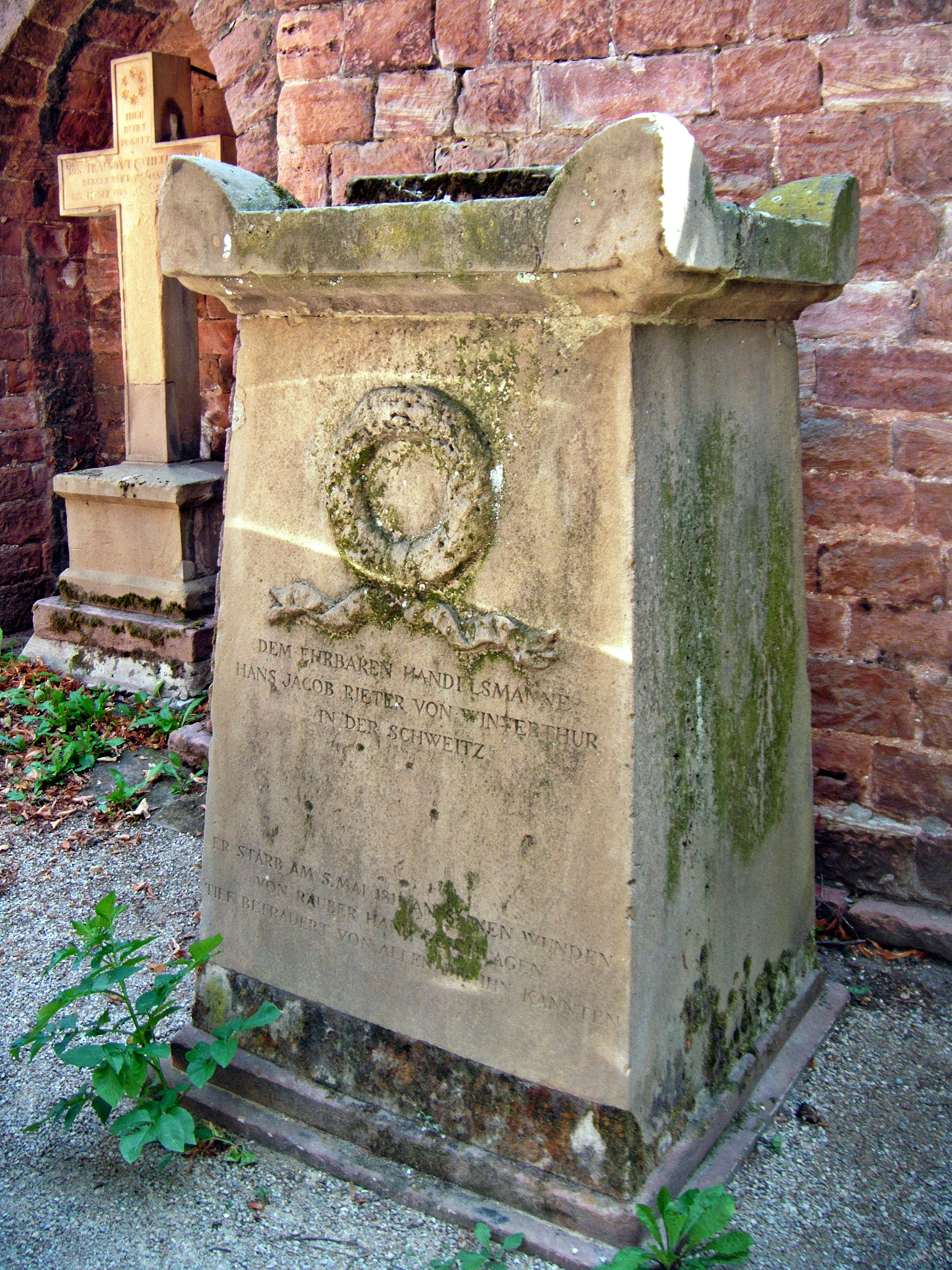
Rieter's gravestone in Heidelberg

On his way to the Frankfurt fair in 1811, Rieter was attacked by highway robbers. He died in Heidelberg on 5 May 1811.

== Bibliography ==
- E. Schöll, "Hans Jacob Rieter (1766–1811)", in Winterthurer Jahrbuch, 18, 1971, 191–198
