= Aadorf =

Municipality in northern Switzerland

- Municipality
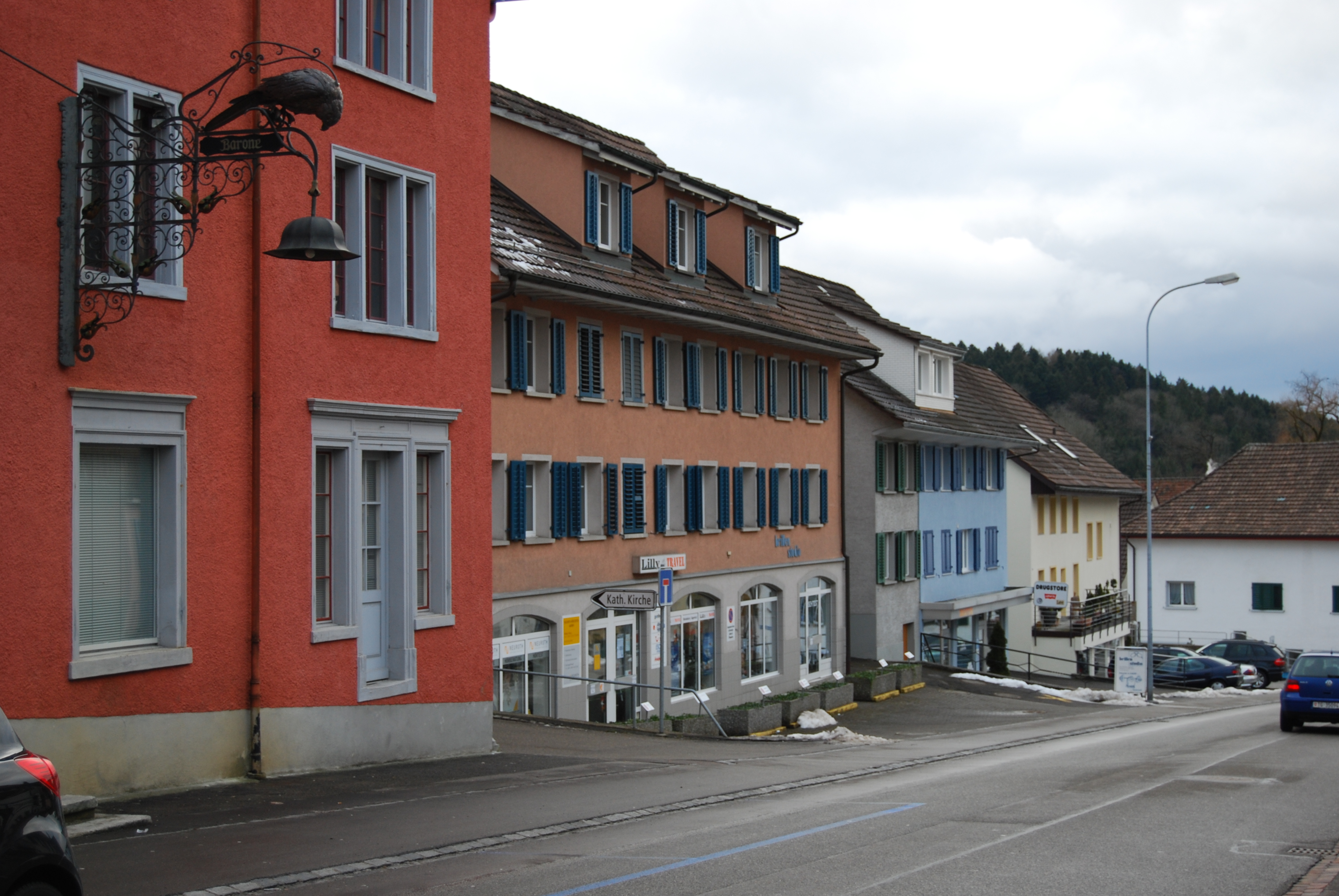
- Aadorf village main street

- Flag Coat of arms
- Location of Aadorf
- Location within Switzerland Location within Canton of Thurgau
- Coordinates: 47°30′N 8°54′E
- Country: Switzerland
- Canton: Thurgau
- District: Münchwilen

Area
  - Total: 19.93 km^{2} (7.70 sq mi)
- Elevation: 517 m (1,696 ft)

Population (December 2008)
  - Total: 4,351
  - Density: 218.3/km^{2} (565.4/sq mi)
- Time zone: UTC+01:00 (CET)
  - Summer (DST): UTC+02:00 (CEST)
- Postal code: 8355
- SFOS number: 4551
- ISO 3166 code: CH-TG
- Localities: Aadorf, Aawangen, Bürg, Ettenhausen, Friedtal, Guntershausen bei Aadorf, Häuslenen, Huzenwil, Maischhausen, Moos, Tänikon, Weiern, Wittenwil, Wittershausen
- Surrounded by: Bichelsee-Balterswil, Frauenfeld, Hofstetten bei Elgg (ZH), Elgg (ZH), Hagenbuch (ZH), Matzingen, Turbenthal (ZH), Wängi
- Website: www.aadorf.ch

Aadorf is a municipality in the district of Münchwilen in the canton of Thurgau in Switzerland. In 1996 Ettenhausen, Guntershausen bei Aadorf, and Wittenwil merged into Aadorf.

== History ==
Aadorf is first mentioned in 886 as Ahadorf. The oldest record of Tänikon, now part of Ettenhausen, dates to 789 as Tanninchova. Tänikon is also the site of the Tänikon monastery, founded in the 13th century. Aawangen is first mentioned in 844 as Oninwanc. Ettenhausen is first mentioned in 1278 as Oetenhuse. Guntershausen bei Aadorf is first mentioned in 1282 as Gundolthuser tal. On 6 April 1358 the brothers Herman and Beringer von Landenberg and Hermann von Landenberg donated the church of Aadorf to the Rüti Monastery.

The territory of the municipality was enlarged in 1996, when it absorbed the neighboring municipalities of Aawangen, Ettenhausen, Guntershausen bei Aadorf, and Wittenwil. As of 2008, it was the canton's seventh largest municipality.

Graves from the Hallstatt period were discovered near Elgg and west of Bruggwingert. The Bachwiesen archeological site has yielded scattered finds from the Bronze and Roman eras. The Church (current building from 1863 to 1865) was founded in 840 by the Emperor, and in 886 it was mentioned as the principal church of the Counts of Linzgau. The nearby older cemetery at Sonnhalde dates from the 7th and 8th centuries. In 890, Count Udalrich IV established a clerical community that was affiliated with the church, for the care of his burial place. But by 894/895 this community had already transferred to the Abbey of St. Gall. The right to appoint the priest, was acquired by the Lords of Bernegg before 1304. In 1318, these rights transferred to Hermann of Hohenlandenberg-Greifensee, in 1349-50 they went to Rüti monastery and after the monastery's secularization in 1525 the rights went to Zurich.

Aerial view from 500 m by Walter Mittelholzer (1929)

After 1427, the dividing line between the territorial boundary of the counties of Kyburg and Thurgau (now the border between Canton Zurich, Thurgau) ran through the parish of Aadorf. During the Late Middle Ages the dominant landlord in Aadorf was the Abbey of St. Gallen. In 1413 the Abbey had to sell all their rights, except for the low justice rights in Tänikon Monastery, to other landholders. In 1528-29, the Protestant Reformation was introduced in Aadorf. As part of the Counter-Reformation Tänikon Monastery expanded. During the wave of secularization that followed the Helvetic Republic, much of the monastery's land was nationalized. After 1804, they were virtually forbidden to accept any new novitiates. The Thurgau Cantonal Constitution of 1831 placed all the monastery's assets under state control. In 1836, the canton appointed a trustee and sold the monastery lands. In 1848 the Grand Council of Thurgau dissolved the monastery and took over the buildings. Two years later, 1850, they sold the monastery and chapel to the Planta family and the Tänikon parish church. The monastery was sold in 1936 to Otto Zuber and in 1969 it was taken over by the new Eidgenosenschaft Forschungsanstalt für Betriebswirtschaft und Landtechnik (Swiss Federal Institute of Business and Agriculture). In 2006 it became the Agrotechnorama Tänikon.

== Geography ==
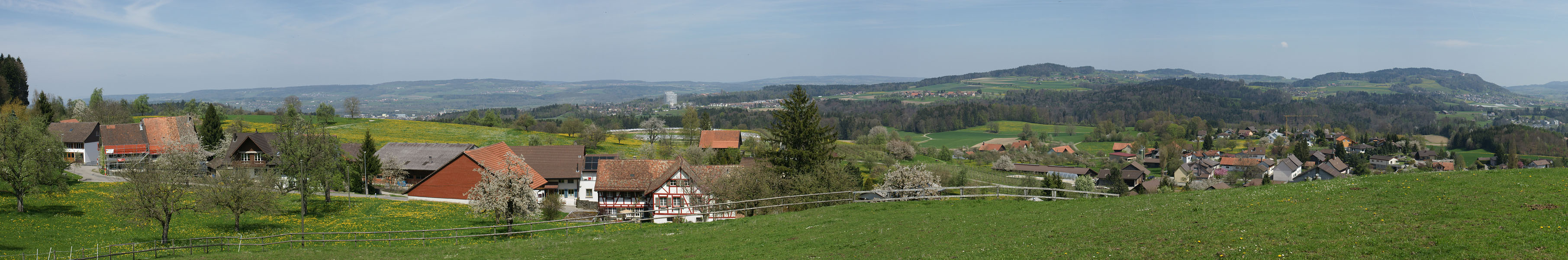
Countryside near Aadorf

Aadorf has an area, as of 2017, of 19.94 square kilometers (7.70 sq mi). Of this area, 10.36 km^{2} (4.00 sq mi) or 52.0% is used for agricultural purposes, while 5.60 km^{2} (2.16 sq mi) or 28.1% is forested. Of the rest of the land, 3.82 km^{2} (1.47 sq mi) or 19.2% is settled (buildings or roads), 0.07 km^{2} (17 acres) or 0.4% is either rivers or lakes and 0.08 km^{2} (20 acres) or 0.4% is unproductive land.

Of the built up area, industrial buildings made up 12.6% of the total area while housing and buildings made up 1.1% and transportation infrastructure made up 4.7%. while parks, green belts and sports fields made up 0.7%. Out of the forested land, 27.1% of the total land area is heavily forested and 1.0% is covered with orchards or small clusters of trees. Of the agricultural land, 50.5% is used for growing crops, while 2.0% is used for orchards or vine crops. All the water in the municipality is flowing water.

The municipality is located in the Frauenfeld district, between Winterthur and Wil (SG) along the Lützelmurg. It consists of the villages of Aadorf, Aawangen, Ettenhausen, Guntershausen bei Aadorf and Wittenwil.

== Demographics ==
Aadorf has a population (as of December 2020) of 9,216. As of 2008, 14.2% of the population are foreign nationals. Over the last 10 years (1997–2007) the population has changed at a rate of 6%. Most of the population (as of 2000) speaks German (91.2%), with Italian being second most common ( 2.5%) and Albanian being third ( 2.0%).

As of 2008, the gender distribution of the population was 49.7% male and 50.3% female. The population was made up of 3,294 Swiss men (42.1% of the population), and 596 (7.6%) non-Swiss men. There were 3,427 Swiss women (43.8%), and 515 (6.6%) non-Swiss women.

In 2008 there were 60 live births to Swiss citizens and 9 births to non-Swiss citizens, and in same time span there were 56 deaths of Swiss citizens and 5 non-Swiss citizen deaths. Ignoring immigration and emigration, the population of Swiss citizens increased by 4 while the foreign population increased by 4. There were 3 Swiss men who emigrated from Switzerland to another country, 5 Swiss women who emigrated from Switzerland to another country, 43 non-Swiss men who emigrated from Switzerland to another country and 35 non-Swiss women who emigrated from Switzerland to another country. The total Swiss population change in 2008 (from all sources) was an increase of 177 and the non-Swiss population change was an increase of 56 people. This represents a population growth rate of 3.1%.

The age distribution, as of 2009, in Aadorf is; 779 children or 9.8% of the population are between 0 and 9 years old and 1,041 teenagers or 13.0% are between 10 and 19. Of the adult population, 1,010 people or 12.7% of the population are between 20 and 29 years old. 983 people or 12.3% are between 30 and 39, 1,351 people or 16.9% are between 40 and 49, and 1,224 people or 15.3% are between 50 and 59. The senior population distribution is 833 people or 10.4% of the population are between 60 and 69 years old, 484 people or 6.1% are between 70 and 79, there are 237 people or 3.0% who are between 80 and 89, and there are 38 people or 0.5% who are 90 and older.

As of 2000, there were 2,933 private households in the municipality, and an average of 2.4 persons per household. In 2000 there were 1,181 single family homes (or 81.4% of the total) out of a total of 1,451 inhabited buildings. There were 99 two family buildings (6.8%), 42 three family buildings (2.9%) and 129 multi-family buildings (or 8.9%). There were 1,642 (or 22.5%) persons who were part of a couple without children, and 4,032 (or 55.2%) who were part of a couple with children. There were 439 (or 6.0%) people who lived in single parent home, while there are 33 persons who were adult children living with one or both parents, 33 persons who lived in a household made up of relatives, 47 who lived in a household made up of unrelated persons, and 174 who are either institutionalized or live in another type of collective housing.

The vacancy rate for the municipality, in 2008, was 1.21%. As of 2007, the construction rate of new housing units was 5.3 new units per 1000 residents. In 2000 there were 3,090 apartments in the municipality. The most common apartment size was the four-room apartment of which there were 797. There were 90 single-room apartments and 564 apartments with six or more rooms. As of 2000 the average price to rent an average apartment in Aadorf was 1048.91 Swiss francs (CHF) per month (US$840, £470, €670 approx. exchange rate from 2000). The average rate for a one-room apartment was 514.48 CHF (US$410, £230, €330), a two-room apartment was about 751.73 CHF (US$600, £340, €480), a three-room apartment was about 923.69 CHF (US$740, £420, €590) and a six or more room apartment cost an average of 1567.37 CHF (US$1250, £710, €1000). The average apartment price in Aadorf was 94.0% of the national average of 1116 CHF.

In the 2007 federal election the most popular party was the SVP which received 41.73% of the vote. The next three most popular parties were the CVP (18.74%), the SP (10.78%) and the FDP (10.01%). In the federal election, a total of 2,449 votes were cast, and the voter turnout was 46.4%.

The historical population is given in the following table:

| year | population |
|---|---|
| 1850 | 2,205 |
| 1910 | 3,224 |
| 1960 | 4,106 |
| 1990 | 6,880 |
| 2000 | 7,301 |

== Heritage sites of national significance ==
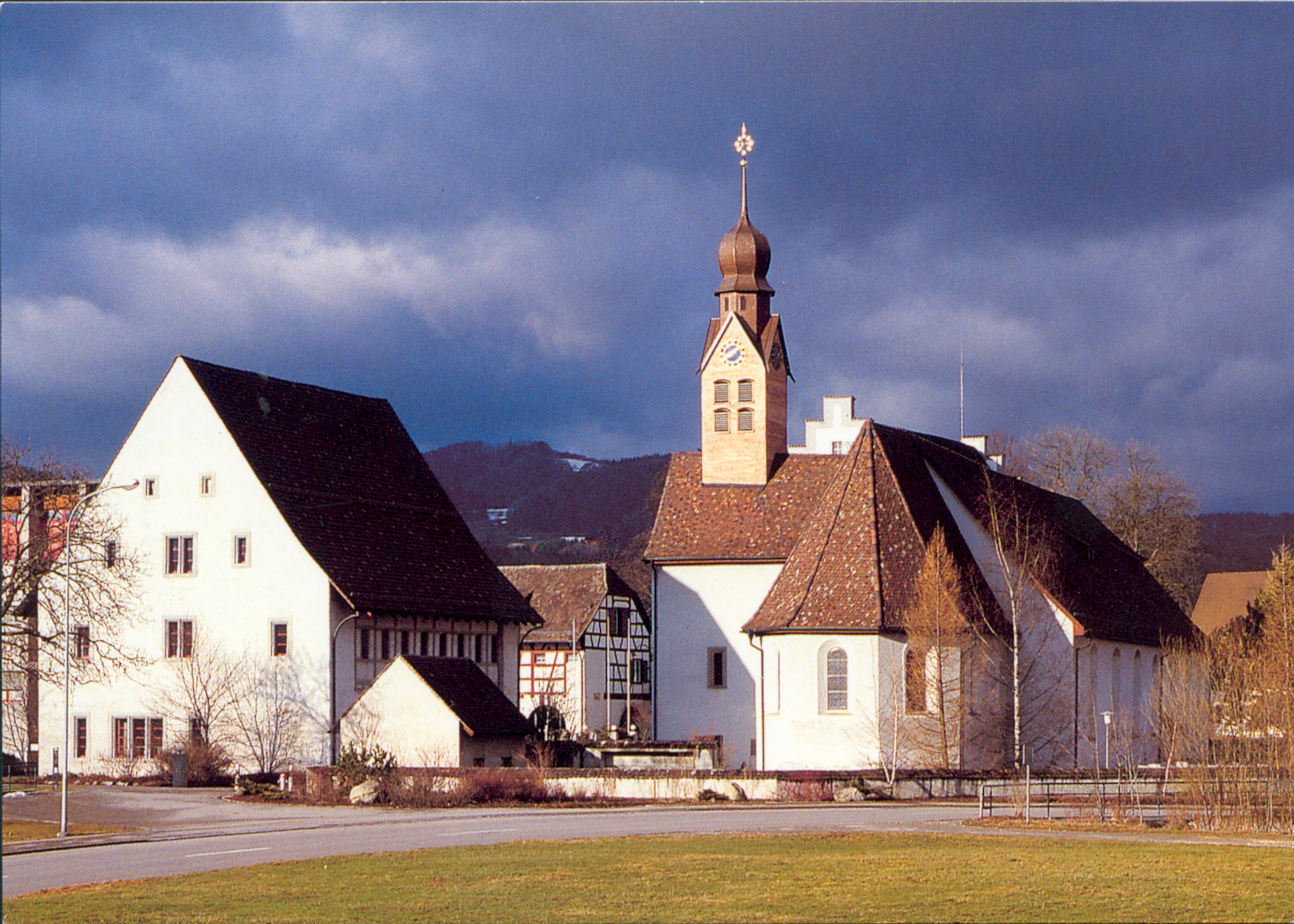
Monastery Church

The Agrotechnorama Tänikon and the former monastery church of St Bernhard are listed as Swiss heritage site of national significance.

The former Cistercian monastery of Tänikon, which included the Church of St Bernhard, was first mentioned in 1247. During the 15th and 16th centuries, portions of the monastery were demolished and later a road was built through the cloister. The monastery buildings eventually became a federal agricultural research facility, the Agrotechnorama Tänikon. The former monastery church includes a marble pulpit and altar by Johann Josef Mosbrugger from 1830 to 1831.

== Economy ==
As of 2007, Aadorf had an unemployment rate of 1.64%. As of 2005, there were 181 people employed in the primary economic sector and about 56 businesses involved in this sector. 1,172 people are employed in the secondary sector and there are 93 businesses in this sector. 1,351 people are employed in the tertiary sector, with 233 businesses in this sector.

In 2000 there were 5,189 workers who lived in the municipality. Of these, 2,419 or about 46.6% of the residents worked outside Aadorf while 1,406 people commuted into the municipality for work. There were a total of 4,176 jobs (of at least 6 hours per week) in the municipality. Of the working population, 15.2% used public transportation to get to work, and 48.1% used a private car.

== Religion ==
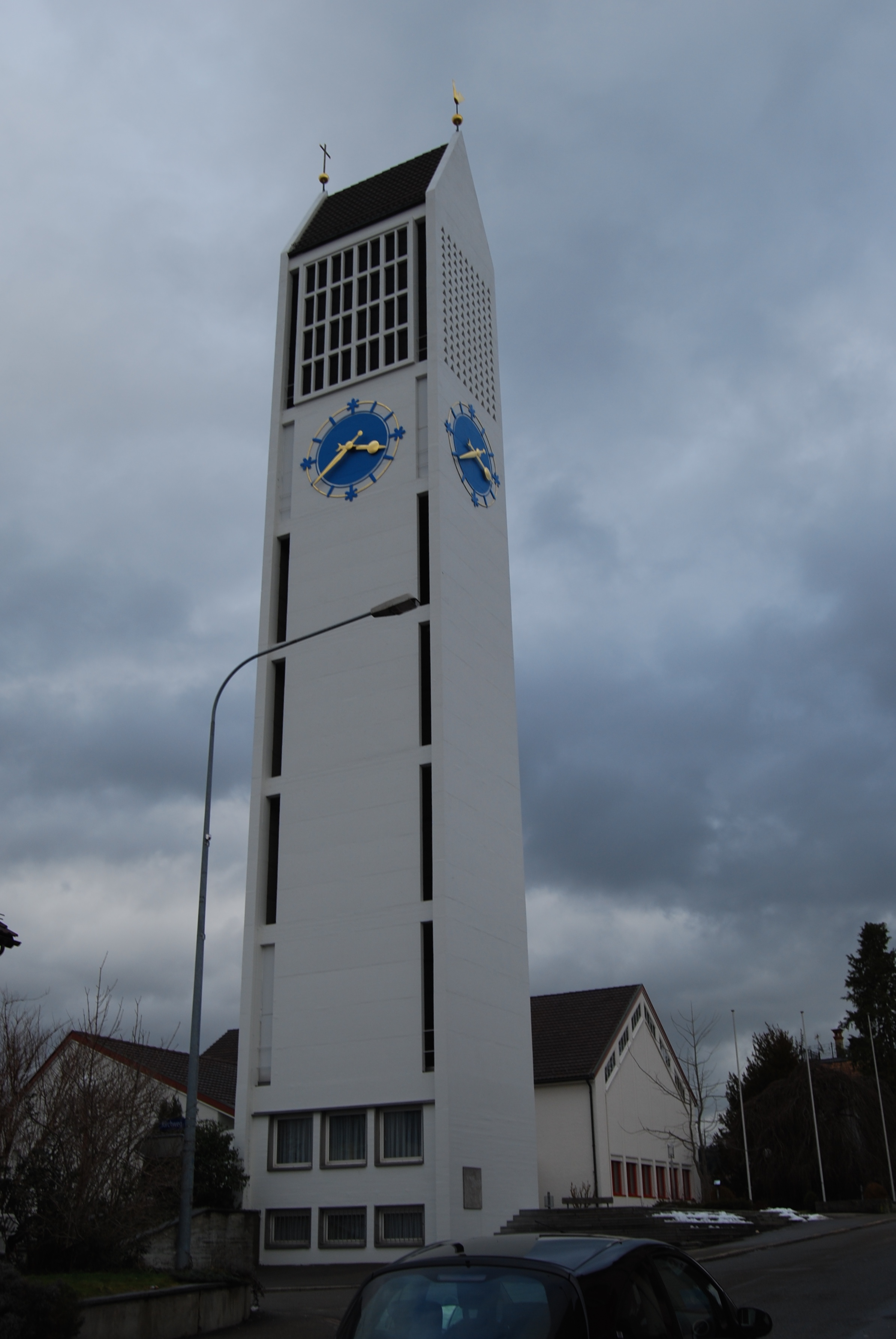
Protestant Church in Aadorf

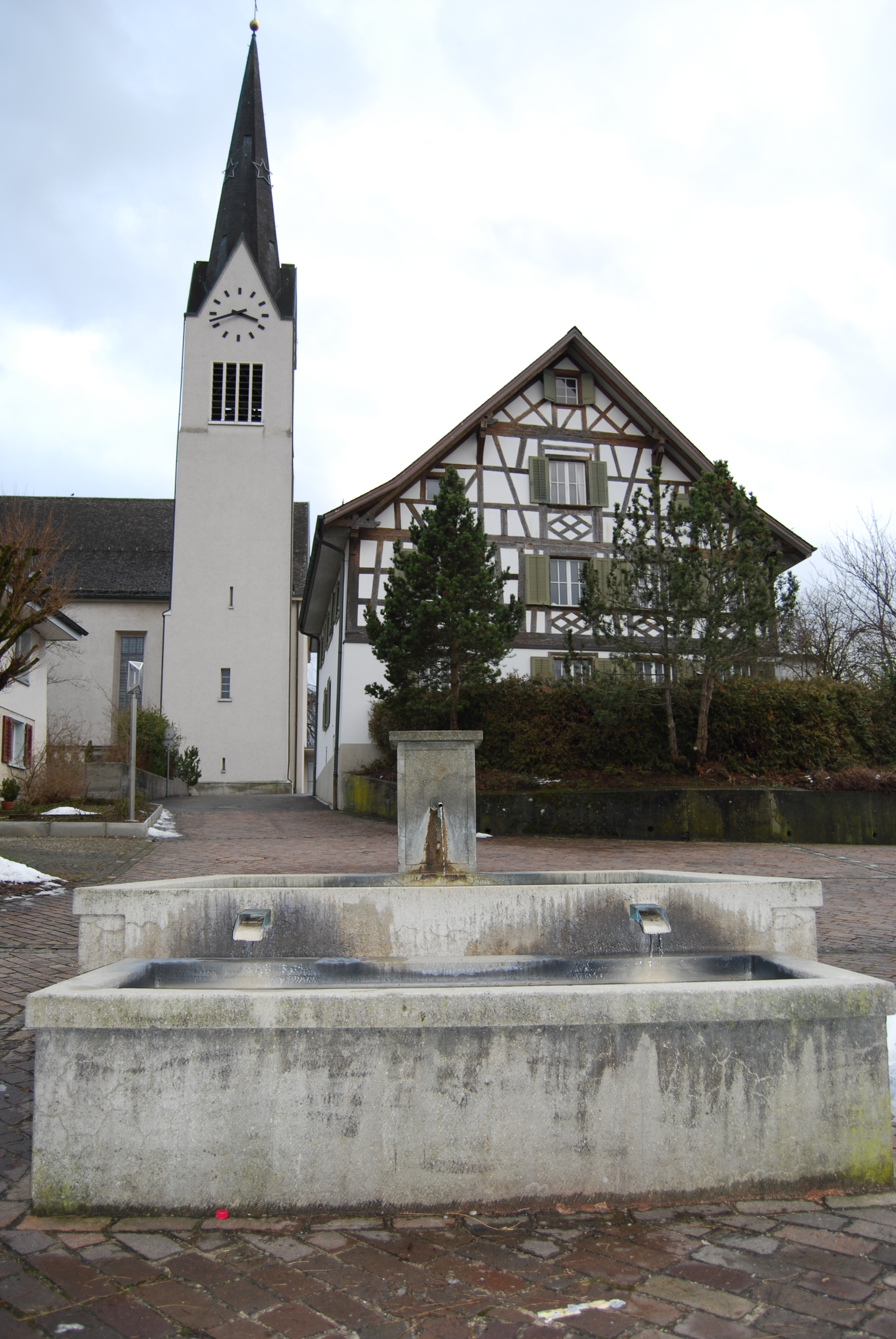
Catholic Church in Aadorf

From the 2000 census, 3,014 or 41.3% were Roman Catholic, while 2,892 or 39.6% belonged to the Swiss Reformed Church. Of the rest of the population, there were 2 Old Catholics (or about 0.03% of the population) who belonged to the Christian Catholic Church of Switzerland there are 66 individuals (or about 0.90% of the population) who belong to the Orthodox Church, and there are 242 individuals (or about 3.31% of the population) who belong to another Christian church. There was 1 individual who was Jewish, and 382 (or about 5.23% of the population) who are Islamic. There are 17 individuals (or about 0.23% of the population) who belong to another church (not listed on the census), 502 (or about 6.88% of the population) belong to no church, are agnostic or atheist, and 183 individuals (or about 2.51% of the population) did not answer the question.

== Education ==
In Aadorf about 75% of the population (between age 25-64) have completed either non-mandatory upper secondary education or additional higher education (either university or a Fachhochschule).

== Crime ==
In 2014 the crime rate, of the over 200 crimes listed in the Swiss Criminal Code (running from murder, robbery and assault to accepting bribes and election fraud), in Aadorf was 33 per thousand residents. This rate is only 74.3% of the cantonal rate and 51.1% of the average rate in the entire country. During the same period, the rate of drug crimes was 2.4 per thousand residents. This rate is lower than average, at only 33.8% of the rate in the district, 50.0% of the cantonal rate and is only 24.2% of the national rate. The rate of violations of immigration, visa and work permit laws was 0.4 per thousand residents. This rate is lower than average at only 13.8% of the rate in the canton and 8.2% of the rate for the entire country.

== Climate ==
Aadorf has either an oceanic or a humid continental climate under the Köppen climate classification. Aadorf has an average of 134.5 days of precipitation per year and on average receives 1,184 mm (46.6 in) of precipitation. The wettest month is June during which time Aadorf receives an average of 124 mm (4.9 in) of rain or snow. During this month there are 12.1 days with precipitation. The month with the most days of precipitation is May, with an average of 12.7, but with only 124 mm (4.9 in) of precipitation. The driest month of the year is February with an average of 73 mm (2.9 in) of precipitation over 10.0 days.

Climate data for Aadorf, elevation 539 m (1,768 ft), (1991–2020)
| Month | Jan | Feb | Mar | Apr | May | Jun | Jul | Aug | Sep | Oct | Nov | Dec | Year |
|---|---|---|---|---|---|---|---|---|---|---|---|---|---|
| Mean daily maximum °C (°F) | 3.3 (37.9) | 4.9 (40.8) | 9.9 (49.8) | 14.4 (57.9) | 18.7 (65.7) | 22.2 (72.0) | 24.2 (75.6) | 23.8 (74.8) | 19.0 (66.2) | 13.6 (56.5) | 7.4 (45.3) | 3.9 (39.0) | 13.8 (56.8) |
| Daily mean °C (°F) | 0.4 (32.7) | 1.0 (33.8) | 4.8 (40.6) | 8.6 (47.5) | 13.0 (55.4) | 16.7 (62.1) | 18.4 (65.1) | 18.0 (64.4) | 13.6 (56.5) | 9.4 (48.9) | 4.3 (39.7) | 1.2 (34.2) | 9.1 (48.4) |
| Mean daily minimum °C (°F) | −2.8 (27.0) | −3.1 (26.4) | −0.1 (31.8) | 2.7 (36.9) | 7.2 (45.0) | 11.0 (51.8) | 12.7 (54.9) | 12.6 (54.7) | 8.8 (47.8) | 5.3 (41.5) | 0.9 (33.6) | −1.9 (28.6) | 4.4 (39.9) |
| Average precipitation mm (inches) | 74.8 (2.94) | 71.0 (2.80) | 79.8 (3.14) | 85.0 (3.35) | 124.7 (4.91) | 124.0 (4.88) | 124.1 (4.89) | 126.0 (4.96) | 90.5 (3.56) | 88.9 (3.50) | 83.2 (3.28) | 96.8 (3.81) | 1,168.8 (46.02) |
| Average snowfall cm (inches) | 18.6 (7.3) | 22.8 (9.0) | 11.5 (4.5) | 2.5 (1.0) | 0.0 (0.0) | 0.0 (0.0) | 0.0 (0.0) | 0.0 (0.0) | 0.0 (0.0) | 0.2 (0.1) | 8.2 (3.2) | 17.6 (6.9) | 81.4 (32.0) |
| Average precipitation days (≥ 1.0 mm) | 10.2 | 9.9 | 10.6 | 10.6 | 12.5 | 11.7 | 11.9 | 11.6 | 10.0 | 10.2 | 10.0 | 12.0 | 131.2 |
| Average snowy days (≥ 1.0 cm) | 5.3 | 5.2 | 3.1 | 0.9 | 0.0 | 0.0 | 0.0 | 0.0 | 0.0 | 0.1 | 1.7 | 4.5 | 20.8 |
| Average relative humidity (%) | 83 | 80 | 75 | 72 | 73 | 73 | 73 | 76 | 81 | 85 | 86 | 85 | 78 |
| Mean monthly sunshine hours | 52.8 | 76.8 | 130.5 | 163.8 | 180.6 | 205.5 | 225.3 | 205.0 | 148.4 | 94.2 | 51.2 | 38.9 | 1,573 |
| Percentage possible sunshine | 24 | 31 | 39 | 45 | 42 | 47 | 52 | 53 | 44 | 32 | 23 | 18 | 40 |
Source 1: NOAA
Source 2: MeteoSwiss (snow 1981–2010)
