= Tänikon Abbey =

Nunnery in Aadorf, Switzerland

Coordinates: 47.47909°N 8.90710°E

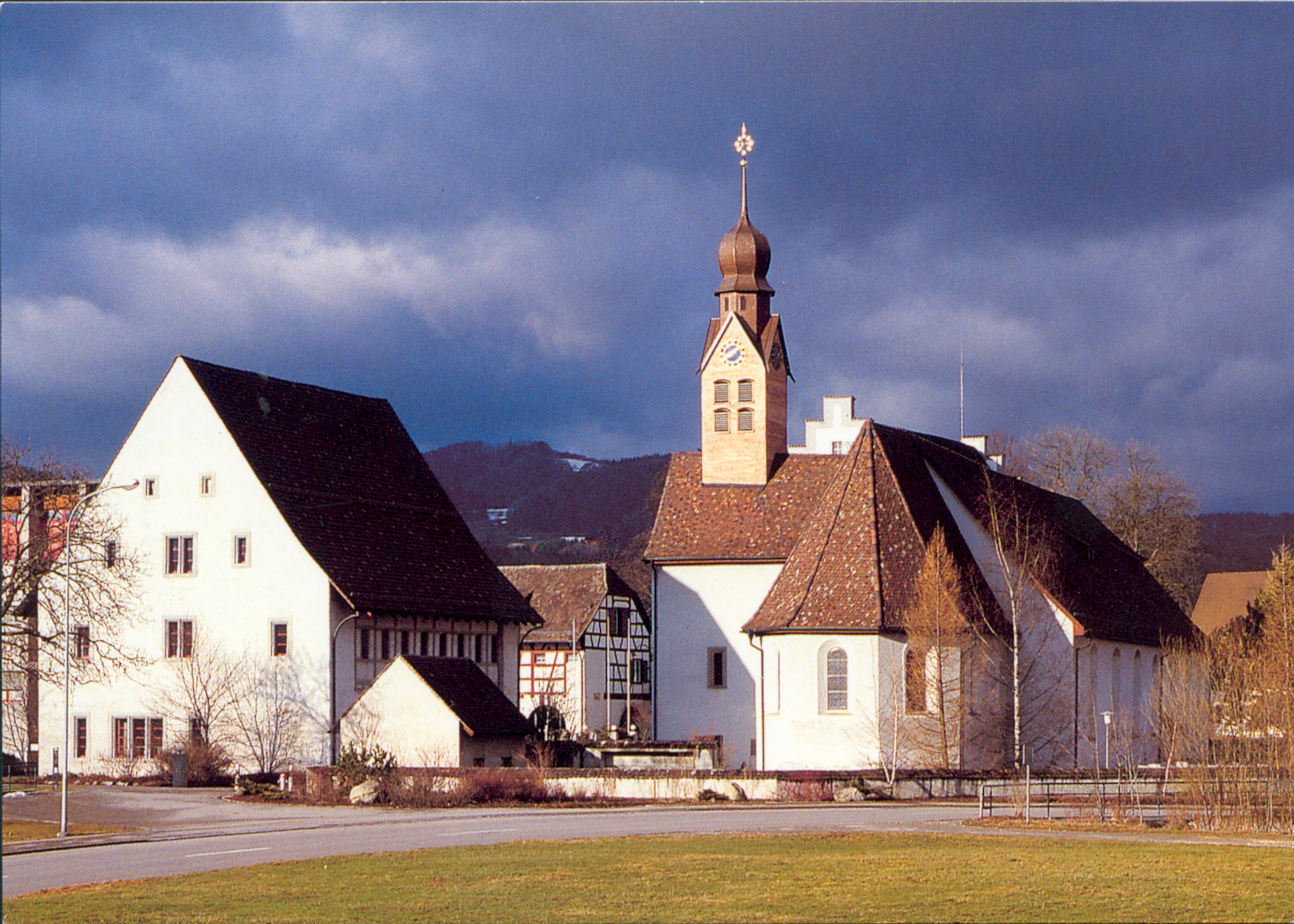
Former monastery church

Tänikon Abbey is a former Cistercian nunnery in the village of Ettenhausen in the municipality of Aadorf in the canton of Thurgau in Switzerland. The former abbey church and the conventual buildings, now Agrotechnorama Tänikon, are both Swiss heritage sites of national significance.

== History ==
Tänikon was first mentioned in 789 as Tanninchova as a local court. In 817 emperor Louis the Pious gave all his lands in Thurgau, including Tänikon, to the Abbey of St. Gall. An established nunnery at Tänikon was first mentioned in 1249. In 1257, the abbey church took over the rights to the nearby chapel of St. Anna. Around the same time Eberhard II and Eberhard III of Bichelsee granted land holdings to the abbey and it became Cistercian. In 1263, Pope Urban IV asked the abbot of Kappel to administer Tänikon. From 1268 the community had a number of lay brothers who lived and worked onsite. They were slowly replaced by secular servants or employees and by 1491 there were no more lay brothers. In 1415 the Hohenlandenberg and Gachnang families donated money to help establish a parish benefice for the chapel. By 1520, the abbey owned land or rights in Aadorf, Bichelsee, Elgg, Ellikon, Ettenhausen, Gerlikon, Guntershausen, Hagenbuch, Krillberg, Lommis, Niederwil, Stettfurt, Tannegg and Tuttwil. In 1508 Abbess Anna Welter of Blidegg built a new refectory on the grounds.

During the Protestant Reformation in 1523 several nuns left the abbey. When the Protestant Council of Zurich visited in 1525, there were still 13 nuns in residence. A few years later, in 1532, the abbess retired though a few sisters remained. Sophia von Grüth was appointed caretaker over the monastery in 1548. Two years later she was raised to be the abbess and the Abbot of Wettingen was appointed as the abbey's Visitor. It became a center of the Counter Reformation and in 1606 all nuns were required strictly to obey the rules of the order. During the 17th century, the community grew and several new buildings were built, including the prelate's house in 1616 and the abbess's house in 1678.

During the wave of secularization that followed the Helvetic Republic, much of the abbey's land was nationalized. After 1804, the community were virtually forbidden to accept any new novitiates. The Thurgau Cantonal Constitution of 1831 placed all the abbey's assets under state control. In 1836, the canton appointed a trustee and sold off the lands. In 1848 the Grand Council of Thurgau dissolved the abbey and took over the buildings. Two years later, 1850, they sold the nunnery and chapel to the Planta family and the Tänikon parish church. In 1853, the nuns moved into the former Capuchin friary at Frauenfeld. In 1869 they moved again to Mariastern Abbey in Vorarlberg in Austria. The premises were sold in 1936 to Otto Zuber and in 1969 were taken over by the new Eidgenossenschaft Forschungsanstalt für Betriebswirtschaft und Landtechnik (Swiss Federal Institute of Business and Agriculture), which in 2006 became the Agrotechnorama Tänikon.

During the 15th and 16th centuries, parts of the abbey were demolished and later a road was built through the cloister. The former abbey church includes a marble pulpit and altar by Johann Josef Mosbrugger from 1830-31.

=== List of the Abbesses ===
Abbess	Date in office
Hemma	until c. 1270
Elisabeth	c. 1270 – 1285
Guta von Bichelsee	1285? – 1305
Ite or Idda	1305 – 1309
Adelheid	1309 – 1335
Katharina Rinwin	1335 – 1347
Ita	1347 – 1360?
Clara von Lindenberg	1360? – 1371
Ita von Schlatt	1371 – 1380?
Clara von Gachnang	1380? – 1387
Elisabeth Rüdlinger	1387 – 1398?
Anna von Gachnang	1398? – 1415
Katharina Schenk von Landegg	1415 – 1430?
Anna Schlatter	1430? – 1436
Ursula von Eppenberg	1436 – 1460?
Dorothea von Heudorf	1460? – 1504
Anna Wälter I. von Blidegg	1504 – 1521?
Amalia Gnäpser	1521? – 1524
Anna Wälter II. von Blidegg	1524 – 1532
Sophia von Grüt	1548 – 1579
Barbara von Hertenstein	1579 – 1608
Veronika von Grüt	1608 – 1617
Anna von Wellenberg	1617 – 1623
Magdalena Hoppler	1623 – 1639
Marie Salome Schmid	1639 – 1677
Maria Victoria von Beroldingen	1677 – 1687
Maria Elisabeth Dietrich	1687 – 1707
Maria Euphemia Zurlauben	1707 – 1737
Euphemia Dorothea Ceberg	1737 – 1762
Maria Barbara Rüti	1762 – 1773
Maria Katharina Weiss	1773 – 1796
Dominika Agatha Seiler	1796 – 1827
Maria Johanna Baptista Rutz	1827 – 1848

== Agrotechnorama Tänikon ==
The Agrotechnorama Tänikon is a museum dedicated to the development of agricultural technology in the 19th and 20th centuries. The museum occupies the 1,800 m^{2} (19,000 ft^{2}) former abbey barn and includes about 750 objects from 1813 to 1984 showing the transition from manual labor to animal powered and mechanized farming. The museum is open by appointment only.
