= Kris Vietze =

Swiss businesswoman and politician

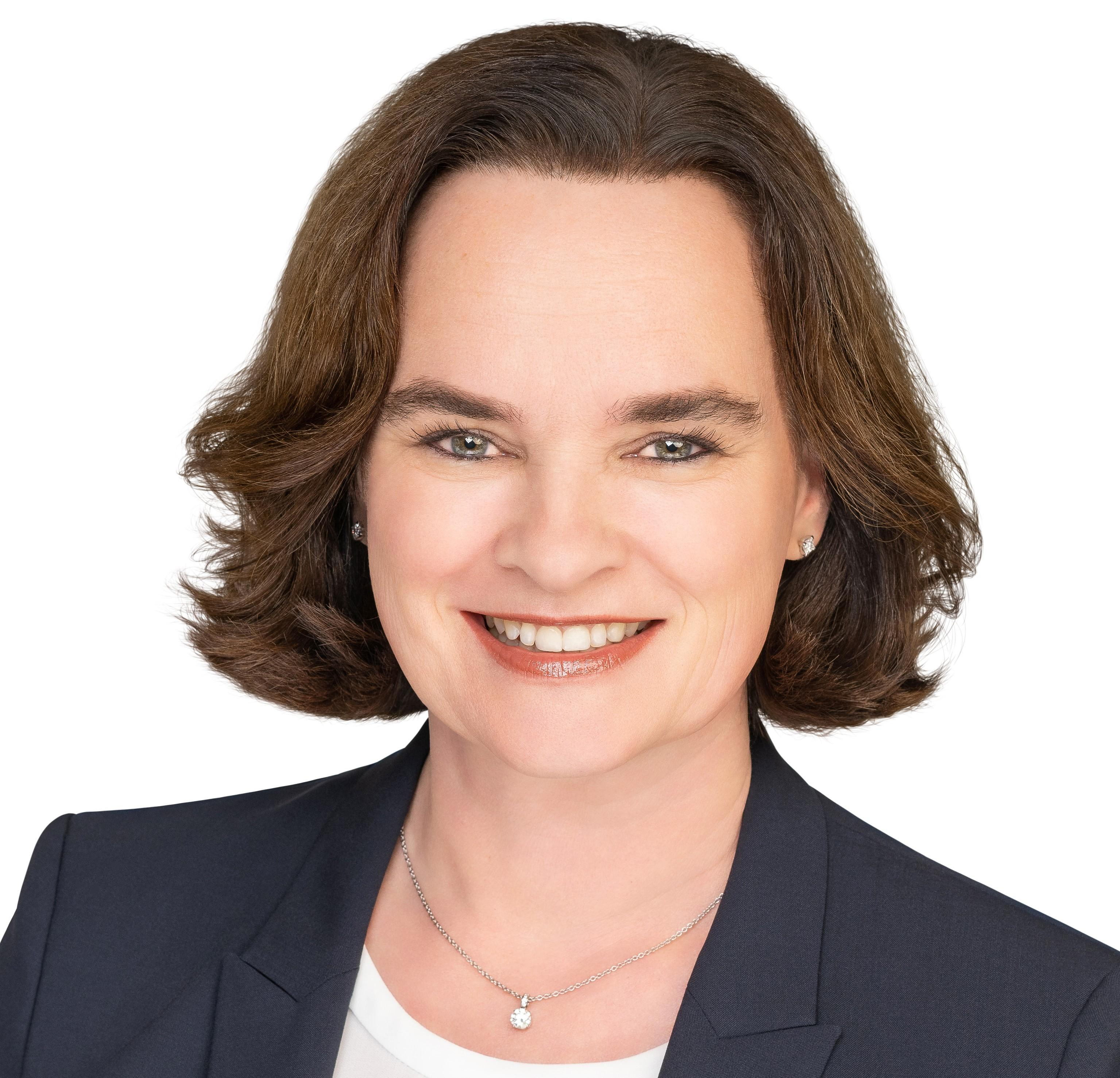

Member of the National Council
- Incumbent
- Assumed office 4 December 2023
- Constituency: Canton of Thurgau

Personal details
- Born: Kristiane Eickstädt
- Spouse: Oliver Vietze
- Children: 2
- Occupation: Businesswoman, consultant, auditor, politician
- Website: Official website Parliament website

Kristiane Vietze colloquially Kris Vietze (German pronunciation: [kʁɪs ˈfiːtsə]; née Eickstädt; born 27 May 1968 in Mayen, West Germany) is a Swiss businesswoman and politician who currently serves as a member of the National Council for The Liberals since 2023. She previously served on the Grand Council of Thurgau since 2012.

Vietze and her husband are controlling shareholders of Baumer Group, a sensor technology company, headquartered in Frauenfeld. She is also serves on a variety of nonprofit boards.

== Early life and education ==
Vietze was born Kristiane Eickstädt on 27 May 1968, to Rolf E. Eickstädt, a former pilot and instructor of Swissair, and Jutta Eickstädt, a former kindergarten teacher. Her parents where originally from Germany. Vietze studied economics at the University of Zurich and completed a PhD at ETH Zurich. Additionally she completed a federal diploma as auditor.

== Political career ==
Since 2012, Vietze served on the Grand Council of Thurgau. She was elected into National Council during the 2023 Swiss federal election and assumed office on 4 December 2023.
