= Guntershausen bei Aadorf =

Coordinates: 47.467°N 8.900°E

Guntershausen bei Aadorf is a village and former municipality in the district of Frauenfeld in the canton of Thurgau, Switzerland.

It was first recorded in 1282 as Gundolthuser tal.

The municipality also contained the villages Maischhausen, Tänikon and Wittershausen. It had 473 inhabitants in 1850, which increased to 400 in 1870, 656 in 1960, 1051 in 1990 and 1392 in 2008.

In 1996 the municipality was incorporated into the larger, neighboring municipality Aadorf.

== Notable residents ==
- Caroline Farner
