= Gachnang =

- Municipality
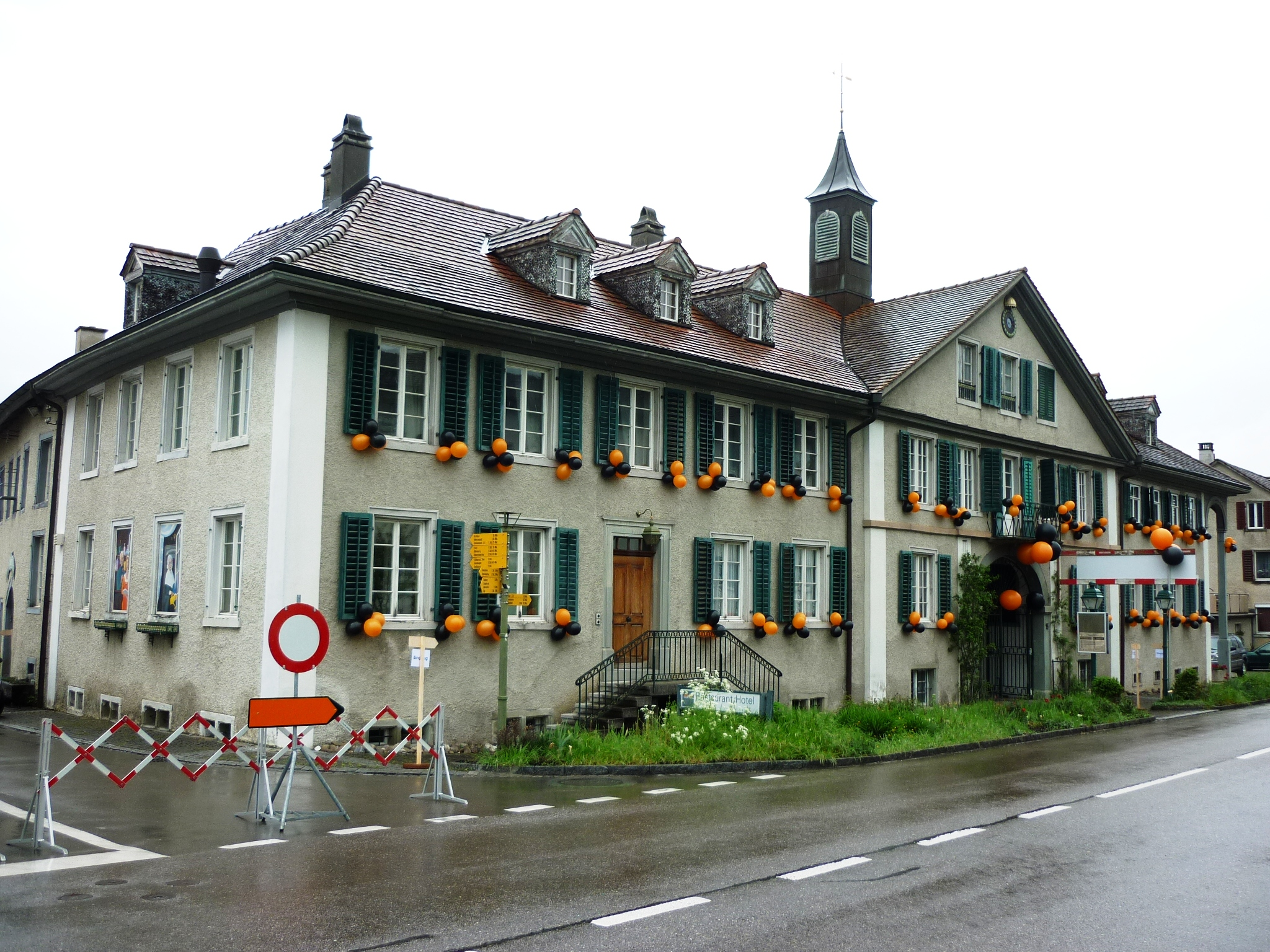

- Flag Coat of arms
- Location of Gachnang
- Location within Switzerland Location within Canton of Thurgau
- Coordinates: 47°32′N 8°51′E
- Country: Switzerland
- Canton: Thurgau
- District: Frauenfeld

Area
  - Total: 9.7 km^{2} (3.7 sq mi)
- Elevation: 465 m (1,526 ft)

Population (December 2007)
  - Total: 3,298
  - Density: 340/km^{2} (880/sq mi)
- Time zone: UTC+01:00 (CET)
  - Summer (DST): UTC+02:00 (CEST)
- Postal code: 8547
- SFOS number: 4571
- ISO 3166 code: CH-TG
- Surrounded by: Bertschikon bei Attikon (ZH), Ellikon an der Thur (ZH), Frauenfeld
- Website: www.gachnang.ch

Gachnang is a municipality in the district of Frauenfeld in the canton of Thurgau in Switzerland.

== History ==
Gachnang is first mentioned in 889 as Kachanang. In the local dialect it has traditionally been known as Gochlingen.

In the Egelsee area (north of Niederwil) a number of significant artifacts from the Pfyn culture have been discovered. In 889 King Arnulf gave his follower Diethelm a manor house in Gachnang with ten manorial hides (Huben). From the 11th Century, Gachnang was a possession of the monastery of Reichenau. The Lords of Gachnang administered the village as a Ministerialis (unfree knights in the service of a feudal overlord) for first the Kyburg and later Reichenau Abbey. They ruled from the, now ruined, Alt-Gachnang Castle or from the Meierhof Meiersberg. During 1336 a family which took on the von Gachnang name were given the Gachnang Castle and the lands surrounding it. In 1417, the Lords of Schinen began to rule over the village. Before 1500, they built Neu-Gachnang Castle. In 1562, the village was acquired by Kaspar Ludwig von Heidenheim, then in 1587 by Hector von Beroldingen and 1623 by Einsiedeln Abbey. The Abbey retained the low justice rights until 1798.

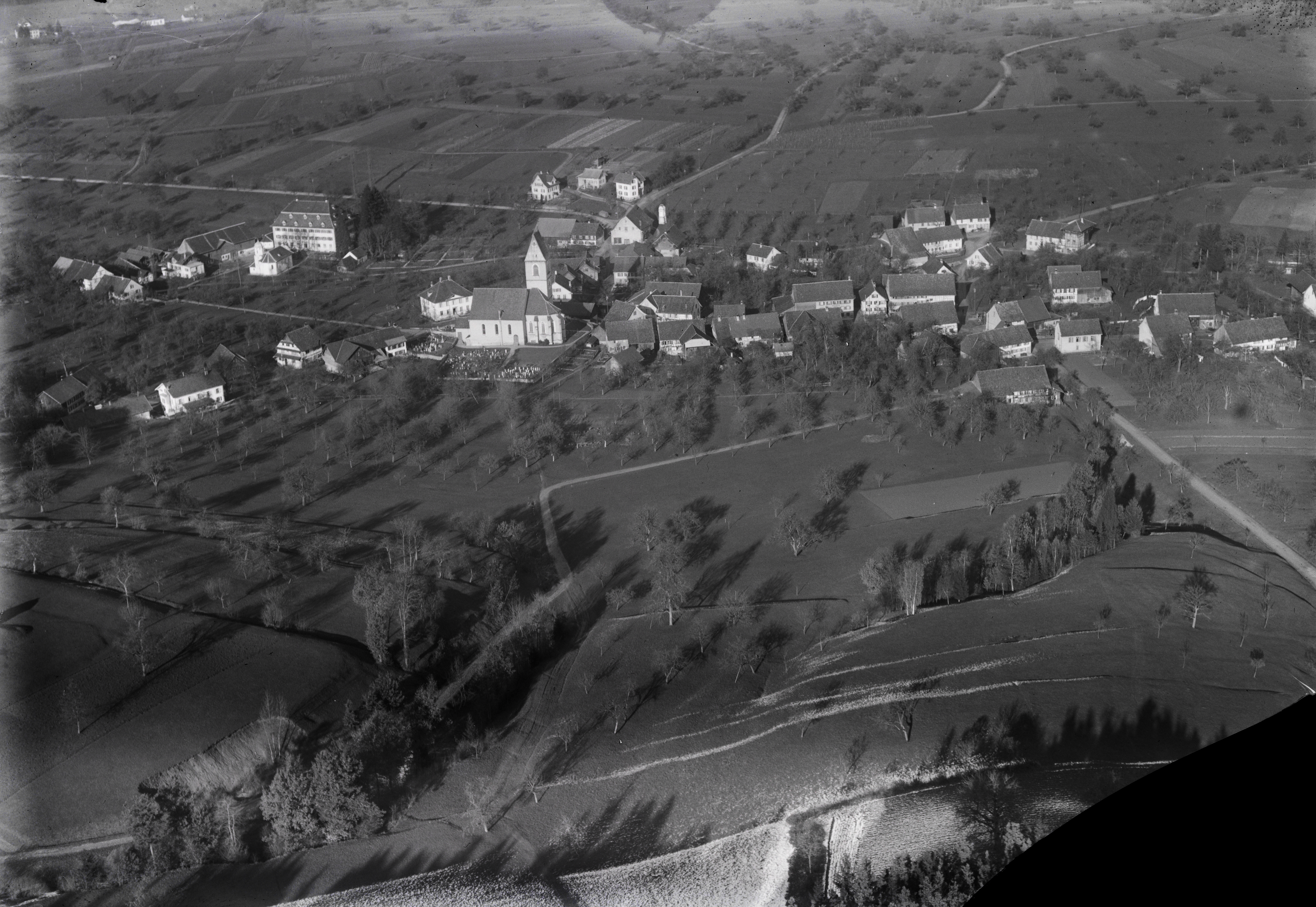
Aerial view from 300 m by Walter Mittelholzer (1923)

The parish of Gachnang existed well before 1000 and included a number of villages in the Thurgau and Zurich area, including the filial church at Ellikon an der Thur (until 1651) and Gerlikon (until 1874). The construction of the current church took place before the 13th Century. The border between the counties of Kyburg and Thurgau (now the boundary between the cantons of Zurich and Thurgau) ran through the middle of the parish, starting in 1427. In 1528 the entire municipality converted to the Protestant Reformation. In the wake of Gachnangerhandels of 1610 the parish was divided, and the (built in 1587) Catholic chapel became a parish church. The right to appoint a priest was held by Reichenau and the Bishop of Constance.

The farming village has not grown far from the medieval settlement centers of the church and castle. Only since the mid-20th Century has the village expanded into a typical residential community. In 1998 the villages of Kefikon, Islikon, Niederwil and Oberwil merged with Gachnang.

== Geography ==
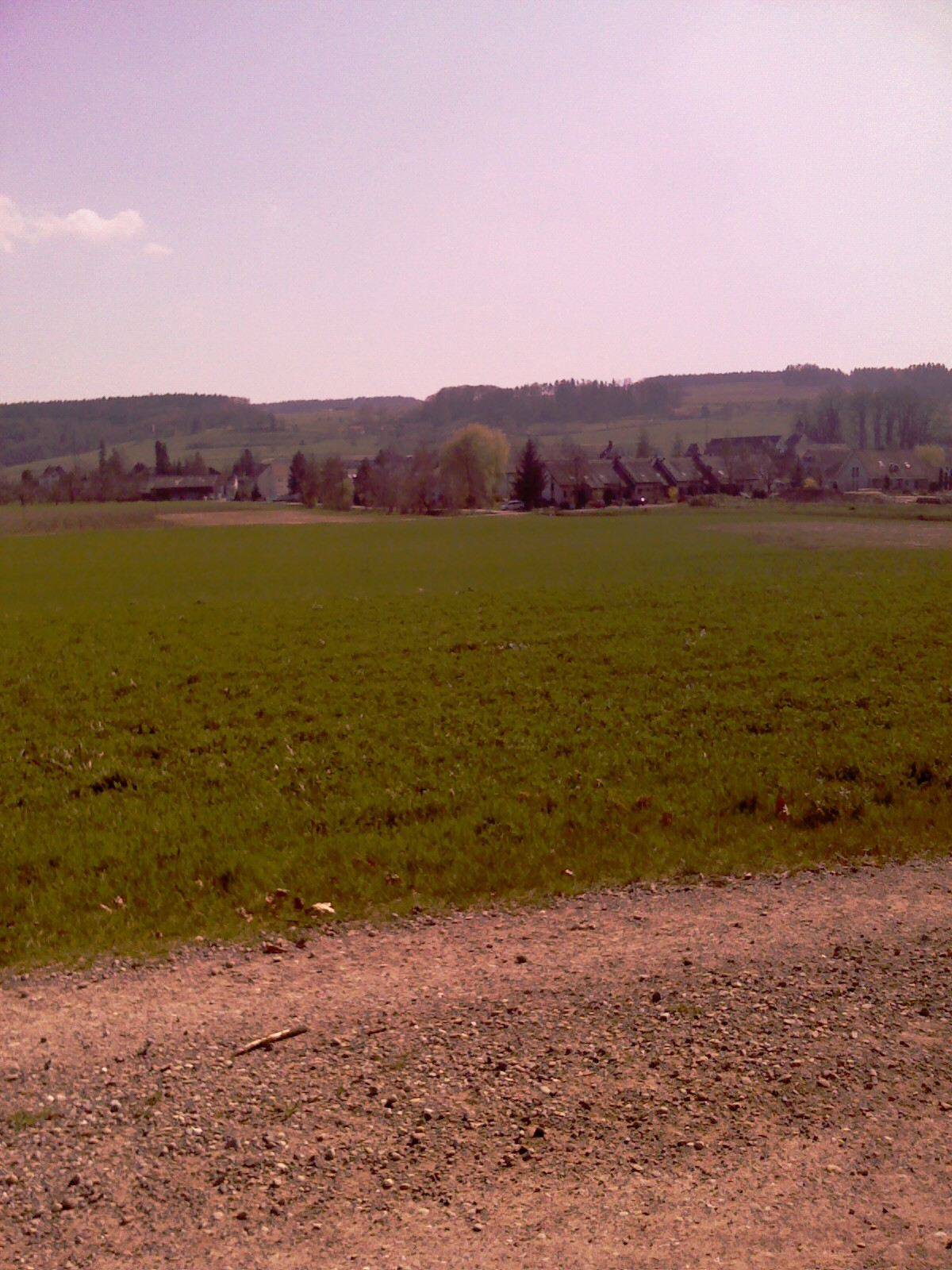
Farm land in Kefikon village

Gachnang has an area, as of 2009, of 9.72 square kilometers (3.75 sq mi). Of this area, 6.32 km^{2} (2.44 sq mi) or 65.0% is used for agricultural purposes, while 1.62 km^{2} (0.63 sq mi) or 16.7% is forested. Of the rest of the land, 1.74 km^{2} (0.67 sq mi) or 17.9% is settled (buildings or roads), 0.04 km^{2} (9.9 acres) or 0.4% is either rivers or lakes and 0.06 km^{2} (15 acres) or 0.6% is unproductive land.

Of the built up area, industrial buildings made up 8.2% of the total area while housing and buildings made up 1.6% and transportation infrastructure made up 1.2%. while parks, green belts and sports fields made up 6.5%. Out of the forested land, 14.9% of the total land area is heavily forested and 1.7% is covered with orchards or small clusters of trees. Of the agricultural land, 63.1% is used for growing crops, while 2.0% is used for orchards or vine crops. Of the water in the municipality, 0.2% is in lakes and 0.2% is in rivers and streams.

The municipality is located in the Frauenfeld district. It consists of the villages of Gachnang, Kefikon, Islikon and Niederwil and the hamlets of Strass and Bethelhausen as well as Oberwil with Rosenhuben.

== Demographics ==
Gachnang has a population (as of December 2020) of 4,483. As of 2008, 10.7% of the population are foreign nationals. Most of the population (as of 2000) speaks Swiss German (93.3%), with Italian being second most common ( 2.7%) and Albanian being third ( 0.7%).

As of 2008, the gender distribution of the population was 50.7% male and 49.3% female. The population was made up of 1,515 Swiss men (45.0% of the population), and 191 (5.7%) non-Swiss men. There were 1,491 Swiss women (44.3%), and 169 (5.0%) non-Swiss women.

In 2008 there were 24 live births to Swiss citizens and 2 births to non-Swiss citizens, and in same time span there were 22 deaths of Swiss citizens. Ignoring immigration and emigration, the population of Swiss citizens increased by 2 while the foreign population increased by 2. There were 1 Swiss woman who emigrated from Switzerland to another country, 12 non-Swiss men who emigrated from Switzerland to another country and 6 non-Swiss women who emigrated from Switzerland to another country. The total Swiss population change in 2008 (from all sources) was an increase of 42 and the non-Swiss population change was an increase of 18 people. This represents a population growth rate of 1.8%.

The age distribution, as of 2009, in Gachnang is; 397 children or 11.6% of the population are between 0 and 9 years old and 460 teenagers or 13.4% are between 10 and 19. Of the adult population, 400 people or 11.7% of the population are between 20 and 29 years old. 432 people or 12.6% are between 30 and 39, 655 people or 19.1% are between 40 and 49, and 512 people or 15.0% are between 50 and 59. The senior population distribution is 351 people or 10.3% of the population are between 60 and 69 years old, 145 people or 4.2% are between 70 and 79, there are 61 people or 1.8% who are between 80 and 89, and there are 10 people or 0.3% who are 90 and older.

As of 2000, there were 1,124 private households in the municipality, and an average of 2.5 persons per household. In 2000 there were 578 single family homes (or 86.9% of the total) out of a total of 665 inhabited buildings. There were 33 two family buildings (5.0%), 16 three family buildings (2.4%) and 38 multi-family buildings (or 5.7%). There were 693 (or 23.8%) persons who were part of a couple without children, and 1,707 (or 58.7%) who were part of a couple with children. There were 110 (or 3.8%) people who lived in single parent home, while there are 20 persons who were adult children living with one or both parents, 5 persons who lived in a household made up of relatives, 17 who lived in a household made up of unrelated persons, and 52 who are either institutionalized or live in another type of collective housing.

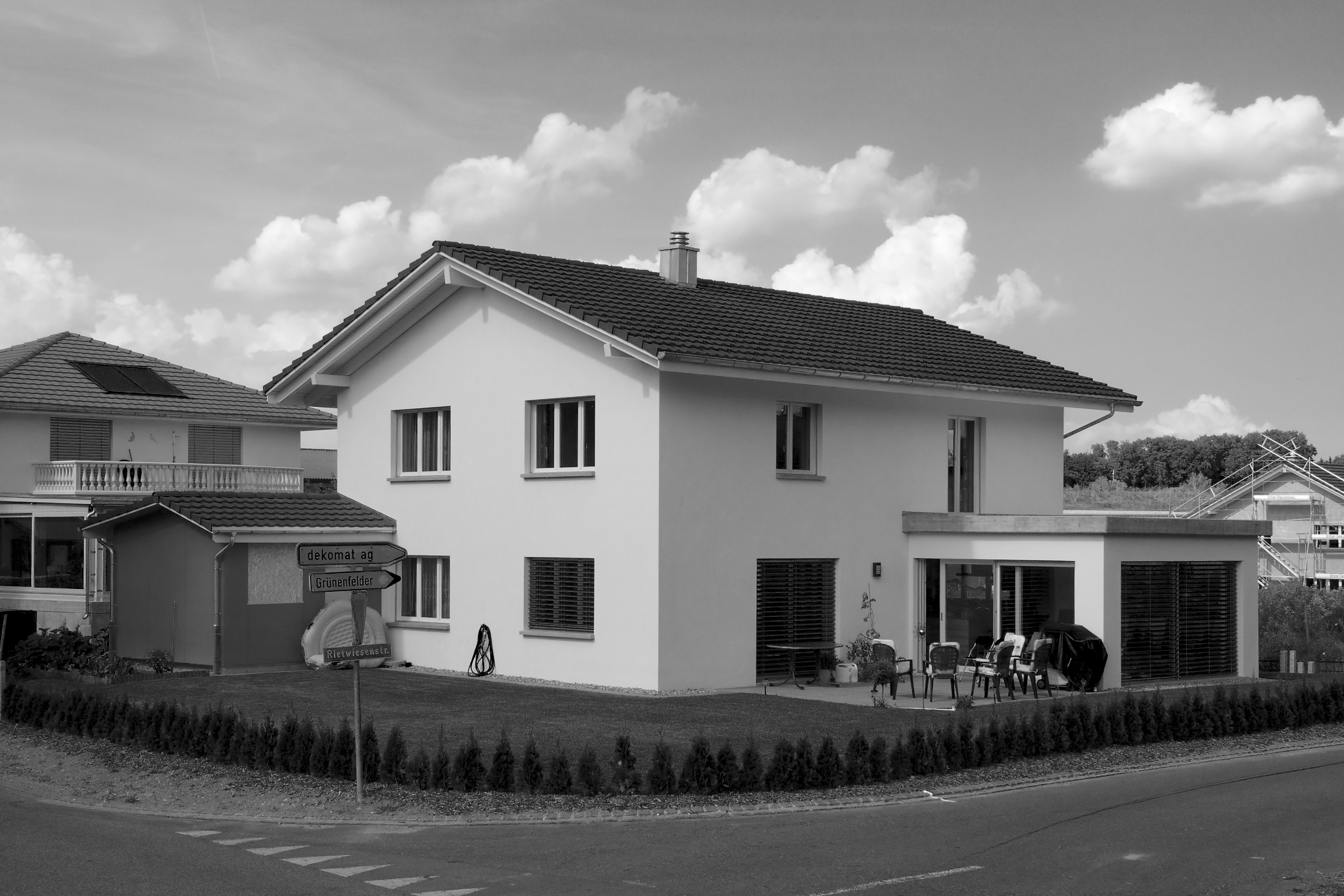
Newly built house in Kefikon village

The vacancy rate for the municipality, in 2008, was 1.04%. As of 2007, the construction rate of new housing units was 5.7 new units per 1000 residents. In 2000 there were 1,205 apartments in the municipality. The most common apartment size was the 4 room apartment of which there were 345. There were 16 single room apartments and 224 apartments with six or more rooms. As of 2000 the average price to rent an average apartment in Gachnang was 1099.05 Swiss francs (CHF) per month (US$880, £490, €700 approx. exchange rate from 2000). The average rate for a one-room apartment was 486.67 CHF (US$390, £220, €310), a two-room apartment was about 858.07 CHF (US$690, £390, €550), a three-room apartment was about 920.39 CHF (US$740, £410, €590) and a six or more room apartment cost an average of 1628.29 CHF (US$1300, £730, €1040). The average apartment price in Gachnang was 98.5% of the national average of 1116 CHF.

In the 2007 federal election the most popular party was the SVP which received 45.49% of the vote. The next three most popular parties were the CVP (13.32%), the SP (12.79%) and the Green Party (10.89%). In the federal election, a total of 1,107 votes were cast, and the voter turnout was 48.5%.

The historical population is given in the following table:

| year | population |
|---|---|
| 1850 | 1,456 |
| 1900 | 1,368 |
| 1950 | 1,694 |
| 1990 | 3,038 |
| 2000 | 2,906 |

== Heritage sites of national significance ==
The Egelsee (prehistoric shore front settlement) and Former Factory Greuterhof with a Barn are listed as Swiss heritage site of national significance. The prehistoric settlement at Egelsee is part of the Prehistoric Pile dwellings around the Alps a UNESCO World Heritage Site.

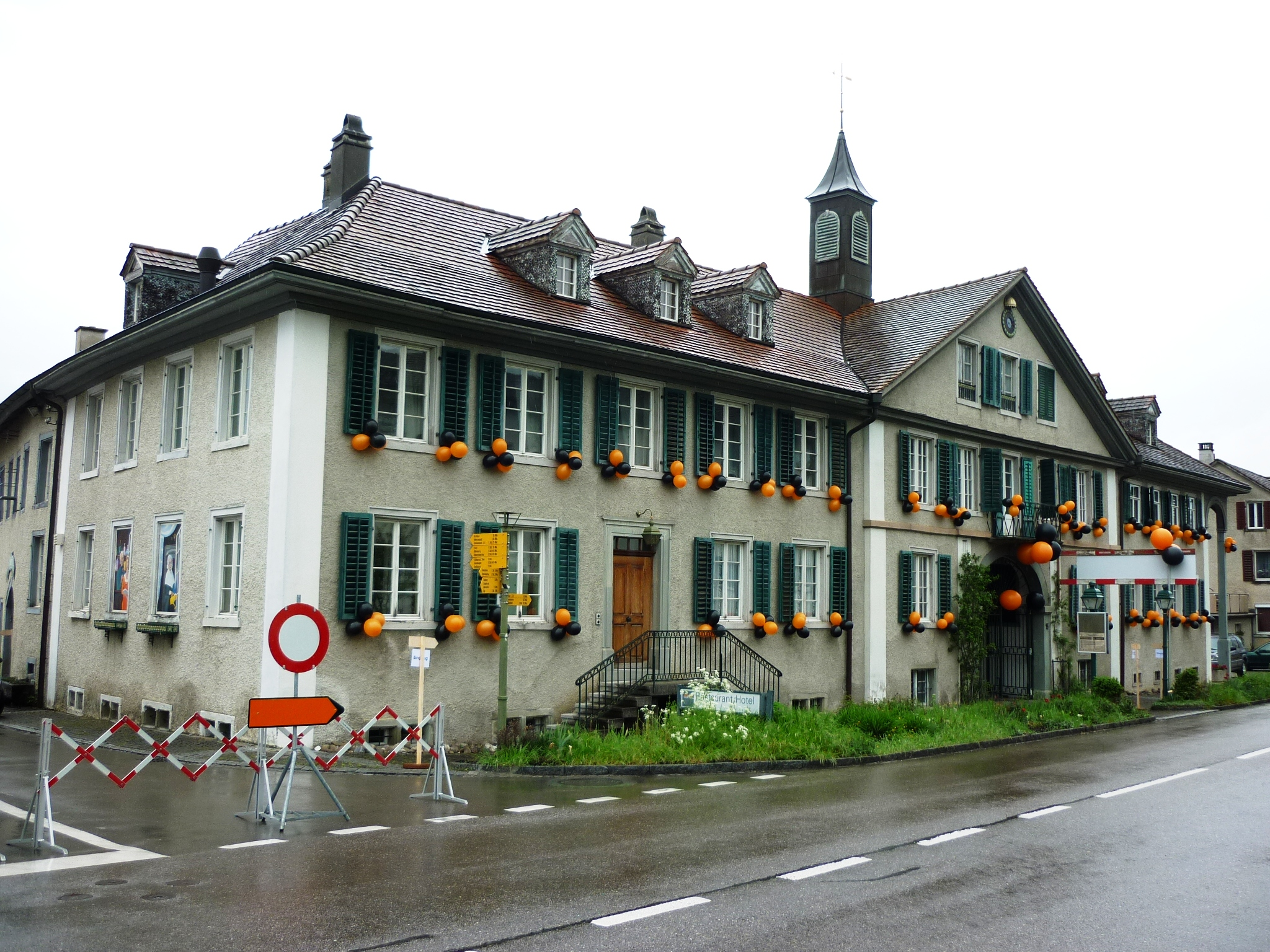
Greuterhof

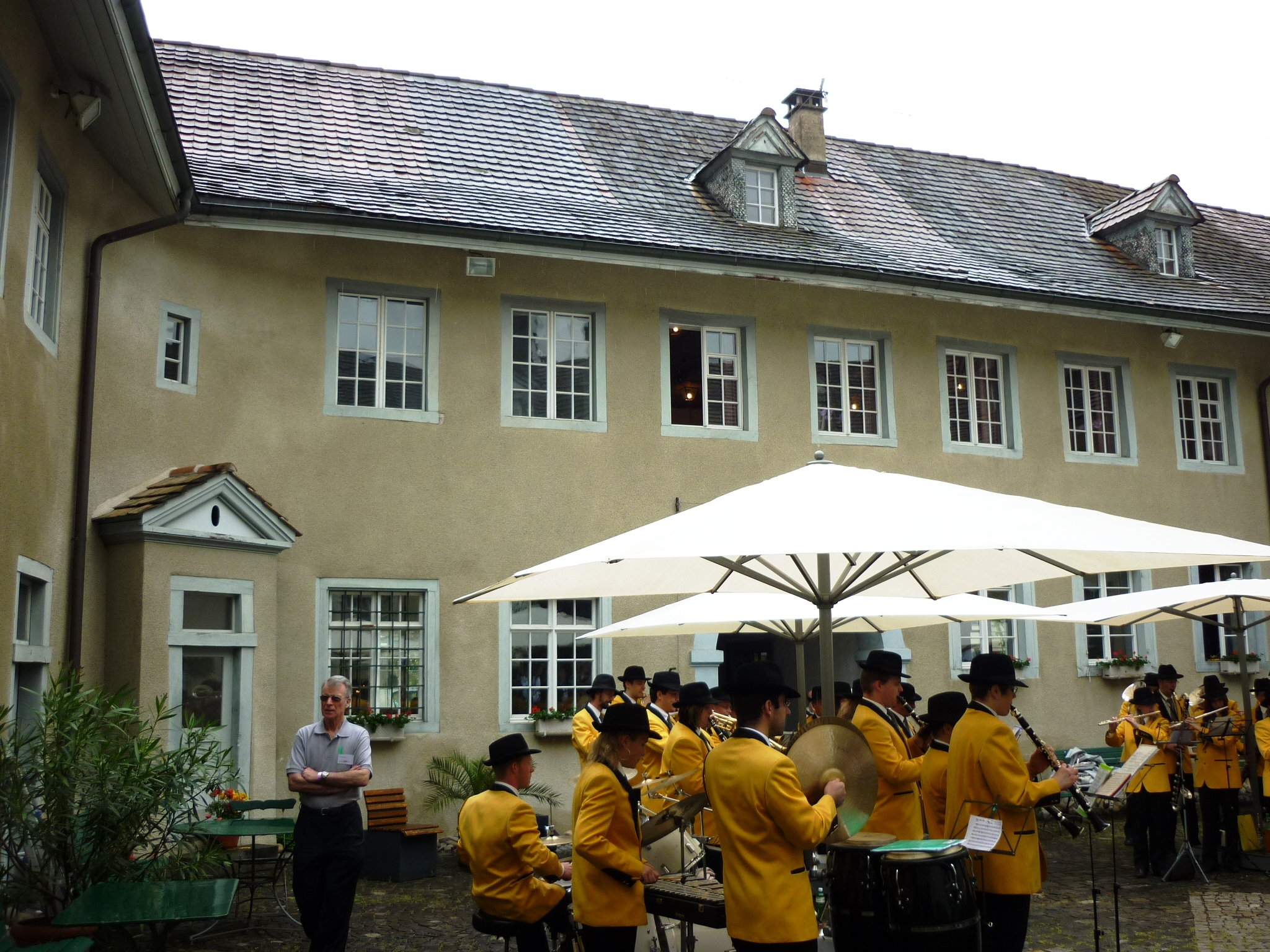
Greuterhof

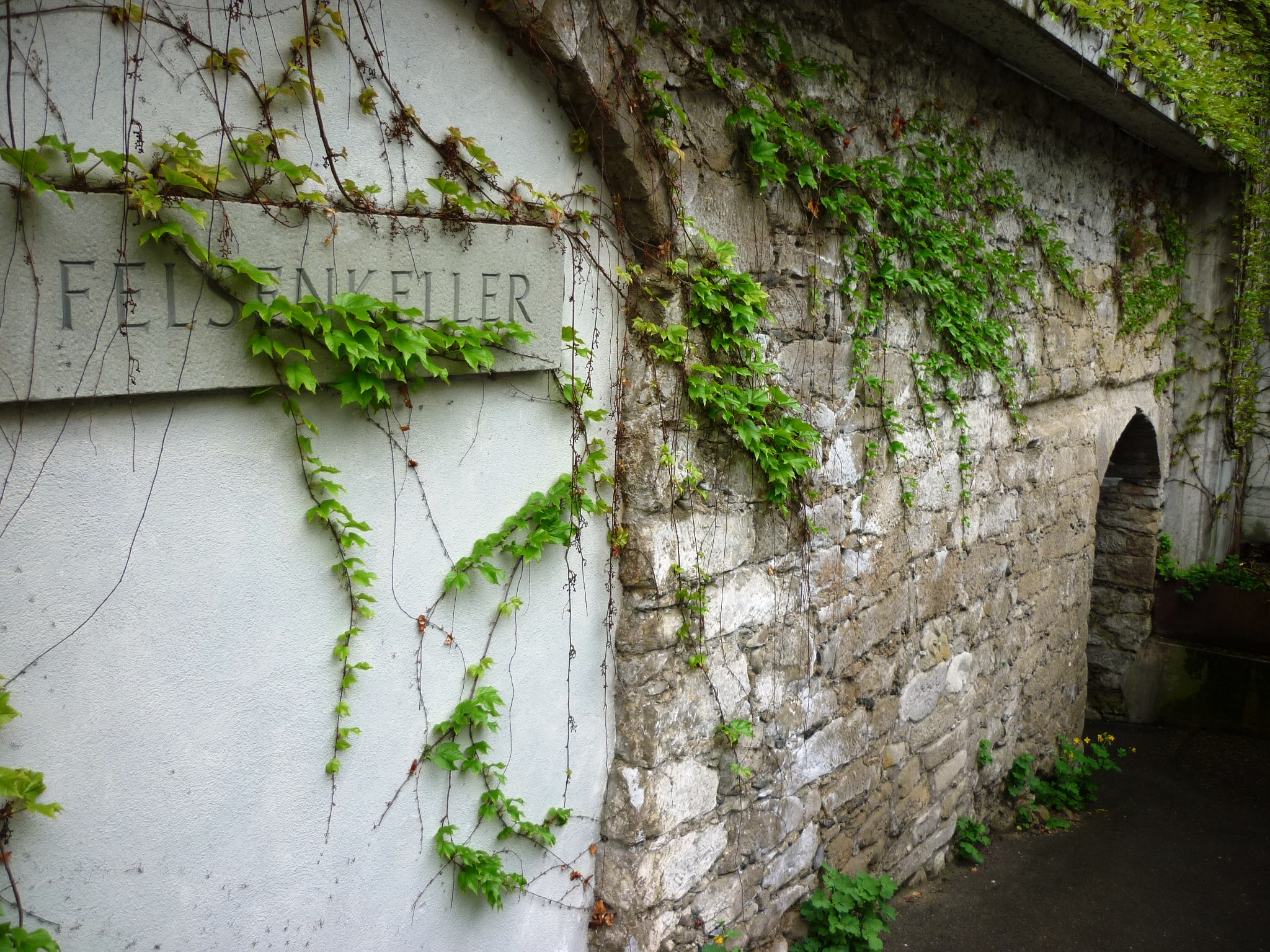
Greuterhof

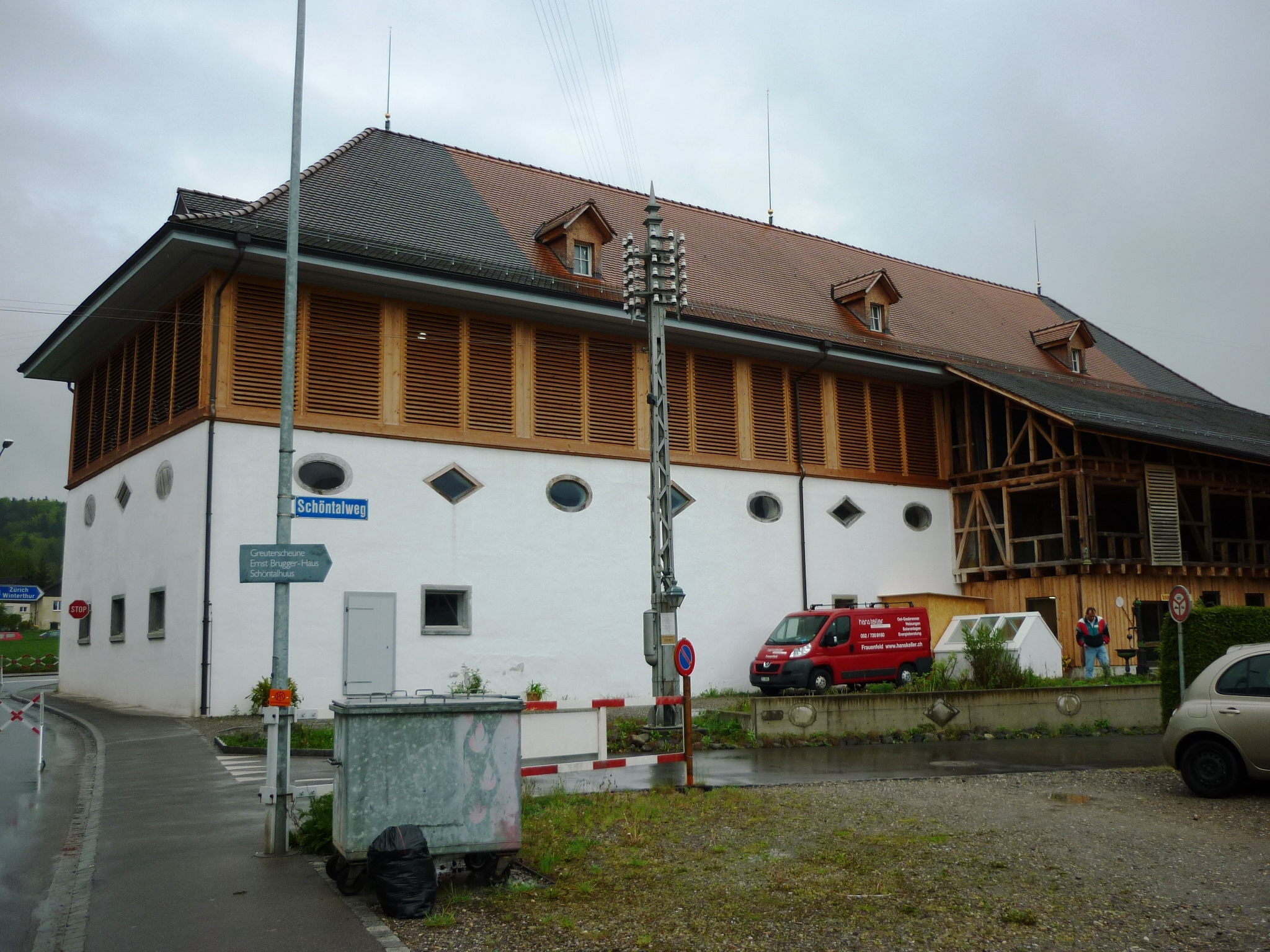
Greuterhof barn

== Economy ==
As of 2007, Gachnang had an unemployment rate of 1.16%. As of 2005, there were 98 people employed in the primary economic sector and about 34 businesses involved in this sector. 370 people are employed in the secondary sector and there are 43 businesses in this sector. 465 people are employed in the tertiary sector, with 96 businesses in this sector.

In 2000 there were 2,134 workers who lived in the municipality. Of these, 1,243 or about 58.2% of the residents worked outside Gachnang while 514 people commuted into the municipality for work. There were a total of 1,405 jobs (of at least 6 hours per week) in the municipality. Of the working population, 13.8% used public transportation to get to work, and 53.9% used a private car.

== Religion ==
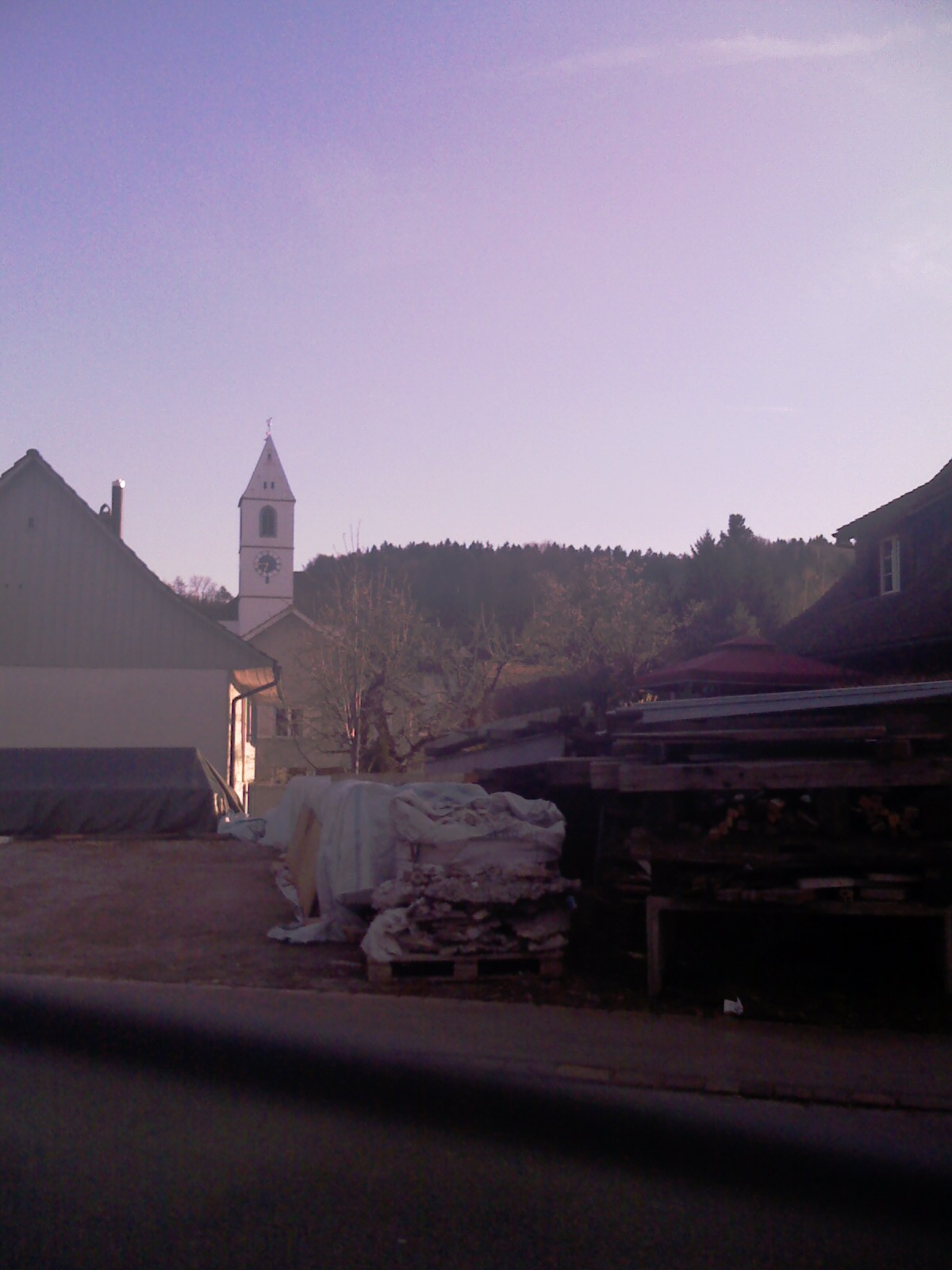
Gachnang Church

From the 2000 census, 820 or 28.2% were Roman Catholic, while 1,560 or 53.7% belonged to the Swiss Reformed Church. Of the rest of the population, there were 2 Old Catholics (or about 0.07% of the population) who belonged to the Christian Catholic Church of Switzerland there are 24 individuals (or about 0.83% of the population) who belong to the Orthodox Church, and there are 111 individuals (or about 3.82% of the population) who belong to another Christian church. There was 1 individual who was Jewish, and 58 (or about 2.00% of the population) who are Islamic. There are 16 individuals (or about 0.55% of the population) who belong to another church (not listed on the census), 220 (or about 7.57% of the population) belong to no church, are agnostic or atheist, and 94 individuals (or about 3.23% of the population) did not answer the question.

== Education ==
The entire Swiss population is generally well educated. In Gachnang about 79.5% of the population (between age 25-64) have completed either non-mandatory upper secondary education or additional higher education (either university or a Fachhochschule). Gachnang is home to the Gachnang primary school district.

In the 2008/2009 school year there are 383 students. There are 87 children in the kindergarten, and the average class size is 21.75 kindergartners. Of the children in kindergarten, 50 or 57.5% are female, 6 or 6.9% are not Swiss citizens and 8 or 9.2% do not speak German natively. The lower and upper primary levels begin at about age 5-6 and lasts for 6 years. There are 154 children in who are at the lower primary level and 142 children in the upper primary level. The average class size in the primary school is 21.14 students. At the lower primary level, there are 75 children or 48.7% of the total population who are female, 13 or 8.4% are not Swiss citizens and 12 or 7.8% do not speak German natively. In the upper primary level, there are 72 or 50.7% who are female, 10 or 7.0% are not Swiss citizens and 6 or 4.2% do not speak German natively.

== Transport ==
Gachnang-Islikon railway station is a stop of the Zurich S-Bahn on services S24 and S30.
