= Gerlikon =

Village in Thurgau, Switzerland

- Former municipality
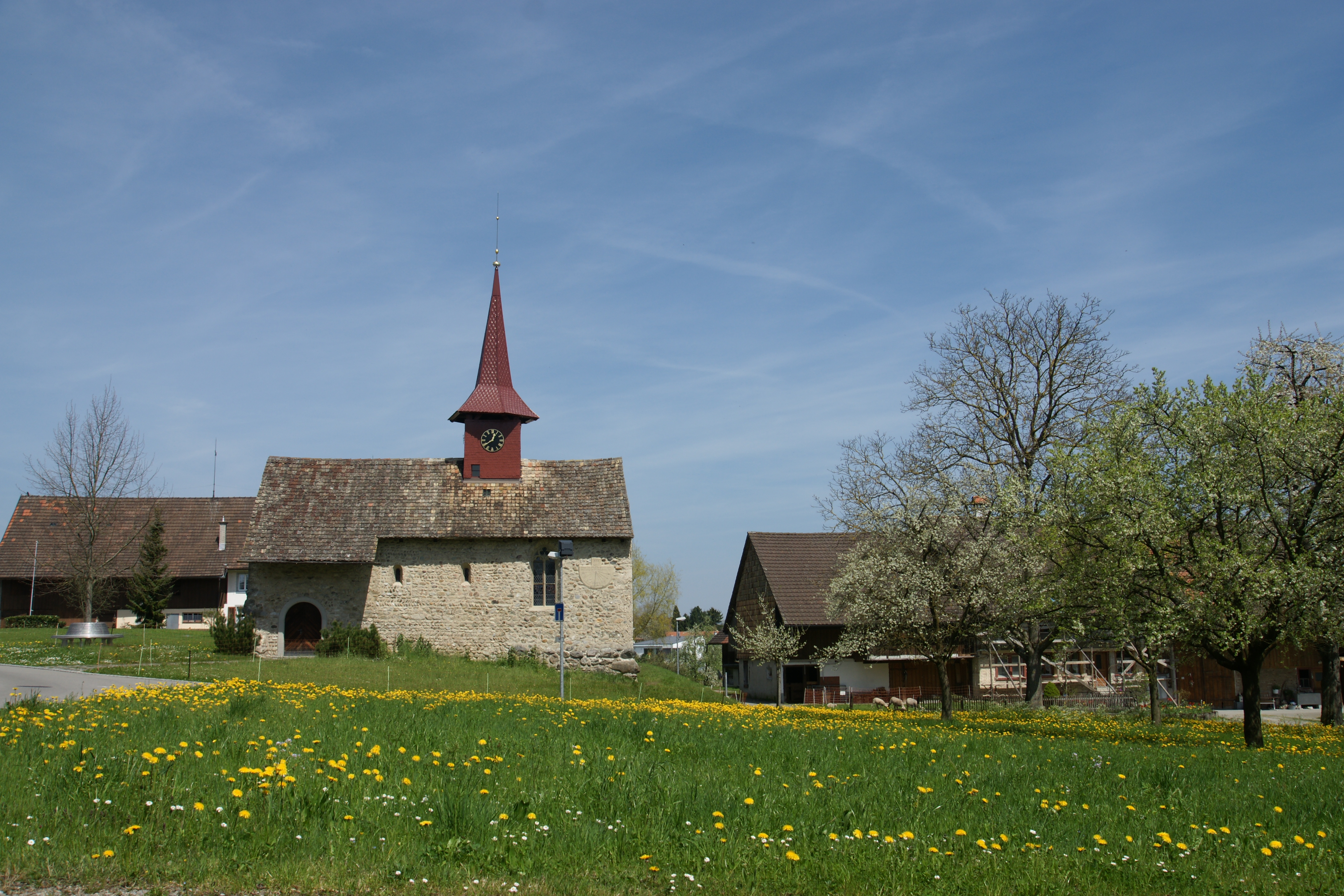

- Coat of arms
- Location of Gerlikon
- Location within Switzerland Location within Canton of Thurgau
- Coordinates: 47.537°N 8.877°E
- Country: Switzerland
- Canton: Thurgau
- Municipality: Frauenfeld

Population (1990)
  - Total: 373
- Time zone: UTC+01:00 (CET)
  - Summer (DST): UTC+02:00 (CEST)
- ISO 3166 code: CH-TG
- Website

Gerlikon is a former Ortsgemeinde (local commune) in the canton of Thurgau, Switzerland. It belonged to the Munizipalgemeinde (municipal commune) of Gachnang and has been part of the municipality of Frauenfeld since 1998. It lies on a hill south-west of Frauenfeld.

== History ==
Gerlikon is first mentioned in 1248 as Gerlichoven. Besides the village of Gerlikon, the community included the farmsteads of Teuschen (owned by the Abbey of Saint Gall in 1269, later by Feldbach), Hungersbühl (owned by Reichenau Abbey in 1308, later by Tänikon) and Bewangen (Reichenau in 1357). The von Gerlikon family, ministeriales of Reichenau, lived in Gerlikon and reached its peak in the second half of the 13th century. Around 1300 most of the family's property passed to Feldbach Abbey and a few properties to Töss Monastery. The low jurisdiction passed to the town court of Frauenfeld.

The chapel of St. George (first mentioned in 1429) was built in the first half of the 13th century, probably in connection with the legend of the pious Heinrich Pfrintz. Gerlikon belonged to the parish of Gachnang but had its own church property, which was dissolved in 1874 in favor of building a new schoolhouse. From then on the chapel served as a fire station. After its renovation was completed in 1948, Reformed services were again held there regularly.

Since the 1970s Gerlikon, until then a farming village, has been developing into a residential community with much building activity (the new neighborhoods of Weberlis Rebberg and Oberi Breiti).

The population was 231 in 1870, 215 in 1900, 201 in 1950 and 373 in 1990.

== Bibliography ==
- Die Kunstdenkmäler des Kantons Thurgau, vol. 1, 1950, pp. 206–214
