= Feldbach Abbey =

Former Cistercian abbey in Thurgau, Switzerland

- Kloster Feldbach
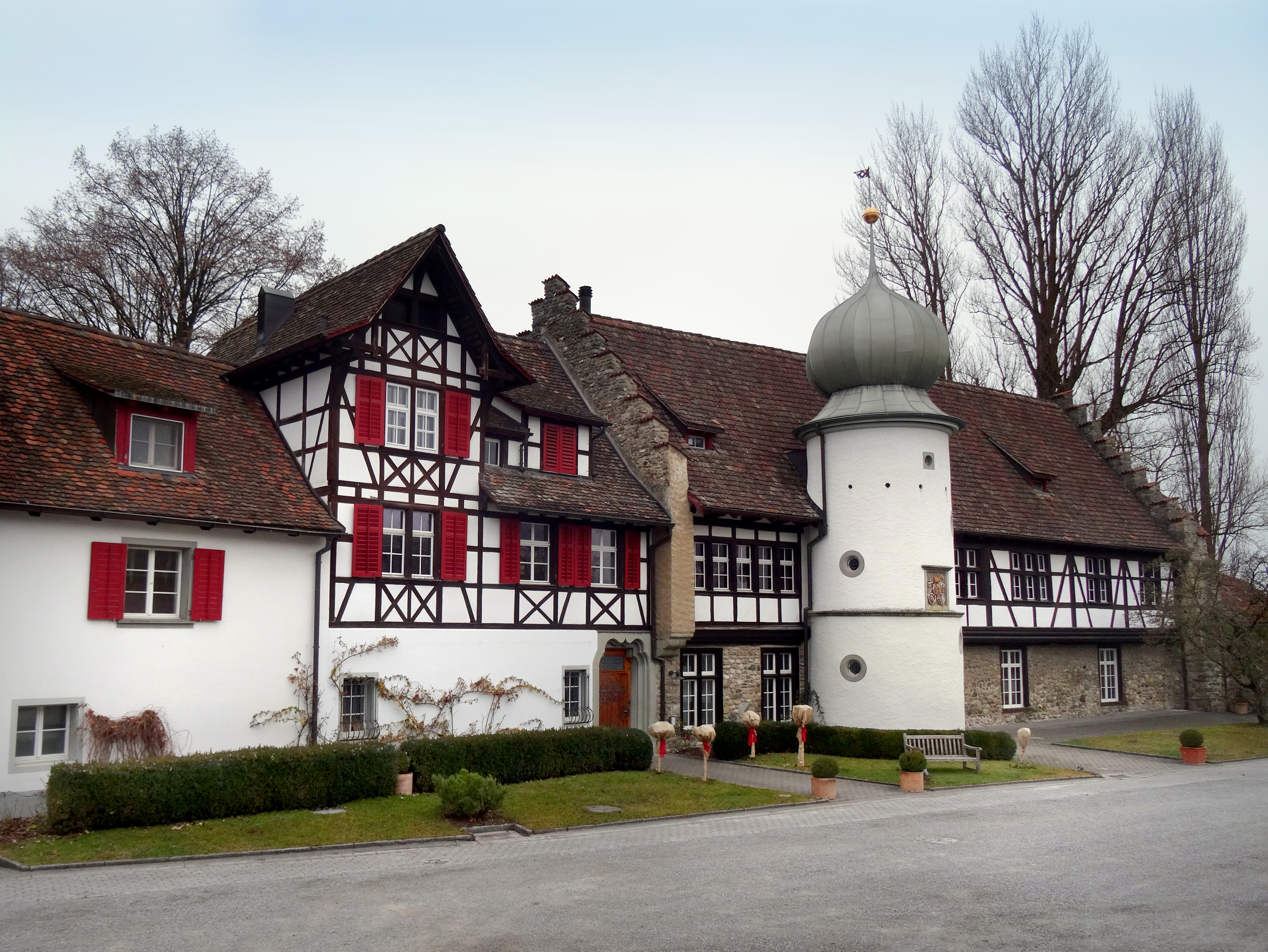

Religion
- Affiliation: Catholic Church
- Rite: Latin
- Ecclesiastical or organizational status: Dissolved (1848)

Location
- Location: Steckborn, Thurgau, Switzerland
- Interactive map of Feldbach Abbey

Architecture
- Founder: In ponte community of Constanz
- Completed: 1253/1254

Feldbach abbey was a former Cistercian abbey of nuns in the municipality of Steckborn, Thurgau, Switzerland.

It belonged to the Diocese of Constance until 1814, and then to the Diocese of Basel from 1828. Founded in 1253/1254, the convent is first mentioned in 1256 as monasterium in Velpach. It was placed under the spiritual direction of the abbot of Salem in 1260/1262, and of the abbot of Wettingen from 1603. It was suppressed in 1848.

== Foundation and medieval period ==
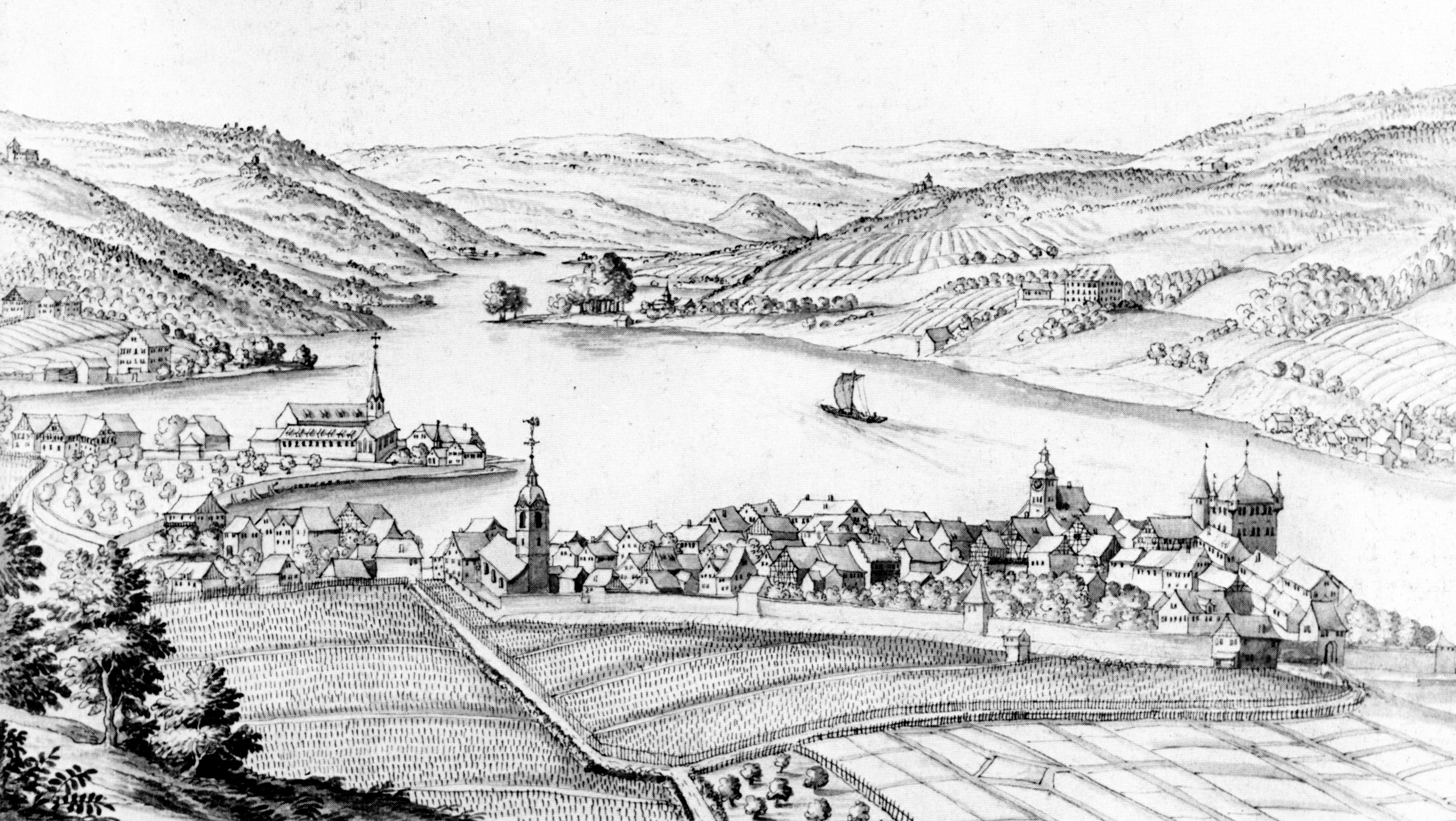
The town of Steckborn with the Cistercian Abbey of Feldbach (center left) – 18th century

In 1252, the in ponte community, a group of non-regular nuns from Konstanz, bought Feldbach Castle on the shore of the lower Lake Constance, together with the right of patronage and the endowment of its chapel. The seller was Kuno of Feldbach, who transferred everything with the approval of his overlords, the lords of Klingen. The nuns settled there in 1253/1254 with episcopal permission to found a convent, which was incorporated into the Cistercian Order in 1260/1262.

The convent grew rapidly thanks to the favor of the lords of Klingen and Klingenberg. Purchases and donations soon gave it considerable property in the surrounding area. In 1282, Feldbach received the advocacy and the right of patronage of Hemmenhofen in Baden. Having formed a lower jurisdiction, the convent was counted among the justiciary lords of Thurgau. A letter of indulgence issued in 1327 is probably connected with the construction of the convent's early Gothic church. In the Middle Ages, the nuns came from burgher families, mainly from Konstanz, and from the lower nobility of the Lake Konstanz region. The presence of lay sisters is attested until 1333.

== Reformation and reorganization ==
In 1460, sovereignty over the Landgraviate of Thurgau passed to the Confederates. At the Reformation, Abbess Barbara and about half of the nuns kept the old faith. In 1549, the Catholic cantons installed Afra Schmid, until then prioress of Magdenau, at the head of the convent, which had become heavily indebted, badly managed, and emptied of nuns. The abbess succeeded in reorganizing the administration and brought in young women whom she trained in community life and in plainchant.

The reform continued in the 17th century. By 1720, the majority of the religious (22 nuns and 8 lay sisters) came from Thurgau, the Catholic cantons, Swabia, or Tyrol. The church was renovated in 1764.

== Suppression and later use ==
The abbess and sisters moved to Tänikon in 1848, to Mammern in 1853, and finally to Mariastern-Gwiggen in Vorarlberg between 1861 and 1864. The conventual buildings reverted to the municipality of Steckborn. From 1865 they were used for industrial purposes, until a fire destroyed them in 1895, sparing only part of what was still called "the old lakeside convent" and a few outbuildings.

The old monastery has been preserved and now serves as part of a hotel.

== Bibliography ==
- Helvetia Sacra, III/3, pp. 634–664.
- Zisterzienserbauten in der Schweiz, vol. 1, 1990, pp. 83–110.
- Die Kunstdenkmäler des Kantons Thurgau, vol. 6, 2001, pp. 383–403.
