= Wittenwil =

Coordinates: 47.503°N 8.9226°E

Wittenwil is a village and former municipality in the district of Frauenfeld in the canton of Thurgau, Switzerland.

In 1996 the municipality was incorporated and divided into the municipalities Aadorf and Wängi.
