= Aawangen =

Village in the canton of Thurgau, Switzerland

Coordinates: 47°30′42.54″N 8°53′58.68″E

Aawangen is a village and former municipality in the district of Frauenfeld in the canton of Thurgau, Switzerland.

It was probably first recorded in 844 as Oninwanc.

The municipality also contained the villages Bürg, Friedtal, Huzenwil, Moos and Häuslenen. It had 473 inhabitants in 1850, which increased to 400 in 1870, 656 in 1960 and 1051 in 1990.

In 1996 the municipality was incorporated into the larger, neighboring municipality Aadorf.
