= Caroline Farner =

Swiss doctor and activist (1842-1913)

- Born: 1842; Guntershausen bei Aadorf
- Died: 1913 (aged 70–71)
- Occupation: doctor

Caroline Farner (1842–1913) is notable for being the second female Swiss doctor as well as a campaigner for the Swiss women's movement.

== Early life ==
Born and raised in Guntershausen bei Aadorf, she was the seventh and youngest children of a farmer and his wife, who was the main provider of health care for the surrounding area. After her mother's death when she was 15, Farner was brought up by her elder sister. After leaving school, she worked as a governess in Scotland for eight years.

== Public life ==
After nursing several family members through illness, she became disillusioned with her previous choice of career. Deciding instead on medicine, she first gained the necessary school-leaving certificate (teaching herself Latin and mathematics in record time) before entering Zurich University in 1871. In 1877 she completed her medical degree, only the second Swiss woman to do so, and continued her training in Vienna, Paris and Budapest before returning to Zurich to open a practice. During the thirty-six years it operated, the practice grew to be one of the biggest in the city and, despite offering free service to the poor, Farner had amassed a not insignificant fortune.

Beyond the medical world, Farner put her considerable talent in public speaking to good use in the leading role she played in the Swiss women's movement. Under her leadership, the Swiss Worker's Union secured a placement centre for female domestic servants, a women's clinic and a sanatorium for women in Urnasch (in 1907 she donated this to the city of Zurich for use as a holiday camp). In 1892, Farner and her partner Anna Pfrunder were arrested for embezzling of 60000 Francs of ward money, an erroneous charge brought about by opponents of the women's movement scared of her success. Despite no evidence, Farner and Pfrunder were imprisoned for seven weeks in solitary confinement before eventual acquittal following a drawn-out investigation by one General Judge Wittelsbach. Their release garnered support for their cause from other women's movements Europe-wide and led to Meta von Salis-Marschlins in an editorial in the commemorative issue of Philanthropin calling for universal suffrage, as only this could prevent such an injustice happening again and “that women have to be employed in government, court, police, prison authorities, in short, wherever women’s interest are concerned.” Returning to work after the court case and she continued her practice until her death in 1913. Following the death of Pfrunder in 1925, their house was gifted to the Zurich section of the Lyceum Club. Furthermore, they established the Anna-Carolina Foundation to support female students, an organisation that continues to award scholarships to this day. Her life has also become the subject of a novel by Rosemarie Keller entitled Ich bereue nicht einen meiner Schritte. Leben und Prozess der Ärztin Caroline Farner (or I do not Regret Any of my Actions: the Life and Trial of Doctor Caroline Farner.)

== Private life ==
Farner lived with Anna Pfrunder for thirty-two years, first in Pfrunder's parents' house and then, following friction, in a house of their own; the Villa Ehrenberg, Rämistrasse 26 in Zurich. Pfrunder brought her niece with her when she moved to Villa Ehrenberg and it was the prolonged legal battle to gain guardianship of her nephew as well that brought the couple to the attention of Judge Wittelsbach. In the end, the guardianship was refused on the grounds that "the office for orphans cannot have any faith that those two women can give the two children a proper upbringing" after Pfrunder "had estranged herself from her father and mother, both infirm and frail, to cuddle up with a strange person and to live with this person." Despite the undoubted strains the many trials and the eventual imprisonment they suffered, the couple remained companions for life, still together when Farner died in 1913.
