= Farner (automobile) =

Defunct American motor vehicle manufacturer

The Farner was an automobile manufactured in the United States of America at Streator, Illinois by OM Farner between 1922 and 1923. The Farner Model A had a 115-inch wheelbase, a tourer body, and had a Falls XP9000 six-cylinder engine, and sold for $1195.

In 1923 Farner reduced the price of the Model A to $1095 in an attempt to increase sales, but the Farner Motor Car Company was out of business by the end of the year.

OM Farner left Streator and his family at the end of 1923, and spent the next fifteen years in Lowell, Massachusetts, until returning to Streator in 1938. He never explained what he had been doing in those fifteen years.
