= Ettenhausen =

Coordinates: 47.476339°N 8.898484°E

Ettenhausen is a village and former municipality in the district of Frauenfeld in the canton of Thurgau, Switzerland.

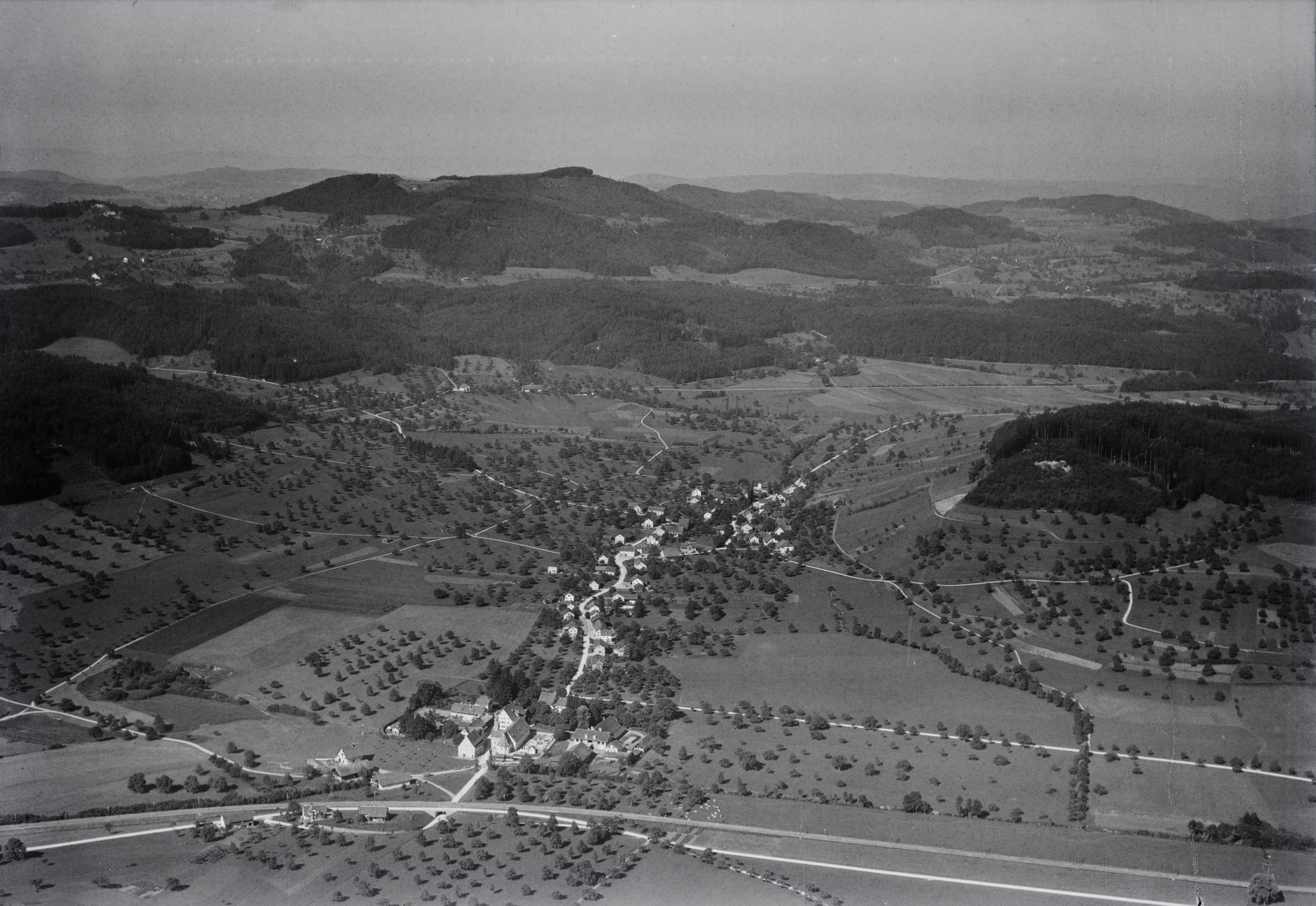
Aerial view from 800 m by Walter Mittelholzer (1927)

It was first recorded in 1278 as Oetenhusen.

The municipality also contained the village Iltishausen. It had 321 inhabitants in 1850, which increased to 395 in 1950 and 941 in 1990.

In 1996 the municipality was incorporated into the larger, neighboring municipality Aadorf.
