= Weisthümer =

Four volume book collection

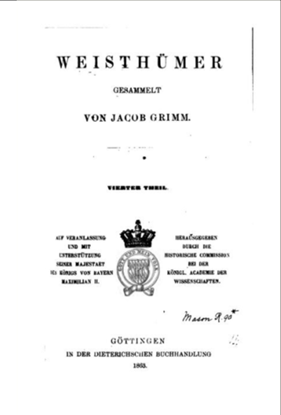
- Author: Jacob Grimm
- Language: German
- Subject: Germanic law
- Publisher: Göttingen
- Publication date: 1840
- Publication place: Germany

Weisthümer is a collection of partially oral legal traditions from rural German-speaking Europe by Jacob Grimm, published in four volumes (1840–1863), intended for use in research into Germanic law.

The German term Weisthum (post-1901 spelling Weistum) in the sense of "historical legal text" originates in the region of the middle Rhine and the Moselle. In southern Germany, equivalent terms were Ehaft or Ehafttaiding, in the Alsace Dinghofrodel, in Switzerland Offnung, in Austria Banntaiding, and in Low German Willkür or Beliebung. Rural oral legal traditions are found primarily in the Alamannic and Austro-Bavarian regions of German-speaking Europe. According to the more recent research, Weistum texts "are to be addressed as a standardized artefact intended for a circumscribed circle of legitimate or addressed recipients, namely the 'lordship' and the peasant landed gentry and courtly class."

== See also ==
- Germanic law
- Landrecht (medieval)
- Landsgemeinde
- Lögsögumaður
- Medieval Scandinavian law
- Vehmic court
