= Grand Council of Thurgau =

Grand Council of Thurgau Grosser Rat

Type
- Type: Unicameral

Structure
- Seats: 130
- Political groups: SVP (42); The Centre (21); SP (18); FDP (17); Greens (13); EDU (6); EVP (6); GLP (6); Aufrecht (1)

Elections
- Voting system: Party-list proportional representation
- Last election: 7 April 2024

Meeting place
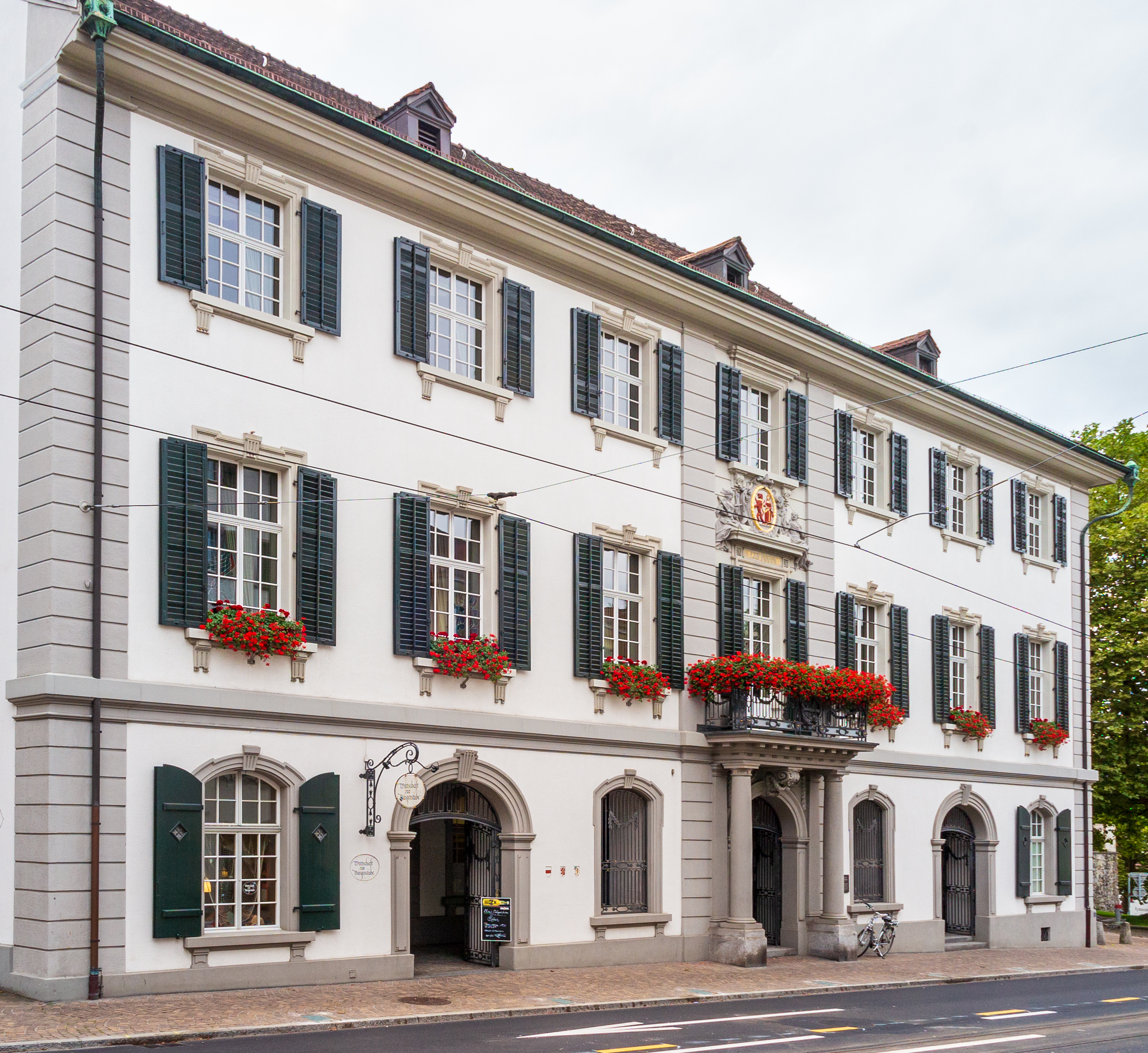
- Frauenfeld Town House, Frauenfeld
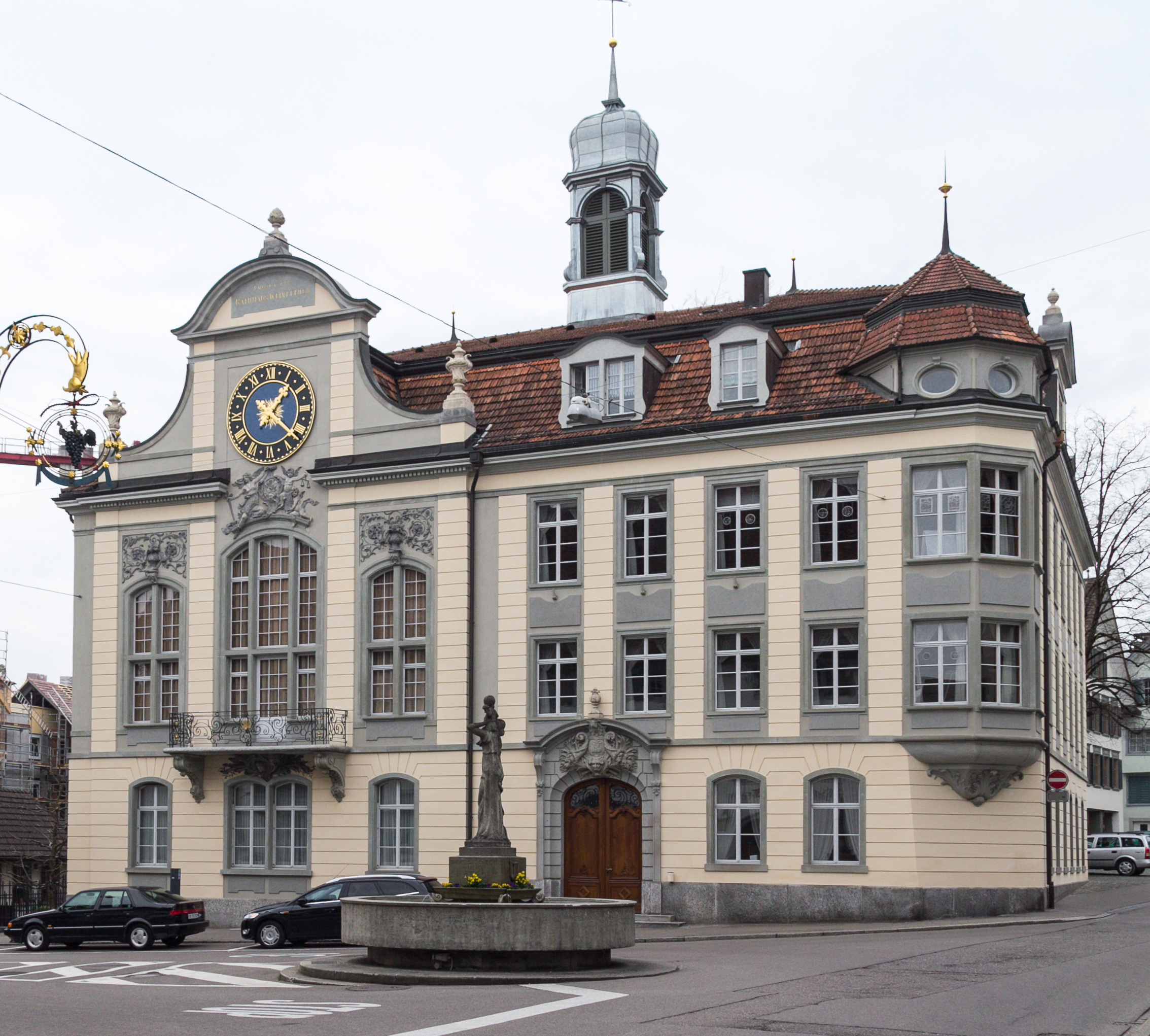
- Weinfelden Town House, Weinfelden

Website
- https://parlament.tg.ch/

The Grand Council of Thurgau (German: Grosser Rat) is the legislature of the canton of Thurgau, in Switzerland. Thurgau has a unicameral legislature. The Grand Council has 130 seats, with members elected every four years.

The council has the unique feature in Switzerland of convening in two different locations: the town hall of Frauenfeld in the summer and that of Weinfelden in the winter.

== History ==
The Grand Council was created in 1803 by the Act of Mediation, which established Thurgau as a Swiss canton. It then counted 100 members who served five-year terms. The council met for the first time on 14 April 1803 at the town hall of Frauenfeld.

The cantonal constitution of 1831 introduced a system of two annual sessions, one taking place in Frauenfeld in the winter and the other in Weinfelden in the summer. In 1869, a new cantonal constitution made the number of seats dependent on the size of the population and shortened the parliamentary term to three years.

In 1966, the duration of the legislature was increased to four years. After the introduction of women's suffrage in 1971, the number of seats in the council was fixed at 130. The Thurgau constitution of 1987, which came into force in 1990, switched the meeting places of the council, which now meets in Weinfelden in the winter and in Frauenfeld in the summer.

== Elections ==
The 130 members of the Grand Council of Thurgau are elected by proportional representation by district, the canton being divided into five districts (Arbon, Frauenfeld, Kreuzlingen, Münchwilen and Weinfelden). Cantonal elections are always held in the spring, after the elections to the Federal Assembly.

Each voter has as many votes as there are seats to be filled in the district in which they are registered to vote. The seat count per district is determined by the Council of State based on the resident population. For the elections of 15 March 2020, the number of seats per district was 27 for Arbon, 32 for Frauenfeld, 23 for Kreuzlingen, 22 for Münwilen and 26 for Weinfelden.
