= SIA Abrasives =

Swiss abrasives manufacturer

- Formerly: Zwicky-Schiess, Naxos-Schmirgelwerk; Schweizer Schmirgel- & Schleifindustrie
- Type: Joint-stock company
- Industry: Abrasives
- Founded: 1875 in Frauenfeld, Switzerland
- Founder: Balthasar Merk
- Fate: Acquired by Bosch (2008)
- Headquarters: Frauenfeld, Switzerland
- Products: Abrasives, sanding products
- Number of employees: 1,100 (2005)
- Parent: Robert Bosch GmbH (from 2008)

SIA Abrasives (SIA Abrasives Industries AG), formerly the Schweizer Schmirgel- & Schleifindustrie, is a Swiss abrasives manufacturer based in Frauenfeld. Originating in 1875, it developed after 1945 into an international company and has been part of Bosch since 2008.

== History ==
The chemist Balthasar Merk set up a laboratory in Frauenfeld in 1875 in which he produced ink and abrasives, among other things. Albert Zwicky-Schiess became his partner in 1900, and Merk withdrew in 1901. Zwicky and a new partner then specialized production by making flexible sanding products (1902–1905).

With the financial support of Johann Conrad Alder, the future chairman of the board, Zwicky ran the company from 1905. In 1914 he converted Zwicky-Schiess, Naxos-Schmirgelwerk into a joint-stock company under the name Schweizer Schmirgel- & Schleifindustrie. Albert Zwicky-Werling took over its management in 1934, together with Hans Herbst.

The firm expanded from 1945 through the opening of branches on every continent, reaching turnover of 3.5 million francs and 172 employees in 1950. It rationalized its production and built numerous factories in Switzerland and abroad. The management acquired the majority of the share capital in 1997.

The company became SIA Abrasives Industries AG in 1998 and was listed on the stock exchange in 1999. From 2002 turnover regularly exceeded 240 million francs (261.4 million in 2005), with 1,100 employees. Bosch took over the company at the end of 2008 and had a new manufacturing unit built in Frauenfeld in 2009–2010.

== Bibliography ==
- Siarama, 1971–1981 (KBTG)
- E. Isler, Die Geschichte der SIA und ihrer Vorläufer, 1976
- Sia dialog, 1986–1988 (KBTG)
- Thurgauer Zeitung, 30 December 2008; 1 October 2009
