= Protestant refugees in Switzerland =

Refugee group in 16th to 18th centuries

Protestant refugees in Switzerland were religious migrants who fled to the Reformed cantons of Switzerland as well as to the Republic of Geneva between the 16th and 18th centuries due to persecution in their home countries. The confessional division of Europe in the 16th century led Protestant refugees, primarily Reformed but also Lutheran and Anglican, to seek refuge in Swiss territories from various countries including France, Italy, Germany, England, Hungary, and Spain, where their worship and access to civil and political offices were prohibited.

This migration flow, though of variable intensity, continued uninterrupted throughout the Ancien Régime and experienced two major peaks: the first following the Protestant Reformation and the St. Bartholomew's Day Massacre in 1572 (known as the first Refuge), and the second triggered by the Revocation of the Edict of Nantes in 1685 and preceding measures (the second or great Refuge).

== First Refuge ==
In the 16th century, several Spanish Reformed refugees, including Marcos Pérez and Casiodore de Reyna, a Bible translator, found refuge in Basel. The Augsburg Interim (1548) saw the establishment of German Protestants in the Canton of Bern, while the reign of Mary Tudor (1553-1558) led to the founding of British communities in Geneva (including John Knox), Aarau, and Vevey.

The first major collective emigration was that of the French following the Affair of the Placards (1534) and the reversal of royal policy toward Protestants, alongside Italians from Lucca, Genoa, Cremona, and Milan fleeing the Inquisition reestablished in 1542. The members of the Reformed community of Locarno left the city in 1555.

Romandy, the French-speaking territories of present day Switzerland, where several sectors of the textile industry had not yet established guild regulations and where the adoption of the Reformation created strong demand for French-speaking preachers, proved open to refugees. Under Calvin's influence, and despite opposition, Geneva granted residency to nearly 8,000 refugees between 1549 and 1587. Approximately 3,000 of them settled permanently, comprising 30% of Geneva's population. Among them were several families from Lucca who established themselves, such as the Burlamaqui, Diodati, Micheli, and Calandrini families. Dozens of Huguenot printers made the city a center for publishing Bibles and "Huguenot psalters".

The Bernese government encouraged Vaud localities to open citizenship more broadly to refugees and created scholarships for them at the Academy of Lausanne. In Zurich, where refugees from Valtellina and the Grisons mixed with those from the Reformed community of Locarno, the authorities' welcoming policy was quickly undermined by the politically powerful guilds, who feared competition from refugee entrepreneurs in the textile sector. The same occurred in Basel, where the few families admitted to citizenship (Bernoulli, Legrand, Sarasin) developed activities complementary to those of the resident population, such as silk production or major commerce, as did the Orelli family in Zurich.

== Second Refuge ==
In the 17th century, after several smaller migration waves (notably following the Thirty Years' War and, from the 1660s, measures taken against Huguenots by Louis XIV), the Revocation of the Edict of Nantes (October 18, 1685) led approximately 150,000 Huguenots to flee France. An estimated 60,000 passed through Switzerland. They were joined in 1687—the year of greatest influx—by the Waldensians, and in 1703 by some 3,000 Protestants from the Principality of Orange occupied by Louis XIV. A lesser and sporadic flow, still poorly understood, continued into the 18th century, likely not ceasing until Louis XVI's edict of tolerance (1787).

Oscillating between solidarity and rejection but anticipating a massive influx, the Reformed cantons adopted, shortly before the Revocation, a distribution key for caring for refugees in need (Bern: 50%, Zurich: 30%, Basel: 12%, Schaffhausen: 8%) and adapted their institutions (such as Refugee Chambers). Communities and individuals were solicited, even compelled, to participate in reception (particularly lodging and food). However, the establishment of colonies was not favored as it had been in other countries such as Brandenburg. This was explained by the poor economic conditions of the late 17th century, territorial constraints, the need to accommodate Catholic cantons, and pressure exerted by France, particularly on Geneva.

The majority of refugees had to leave Switzerland for Germany following the expulsion policy implemented by the Reformed cantons at the Diet of Baden in September 1693, made effective with the "great departure" of spring 1699. It is generally estimated that about 20,000 Huguenots were able to settle permanently. To the officially invoked religious motives was added an economic calculation: encouraging Huguenot manufacturing enterprises was part of developing mercantilism and authorities' fight against poverty. Thus it was in a little-industrialized canton, Bern, that most refugees could settle, with the sovereign letting communities in Romandy establish lists of people they intended to keep, while encouraging openness.

Between 1680 and 1720, more than 800 heads of families obtained legal status ranging from citizenship (approximately 60), granted sparingly by communities, to residency, either perpetual (approximately 400) or "tolerated" (approximately 230). The rest received citizenship without political rights ("assoufertée"), which was specifically introduced for Protestant religious refugees. The Huguenots quickly created a framework for their collective life through the establishment of "bourses françaises" (also called directions françaises and corporations françaises), modeled on consistories, supported by authorities who thus found themselves relieved of assistance and social control tasks.

Financed by public subsidies, donations, bequests, and temple collections, the bourses françaises, including those of Geneva and Basel dating to the 16th century, provided temporary relief and medical assistance. True "Huguenot communes" in the Bernese case, they also issued marriage authorizations to their members and from 1755 could collect an entry tax. They persisted in certain places until the 19th century (that of Yverdon still existed in the early 21st century), not without jurisdictional conflicts with municipal instances. That of Lausanne counted 1,700 members in the mid-18th century (for about 8,000 inhabitants); it included both descendants of Huguenots and new arrivals of the 18th century.

== Influence of refugees ==
Through several prominent figures—Calvin and Theodore Beza—and through lasting relationships established between host churches and the clandestine Protestant church of France or those of the Palatinate, Hungary, and other Reformed minorities in Europe, the refugees left their mark on the history of Protestantism in Switzerland. Economically, the first Refuge played a role especially in the development of export textile industry (in Zurich, for example, with the Orelli family). As initiator of its pre-capitalist organization, it was at the origin of the formation of international networks, of which the career of the Lucchese François Turrettini, head of the Grande Boutique of Geneva, is an eloquent example.

In the second Refuge, this international aspect proved even more important given the unprecedented scattering of families who would be at the origin of the "Huguenot international": based on close relationships reinforced by matrimonial alliances between Swiss bankers of Huguenot origin and their compatriots remaining in France or refugees in other countries, this network contributed to the success of printed cotton (indienne) production. The presence of refugees, expanding consumption and production of luxury objects, further stimulated the development of artisanal activities such as goldsmithing and enamel painting.

The arrival of Huguenots coincided with the apogee of the French cultural model, to whose diffusion they largely contributed. In Bern, where the Huguenot community had its church since 1623, and in Basel, their worship was attended by the local bourgeoisie, eager to perfect their knowledge of the French language. New French churches, closely controlled by local clergy, emerged in Aarau, St. Gallen, Schaffhausen, Winterthur, and Zurich. French nobility fashion spread, particularly in French-speaking Switzerland, where new customs appeared, such as coffeehouses and shops.

Several descendants of refugees launched newspapers and magazines, including the Bibliothèque italique, as well as major editorial enterprises like the Encyclopédie œconomique, and played a role as cultural intermediaries within the Republic of Letters, exemplified by Firmin Abauzit and Jean Barbeyrac. In these cases, as in the diffusion in the 18th century of rational and liberal Christianity promoted by descendants of the first Refuge—who represented a quarter of Geneva's pastoral body—the respective roles of their Huguenot ancestry, nationality, or the spirit of the times remain difficult to determine.

== Historiography ==
The historiography of the Refuges has its roots in a particular moment: the affirmation of a Huguenot identity in France, erected as a republican model by Jules Michelet. It was in this context that Johann Kaspar Mörikofer provided, with his History of Reformation Refugees in Switzerland, a first synthesis (1876, French translation 1878), whose hagiographic vision of "refugees of faith," characteristic of 19th and early 20th-century historiography, exercised lasting influence. It emphasized the generosity displayed toward refugees as well as their contribution to their host societies.

Since the postwar period, the event has been gradually demythologized. Walter Bodmer had an important impact in this regard by analyzing the influence of refugees on Switzerland's proto-industrial development, revealing both reception policies strongly determined by economic considerations and the numerous obstacles and failures encountered by nascent enterprises, thus laying the groundwork for future studies, particularly stimulated by the commemoration of the tricentenary of the Revocation. The Swiss Association for the History of the Huguenot Refuge, which publishes a collection of sources and studies, was created in the aftermath (1986).

These researches have clarified various aspects, such as refugees' place in the local economy, where their driving role has been relativized, their sometimes difficult contacts with the population, and the attitude marked by political realism of authorities toward them, also calling into question the exclusively confessional character of the migration. The study of a "refuge" unified by faith has now given way to that of a migration, subject to numerous fractures and presenting all the traits of a "diaspora".

== Bibliography ==
- Meyrat, W. Die Unterstützung der Glaubensgenossen im Ausland durch die reformierten Orte im 17. und 18. Jahrhundert, 1941
- Bodmer, W. Der Einfluss der Refugianteneinwanderung von 1550-1700 auf die schweizerische Wirtschaft, 1946
- Kingdon, R.M. Geneva and the Coming of the Wars of Religion in France, 1555-1563, 1956 (2nd ed. 2007)
- Gacond, L. "Bibliogr. du Refuge huguenot en Suisse après la Révocation de l'édit de Nantes", in RSH, 36, 1986, 368-391
- Mottu-Weber, L. Economie et Refuge à Genève au siècle de la Réforme, 1987
- Ducommun, M.-J., Quadroni, D. Le Refuge protestant dans le Pays de Vaud (fin XVIIe-début XVIIIe s.), 1991
- Küng, M. Die bernische Asyl- und Flüchtlingspolitik am Ende des 17. Jahrhunderts, 1993
- Mottu-Weber, L. "Genève et ses 'minorités': l'apport des réfugiés réformés français et italiens", in Il ruolo economico delle minoranze in Europa, secc. XIII-XVIII, ed. S. Cavaciocchi, 2000, 423-433
- Birnstiel, E., ed. La diaspora des huguenots, 2001
- Canevascini, S., Bianconi, P. L'esilio dei protestanti locarnesi, 2005
