= Otto Zeinenger =

Reformation theologian (1513–1576)

Otto Zeinenger (1513–1576) was an obscure yet influential theologian of the early Reformation.

Born in Germany and ordained in the Catholic Church, he moved to Geneva in his early twenties. Here he came under the sway of Protestant reformer John Calvin, whose devoted student he became. Zeinenger published a number of commentaries on Calvin's Institutes before Calvin and his followers were forced to leave Geneva in 1538. From this point until Calvin's triumphant return to Geneva in 1541, Zeinenger's whereabouts are unknown. There is some evidence to suggest he traveled to the Languedoc region of southern France, although some have speculated that he traveled as far as Greece or possibly Bulgaria.

Zeinenger returned to Geneva sometime around 1541 and began preaching to the city's growing Protestant community. Over the course of the next decade, however, he appears to have had a falling-out with Calvin. In the end he was stripped of his ministerial duties, although he continued to write until his death and his unpublished sermons were circulated in dissident Protestant circles for many years.

Although Zeinenger's early theological writings are very close to the natural theology of Jean Calvin, his later writings are less easy to categorize. At times he maintains the strict Calvinist line, while at others he appears to veer off along more dualist or Manichaean avenues. These unorthodox adventures are thought by many to explain the rift that grew up between Calvin and his young disciple.

However, recent scholarship on Zeinenger's work has argued that the so-called "rift" between Calvin and Zeinenger had less to do with theology and more to do with oratory style. It has been suggested that Zeinenger's often excessive use of rhetorical manipulation offended Calvin's belief that the truth of the Christian faith should be accessible through reason and faith alone. Zeinenger, on the other hand, is reputed (see Simon of Beziers' "Chronicles of Geneva", pp. 217–18) to have said that "lost souls are sometimes more easily directed through misdirection.") Some, including Simon of Beziers, assert that Zeinenger was willing to stoop to "swindling" ("Chronicles of Geneva", pp. 15–19) his audience into accepting Christian doctrine.

Most of the authors who dispute the theory of sharp theological split between Calvin and Zeinenger also reject the notion that Zeinenger ever left Switzerland to travel to Bulgaria, Greece, or southern France. The details of Zeinenger's life during this period are notoriously fuzzy.

== See also ==
- Reformation in Switzerland
