= Ulrich Gasser =

Swiss composer

Ulrich Gasser (Frauenfeld, 19 April 1950) is a Swiss composer. After studying flute at Winterthur Conservatory he continued studies with flautist André Jaunet.

== Selected works ==
- Von der unerbittlichen Zufälligkeit des Todes Oratorio for 6 female voices, 6 male voices, 8 flutes and 6 sounding stones. Jecklin 1995
- 4 kleine Stücke (4 Little Pieces) for viola solo (1978)
- Steinstücke (Stone Pieces) for viola, piano, piano-string player and assistant (ad libitum) (1978)
- Und bräche nicht aus allen seinen Rändern aus wie ein Stern for viola and piano (1981–1984)
- Bel Air for viola and piano (2005)
- Sie verstanden seine Worte nicht, Station II from Kleine Passion am Stadtberg for viola and organ (2006)
