= List of mayors of Frauenfeld =

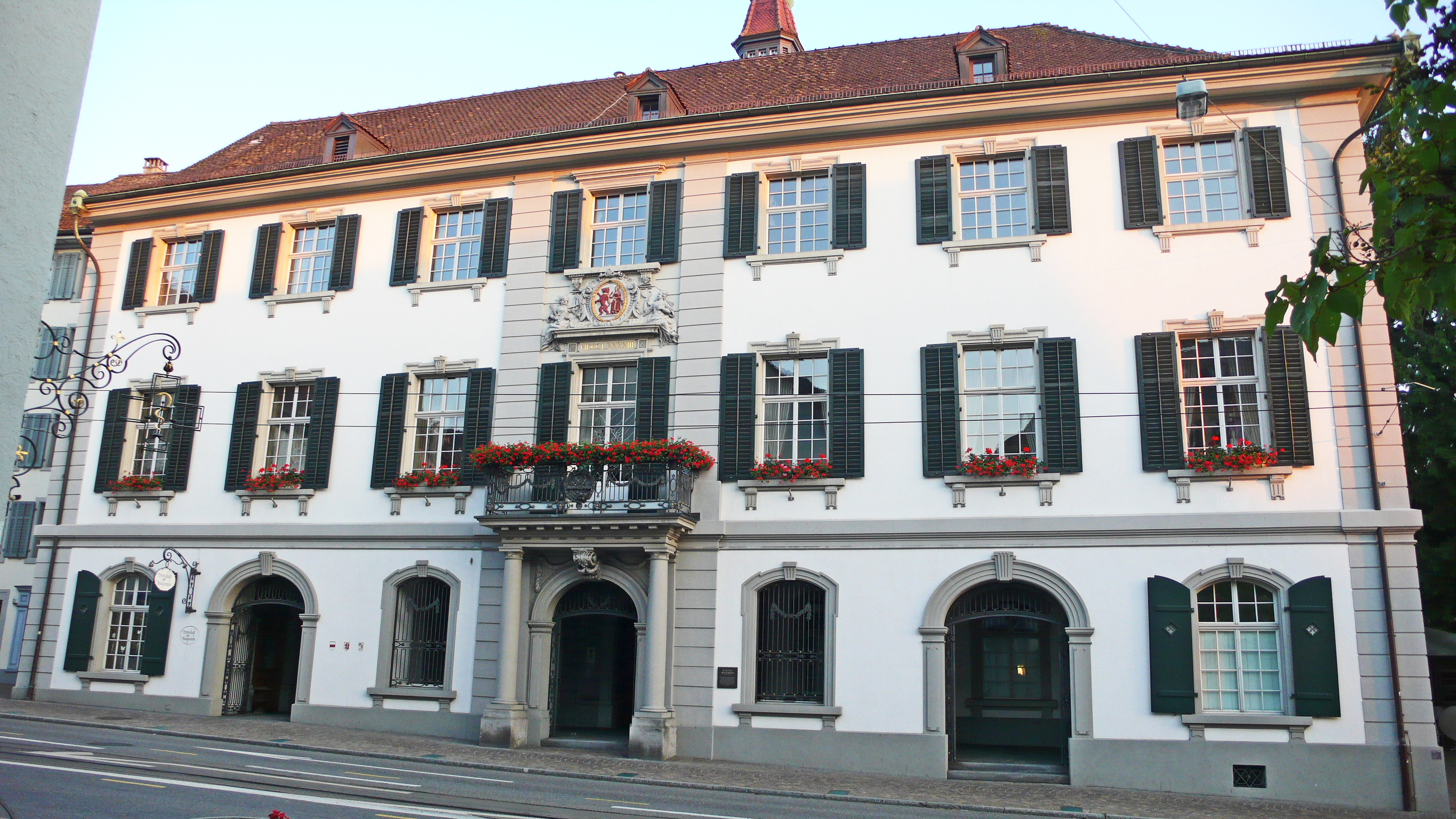
Rathaus Fraufeld

Coat of arms of Frauenfeld

This is a list of mayors of the city of Frauenfeld, Switzerland. Since 1946, the term Stadtammann is used to designate the mayor.

Mayor of Frauenfeld
Term	Mayor	Lifespan	Party	Notes
1898–1919	Julius Ruoff	(1850–1935)		
1919–1945	Karl Halter	(1878–1968)	FDP/PRD	
1946–1955	Otto Hermann	(1890–1965)	SPS/PSS	
1955–1970	Albert Bauer	(1911–1970)	SPS/PSS	
1970–1977	Max Rutishauser	(-2012)		
1977–2005	Hans Bachofner	(born 1939)	FDP/PRD	
2005–2015	Carlo Parolari	(born 1962)	FDP/PRD	
2015–present	Anders Stokholm	(born 1966)	FDP/PRD	
