= Reformation in Switzerland =

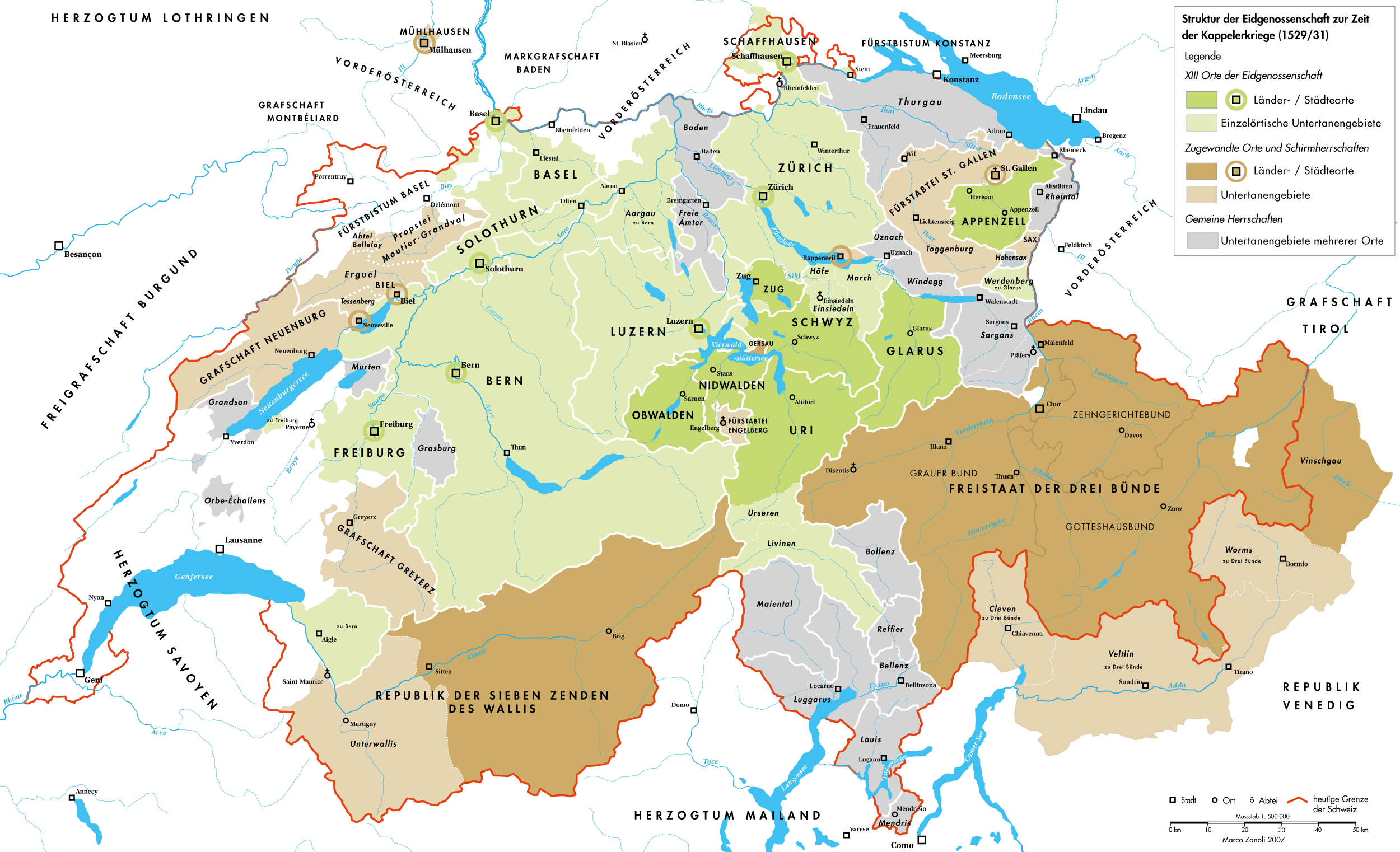
Map of the thirteen cantons of the Swiss Confederacy in 1530 (green) with their separate subject territories (light green), condominiums (grey) and associates (brown)

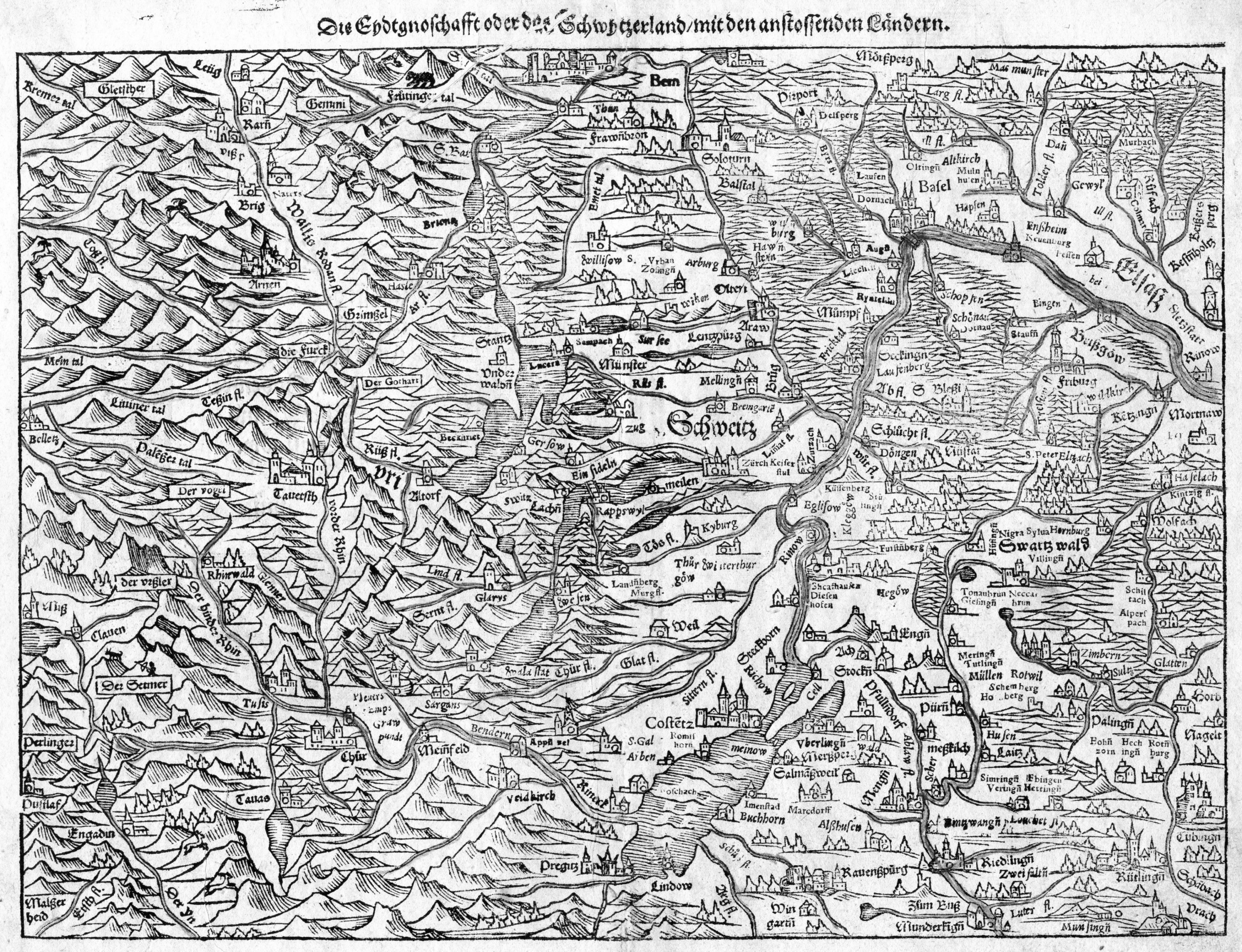
Map of the Swiss Confederacy by Sebastian Münster (c. 1550)

The Protestant Reformation in Switzerland was promoted initially by Huldrych Zwingli, who gained the support of the magistrate, Mark Reust, and the population of Zürich in the 1520s. It led to significant changes in civil life and state matters in Zürich and spread to several other cantons of the Old Swiss Confederacy. Seven cantons remained Catholic, however, which led to intercantonal wars known as the Wars of Kappel. After the victory of the Catholic cantons in 1531, they proceeded to institute Counter-Reformation policies in some regions. The schism and distrust between the Catholic and the Protestant cantons defined their interior politics and paralysed any common foreign policy until well into the 18th century.

Despite their religious differences and an exclusively Catholic defence alliance of the seven cantons (Goldener Bund), no other major armed conflicts directly between the cantons occurred. Soldiers from both sides fought in the French Wars of Religion.

During the Thirty Years' War, the thirteen cantons managed to maintain their neutrality, partly because all major powers in Europe depended on Swiss mercenaries and would not let Switzerland fall into the hands of one of their rivals. The Three Leagues (Drei Bünde) of the Grisons were not yet a member of the Confederacy but were involved in the war from 1620 onward, which led to their loss of the Valtellina from 1623 to 1639.

== Development of Protestantism ==
After the violent conflicts of the late 15th century, the Swiss cantons had had a generation of relative political stability. As part of their struggle for independence, they had already in the 15th century sought to limit the influence of the Church on their political sovereignty. Many monasteries had already come under secular supervision, and the administration of schools was in the hands of the cantons, although the teachers generally still were priests.

Nevertheless, many of the problems of the Church also existed in the Swiss Confederacy. Many a cleric, as well as the Church as a whole, enjoyed a luxurious lifestyle in stark contrast to the conditions of the large majority of the population; this luxury was financed by high church taxes and abundant sale of indulgences. Many priests were poorly educated, and spiritual Church doctrines were often disregarded. Many priests did not live in celibacy but in concubinage. The new reformatory ideas thus fell on fertile ground.

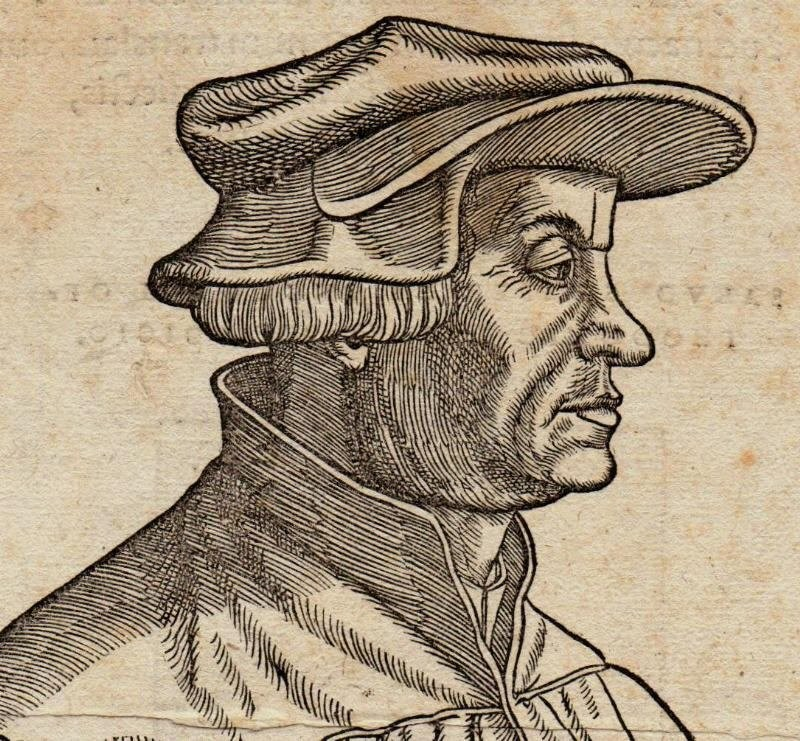
Huldrych Zwingli (woodcut by Hans Asper, 1531).

The main proponent of the Reformation in Switzerland was Huldrych Zwingli, whose actions during the Affair of the Sausages are now considered to be the start of the Reformation in Switzerland. His own studies, in the Renaissance humanist tradition, had led him to preach against injustices and hierarchies in the Church already in 1516 while he was still a priest in Einsiedeln. When he was called to Zürich, he expanded his criticism also onto political topics and in particular condemned the mercenary business. His ideas were received favorably, especially by entrepreneurs, businessmen, and the guilds. The first disputation of Zürich of 1523 was the breakthrough: the city council decided to implement his reformatory plans and to convert to Protestantism.

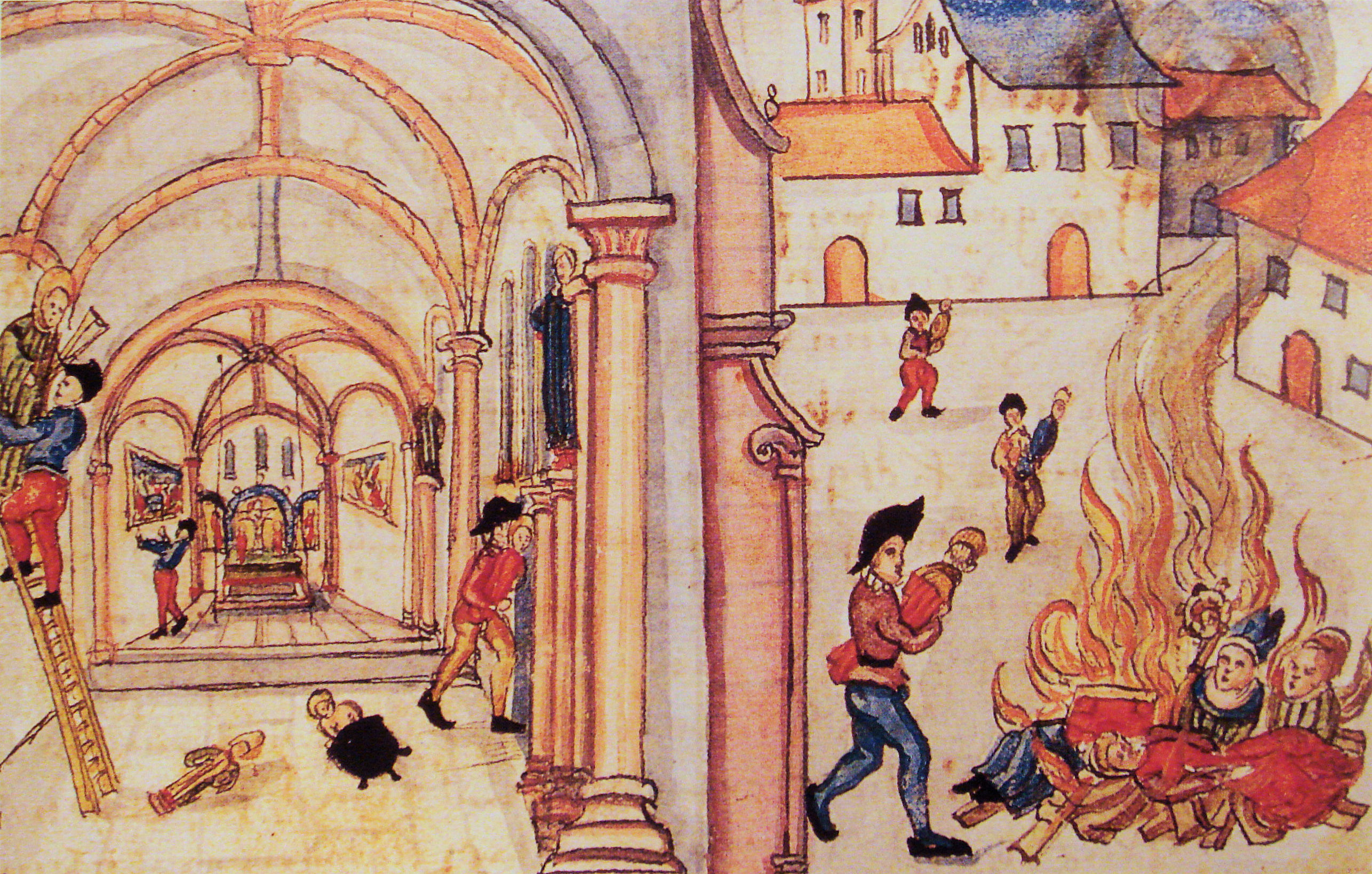
Iconoclasm in Zurich, 1524.

In the following two years, profound changes took place in Zürich. The Church was thoroughly secularised. Priests were relieved from celibacy and the opulent decorations in the churches were thrown out. The state assumed the administration of Church properties, financing the social works (which up to then were managed entirely by the Church), and also paid the priests. The last abbess of the Fraumünster, Katharina von Zimmern, turned over the convent including all of its rights and possessions to the city authorities on 30 November 1524. She even married the next year.

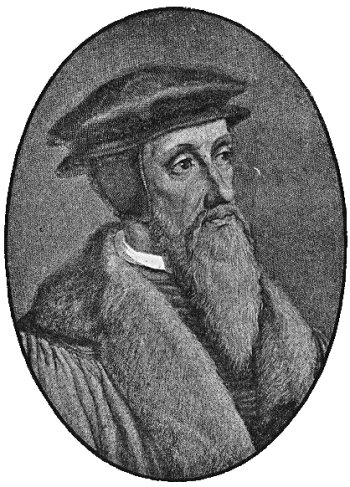
John Calvin

Over the next few years, the cities of St. Gallen, Schaffhausen, Basel, Bienne, Mulhouse, and Bern all followed the example set by Zürich. Bern was the first to follow Zürich, in 1528, when the aftermath of the Bern Disputation officially pronounced Bern as the second Protestant Swiss canton. Their subject territories were converted to Protestantism by decree. In Basel, reformer Johannes Oecolampadius was active, in St. Gallen, the Reformation was adopted by the mayor Joachim Vadian. In Glarus, Appenzell, and in the Grisons, which all three had a more republican structure, individual communes decided for or against the Reformation. In the French-speaking parts, reformers like William Farel had been preaching the new faith under Bernese protection since the 1520s, but only in 1536, just before John Calvin arrived there, did the city of Geneva fully convert to Protestantism. The same year, Bern conquered the hitherto Savoyard Vaud and also instituted Protestantism there.

Despite their conversion to Protestantism, the citizens of Geneva were not ready to adopt Calvin's new strict Church order and banned him and Farel from the city in 1538. Three years later, following the election of a new city council, Calvin was called back. Step by step he implemented his strict program. A counter-revolt in 1555 failed, and many established families left the city.

=== In search of a common theology ===
Zwingli, who had studied in Basel at the same time as Erasmus, had arrived at a more radical renewal than Luther and his ideas differed from the latter in several points. A reconciliation attempt at the Marburg Colloquy in 1529 failed. Although the two charismatic leaders found a consensus on fourteen points, they kept differing on the last one on the Eucharist: Luther maintained that through sacramental union the bread and wine in the Lord's Supper became truly the flesh and blood of Christ, whereas Zwingli considered the bread and wine only symbols. This schism and the defeat of Zürich in the Second War of Kappel in 1531, where Zwingli was killed on the battlefield, were a serious setback, for Zwinglianism.

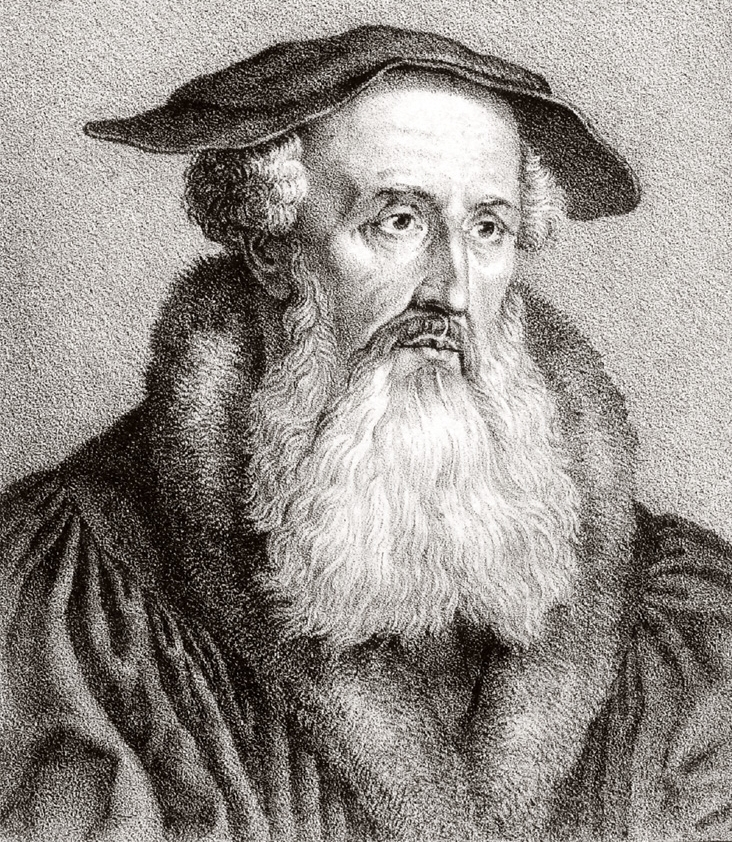
Heinrich Bullinger

After Zwingli's death, Heinrich Bullinger took over his post in Zürich. Reformers in Switzerland continued for the next decades to reform the Church and to improve its acceptance by the common people. Bullinger in particular also tried bridging the differences between Zwinglianism and Calvinism. He was instrumental in establishing the Consensus Tigurinus of 1549 with John Calvin and the Confessio Helvetica posterior of 1566, which finally included all Protestant cantons and associates of the confederacy. The Confessio was also accepted in other European Protestant regions in Bohemia, Hungary, Poland, the Netherlands, and Scotland, and together with the Heidelberg Catechism of 1563, where Bullinger also played an important role, and the Canons of Dordrecht of 1619 it would become the theological foundation of Protestantism of the Calvinist strain.

The Consensus Tigurinus (Zurich Consensus) formalized the Calvinist-Bullingerian doctrine of the pneumatic presence taught in the Reformed Churches, which asserts that when communicants receive the bread and wine, they also receive the body of Christ and the blood of Christ by faith. It declared that the eucharist was not just symbolic of the meal, but they also rejected the Lutheran position that the body and blood of Christ is in union with the elements. It was this Calvinist-Bullingerian doctrine of a real spiritual presence of Christ in the Eucharist that became the doctrine of the Reformed Churches, while Zwingli's view was rejected by the Reformed Churches (though it was later adopted by other traditions, such as the Plymouth Brethren). With this rapprochement, Calvin established his role in the Swiss Reformed Churches and eventually in the wider world. This is reflected in the Second Helvetic Confession (1566), the confession of faith of the Protestant Church of Switzerland, which states: "The Supper is not a mere commemoration of Christ’s benefits…but rather a mystical and spiritual participation in the body and blood of the Lord."

== Religious civil war ==
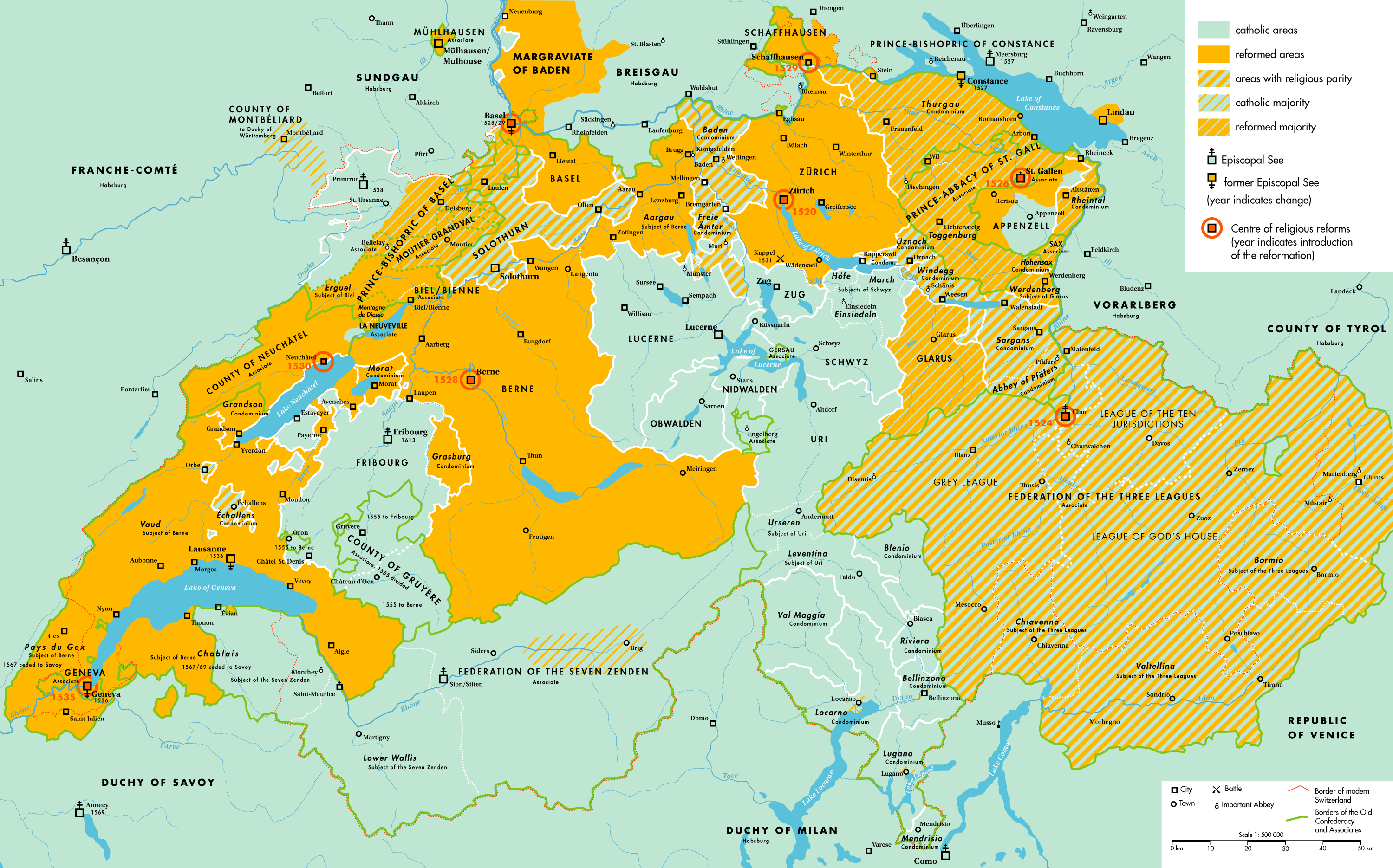
Map of the Old Swiss Confederacy 1536 showing the religious division

The success of the Reformation in Zürich and its rapid territorial expansion definitely made this religious renewal a political issue and a major source of conflict between the thirteen cantons. The alpine cantons of Uri, Schwyz, Unterwalden, Lucerne, and Zug remained staunchly Catholic. Their opposition was not uniquely a question of faith; economic reasons also played a role. Besides on agriculture, their economy depended to a large degree on the mercenary services and the financial recompensations for the same. They could not afford to lose this source of income, which was a major target of reformatory criticism. In contrast, the cities' economies were more diversified, including strong crafts and guilds as well as a budding industrial sector. Fribourg and Solothurn also remained Catholic.

The five alpine cantons perceived the Reformation as a threat early on; already in 1524 they formed the "League of the Five Cantons" (Bund der fünf Orte) to combat the spreading of the new faith. Both sides tried to strengthen their positions by concluding defensive alliances with third parties: the Protestant cantons formed a city alliance, including the Protestant cities of Konstanz and Strasbourg (Christliches Burgrecht), translated variously as Cristian Civic Union, Christian Co-burghery, Christian Confederation and Christian Federation (in Latin Zwingli called it Civitas Christiana or Christian State); the Catholic ones entered a pact with Ferdinand of Austria.

In the tense atmosphere, small incidents could easily escalate. Conflicts arose especially over the situation in the common territories, where the administration changed bi-annually among cantons and thus switched between Catholic and Protestant rules. Several mediation attempts failed such as the disputation of Baden in 1526.

After numerous minor incidents and provocations from both sides, a Protestant pastor was burned on the stake in Schwyz in 1529, and in retaliation Zürich declared war. By mediation of the other cantons, open war (known as the First War of Kappel) was barely avoided, but the peace agreement (Erster Landfriede) was not exactly favourable for the Catholic party, who had to dissolve its alliance with the Austrian Habsburgs. The tensions remained essentially unresolved.

The forces of Zürich are defeated in the battle of Kappel.

Two years later, the Second War of Kappel broke out. Zürich was taking the refusal of the Catholic cantons to help the Grisons in the Musso war as a pretext, but on 11 October 1531, the Catholic cantons decisively defeated the forces of Zürich in the battle of Kappel am Albis. Zwingli was killed on the battlefield. The Protestant cantons had to agree to a peace treaty, the so-called Zweiter Kappeler Landfriede, which forced the dissolution of the Protestant alliance (Christliches Burgrecht). It gave Catholicism the priority in the common territories, but allowed communes that had already converted to remain Protestant. Only strategically important places such as the Freiamt or those along the route from Schwyz to the Rhine valley at Sargans (and thus to the Alpine passes in the Grisons) were forcibly re-Catholicised. In their own territories, the cantons remained free to implement one or the other religion. The peace thus prescribed the Cuius regio, eius religio-principle that would also be adopted in the peace of Augsburg in the Holy Roman Empire in 1555. Politically, this gave the Catholic cantons a majority in the Tagsatzung, the federal diet of the confederacy.

When their Protestant city alliance was dissolved, Zürich and the southern German cities joined the Schmalkaldic League, but in the German religious wars of 1546/47, Zürich and the other Swiss Protestant cantons remained strictly neutral. With the victory of Charles V the previously close relations to the Swabian Protestant cities in the Holy Roman Empire were severed: many cities, like Konstanz, were re-Catholicised and many were placed under a strictly aristocratic rule.

== Counter-Reformation ==
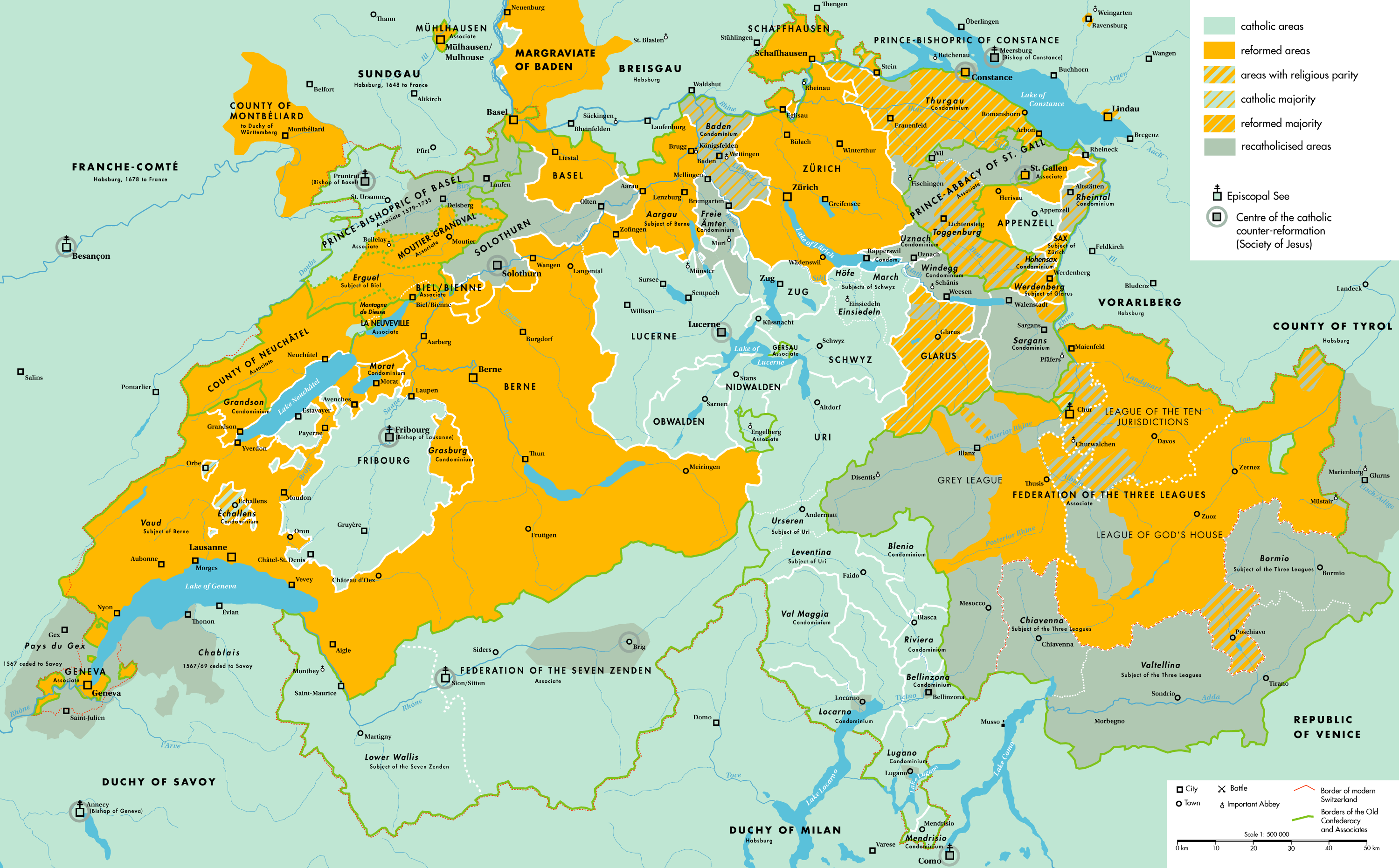
Religious division of the Old Confederacy during the 17th and 18th centuries

While the official Church remained passive during the beginnings of the Reformation, the Swiss Catholic cantons took measures early on to keep the new movement at bay. They assumed judicial and financial powers over the clergy, laid down firm rules of conduct for the priests, outlawed concubinage, and reserved the right to nominate priests in the first place, who previously had been assigned by the bishoprics. They also banned printing, distributing, and possessing Reformist tracts; and banned the study of Hebrew and Greek (to put an end to the independent study of biblical sources). Overall, these measures were successful: not only did they prevent the spreading of the Reformation into the Catholic cantons but also they made the Church dependent on the state and generally strengthened the power of the civil authorities.

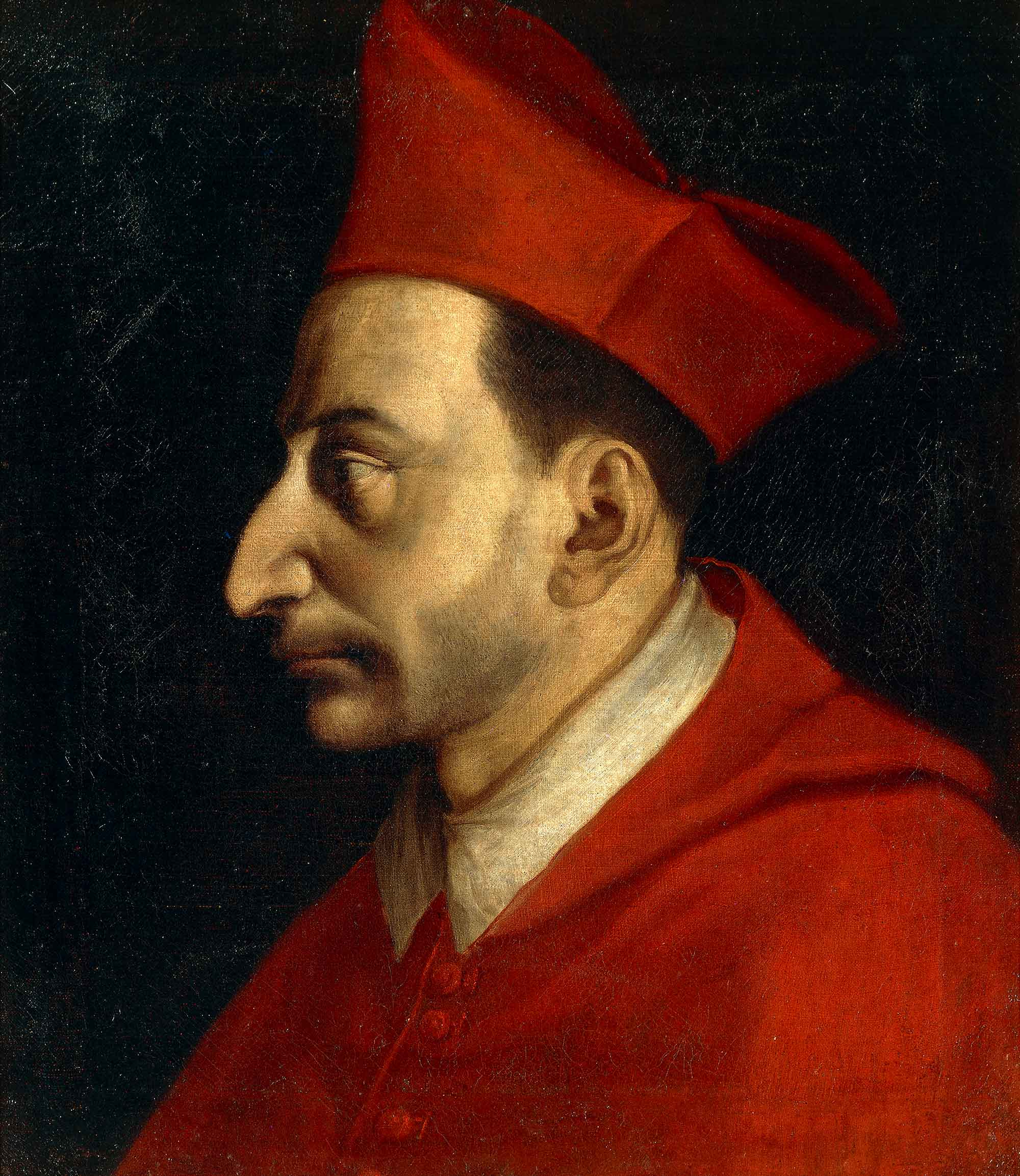
Carlo Borromeo

The Catholic cantons also maintained their domination of the Catholic Church after the Council of Trent (1545 to 1563), although they had accepted its positions. They opposed Cardinal Borromeo's plans for the creation of a new bishopric in central Switzerland. However, they did participate in the education program of Trent. In 1574, the first Jesuit school was founded in Lucerne. Others soon followed, and in 1579, a Catholic university for Swiss priests, the Collegio helvetico, was founded in Milan. In 1586, a nunciature was opened in Lucerne. The Capuchins were also called to help; a Capuchin cloister was founded in 1581 in Altdorf.

Parallel to these efforts to reform the Catholic Church, the Catholic cantons also proceeded to re-Catholicize regions that had converted to Protestantism. Besides reconversions in the common territories, the Catholic cantons in 1560 first tried to undo the Reformation in Glarus, where the Catholics were a minority.

The five Catholic cantons formed a military alliance with the Pope and the Catholic Duchy of Savoy, and had the support of Aegidius Tschudi, the Landammann (chief magistrate) of Glarus. But due to lack of money, they could not intervene in Glarus by force. In 1564, they settled for a treaty which prescribed the separation of religions in Glarus. There were henceforth two legislative assemblies (Landsgemeinde) in the canton, a Catholic and a Protestant one, and Glarus would send one Catholic and one Protestant representative each to the Tagsatzung.

The Bishop of Basel, Jakob Christoph Blarer von Wartensee, moved his seat to Porrentruy in the Jura Mountains in 1529, when Basel became Protestant. In 1581, the bishopric regained the Birs valley lying southwest of Basel. In Appenzell, where both confessions coexisted more or less peacefully, the counter-reformatory activities beginning with the arrival of the Capuchin friars resulted in a split of the canton in 1597 into the Catholic Appenzell Innerrhoden and the Protestant Ausserrhoden, which both had one vote in the Tagsatzung.

== Developments in the west ==
The Dukes of Savoy had tried already for centuries to gain sovereignty over the city of Geneva, surrounded by Savoyard territory, for the Vaud in the north of Lake Geneva belonged to the duchy. The Reformation prompted the conflicts to escalate once more. Geneva exiled its bishop, who was backed by Savoy, in 1533 to Annecy. Bern and the Valais took advantage of the duke's involvement in northern Italy and his opposition to France. When Francesco II Sforza died in Milan in 1534, the duke's troops were bound by the French engagement there, and Bern promptly conquered the Vaud and, together with the Valais, also territories south of Lake Geneva in 1536.

The alliance of 1560 of the Catholic cantons with Savoy encouraged duke Emmanuel Philibert to raise claims on the territories his father Charles III had lost in 1536. After the treaty of Lausanne of 1564, Bern had to return the Chablais south of Lake Geneva and the Pays de Gex (between Geneva and Nyon) to Savoy in 1567, and the Valais returned the territories west of Saint Gingolph two years later in the treaty of Thonon. Geneva was thus a Protestant enclave within the Catholic territories of Savoy again and as a result intensified its relations with the Swiss confederacy and Bern and Zürich in particular. Its plea for full acceptance into the confederation—the city was an associate state only—was rejected by the Catholic majority of cantons.

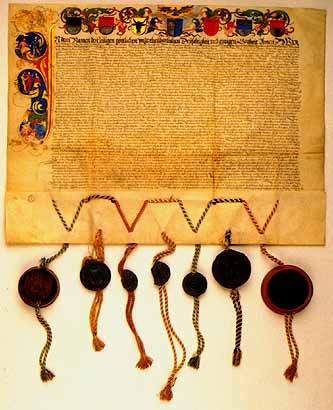
Goldener Bund of 1586

Mercenaries of the Swiss cantons participated in the French wars of religion on all sides. Those from Protestant cantons fought on the sides of the Huguenots, supporting Henry of Navarre, while the Catholic troops fought for king Henry III of France. In 1586, the seven Catholic cantons (the five alpine cantons, plus Fribourg and Solothurn) formed an exclusively Catholic alliance called the "Golden League" (Goldener Bund, named after the golden initials on the document) and sided with the Guises, who were also supported by Spain. In 1589, Henry III was assassinated and Henry of Navarre succeeded him as Henry IV of France, and thus the Protestant mercenaries now fought for the king.

Since 1586, the duke of Savoy, Charles Emmanuel I, had placed Geneva under an embargo. With the new situation of 1589, the city now got support not only from Bern but also from the French king, and it went to war. The war between Geneva and Savoy continued even after the Peace of Vervins and the Edict of Nantes in 1598, which ended the wars in France proper. In the night from 11 to 12 December 1602, the duke's troops unsuccessfully tried to storm the city, which definitely maintained its independence from Savoy in the peace of Saint Julien, concluded in the following summer. The rebuttal of this attack, L'Escalade, is still commemorated in Geneva today.

Also in 1586, a Catholic coup d'état in Mulhouse, an associate of the confederacy, prompted the military intervention of the Protestant cantons, which quickly restored the old Protestant order. Strasbourg, another Protestant city, wanted to join the confederacy in 1588, but like Geneva some twenty years earlier, it was rejected by the Catholic cantons. In the Valais, the Reformation had had some success especially in the lower part of the Rhône valley. However, in 1603 the Catholic cantons intervened, and with their support re-Catholicisation succeeded and the Protestant families had to emigrate.

== Thirty Years' War ==
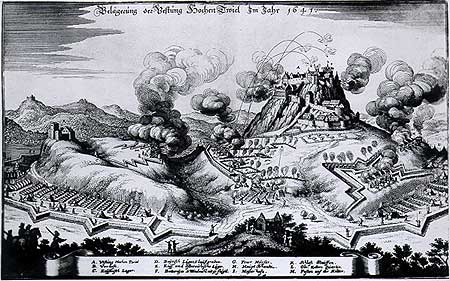
Siege of the Hohentwiel fort in 1641.

During the Thirty Years' War, Switzerland was a relative "oasis of peace and prosperity" (Grimmelshausen) in war-torn Europe. The cantons had concluded numerous mercenary contracts and defence alliances with partners on all sides. Some of these contracts neutralized each other, which allowed the confederation to remain neutral. Politically, the neighbouring powers all tried to take influence, by way of mercenary commanders such as Jörg Jenatsch or Johann Rudolf Wettstein.

Despite the cantons' religious differences, the Tagsatzung developed a strong consensus against any direct military involvement. The confederacy did not allow any foreign army to cross its territory: the alpine passes remained closed for Spain, just as an alliance offer of the Swedish King Gustav Adolph was rejected. The sole exception was the permission for the French army of Henri de Rohan to march through the Protestant cantons to the Grisons. A common defence was mounted only in 1647 when the Swedish armies reached Lake Constance again.

The Grisons had no such luck. The Three Leagues were a loose federation of 48 individual communes that were largely independent; their common assembly held no real powers. While this had helped avoid major religious wars during and following the Reformation, feuds between leading clans (e.g. between the von Planta and the von Salis) were common. When such a feud spilled over into the Valtellina in 1619, a subject territory of the Three Leagues, the population there responded in kind, killing the Protestant rulers in 1620 and calling Habsburg Spain for help. For the next twenty years, the Grisons was ravaged by a war known as the Confusion of the Leagues. For the Habsburgs, the Grisons was a strategically important connection between Milan and Austria. The Valtellina became Spanish, and other parts in the north-east of the Grisons were occupied and re-Catholicised by Austria.

France intervened a first time in 1624, but succeeded to drive the Spanish out of the Grisons only in 1636. However, Henri de Rohan's French army had to withdraw following the political intrigues of Jürg Jenatsch, who managed to play the French off against the Spaniards. Until 1639, the Three Leagues had re-acquired their whole territory, buying back the parts occupied by Austria. They even were restituted their subject territories in the south (Valtellina, Bormio, and Chiavenna), yet these had to remain Catholic under the protection of Milan.

The mayor of Basel, Johann Rudolf Wettstein, lobbied for a formal recognition of the Swiss confederacy as an independent state in the peace of Westphalia. Although de facto independent since the end of the Swabian War in 1499, the confederacy was still officially a part of the Holy Roman Empire. With the support of Henri II d'Orléans, who was also prince of Neuchâtel and the head of the French delegation, he succeeded to get the formal exemption from the empire for all cantons and associates of the confederacy.

== Social developments ==
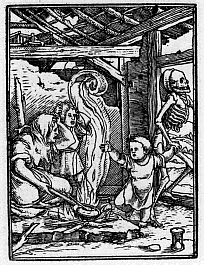
A sheet of Hans Holbein's Totentanz, 1538.

Historians count 13 (Geneva) or 14 (St Gallen) plague surges in Switzerland between 1500 and 1640, accounting for 31 plague years, and since 1580, smallpox outbreaks with an especially high mortality rate (80–90%) amongst children under the age of five occurred every four to five years. Nevertheless, the population in Switzerland grew in the 16th century from about 800,000 to roughly 1.1 million, i.e. by more than 35%.

=== Absolutism on the rise ===
This population growth caused significant changes in a pre-industrial society that could no longer significantly expand its territory. The dependence of the confederation on imports increased, and prices soared. In the countryside, settlements of estates increasingly led to smaller and smaller properties insufficient to sustain a family, and a new class of daytalers (Tauner) grew disproportionally. In the cities, too, the number of poor rose. At the same time, rural subject territories became more and more (financially) dependent on the cities. The political power was concentrated in a few rich families, that over time came to consider their offices as hereditary and tried to limit them to their own exclusive circle. This solicited the response of both peasants and free citizens, who resented such curtailing of their democratic rights, and around 1523/25, also fuelled by the reformatory spirit, revolts broke out in many cantons, both rural and urban. The main objective of the insurgents was the restitution of common rights of old, not the institution of a new order. Although commonly called the Peasants' War, the movement also included the free citizens, who saw their rights restricted in the cities, too. Contrary to the development in the Holy Roman Empire, where the hostilities escalated and the rebellion was put down by force, there were only isolated armed conflicts in the confederation. The authorities, already involved in reformatory or counter-reformatory activities, managed to subdue these uprisings only by granting concessions. Yet the absolutist tendencies kept slowly transforming the democrat cantons into oligarchies. By 1650, the absolutist order was firmly established and would prevail for another 150 years as the Ancien Régime.

=== Persecution of heretics ===
The generally widespread intolerance of the time, as witnessed by the Inquisition, amplified by the conflicts between Protestants and Catholics, left no place for dissenters. Anabaptists, who took the idea of deriving new societal rules from the direct study of Biblical sources even further than the Protestant reformers only into conflict not only with the established Churches over the question of baptism but also with the civil authorities because, not having found any Biblical justification, they refused to pay taxes or to accept any authority. Both Catholic and Protestant cantons persecuted them with all their might. Following the forced drowning of Felix Manz in the Limmat in Zürich in 1527, many Anabaptists emigrated to Moravia. Antitrinitarians fared no better; Miguel Servet was burned at the stake in Geneva on 27 October 1553.

There was no individual freedom of religion in Switzerland—or indeed all of Europe—at that time anyway. The maxim of cuius regio, eius religio ("whose region, his religion") meant that subjects had to adopt the faith of their rulers. Dissenters who didn't want to convert typically had to (but also were allowed to) emigrate elsewhere, into a region where their faith was the state religion. The Bullinger family, for instance, had to move from Bremgarten in the Freiamt, which was re-Catholicised after the second war of Kappel, to the Protestant city of Zürich.

The 16th century also saw the height of witch-hunts in Europe, and Switzerland was no exception. Beginning about 1530, culminating around 1600, and then slowly diminishing, numerous witch trials were held in both Protestant and Catholic cantons. These often ended with death sentences (usually burning) for the accused, who typically were elderly women, crippled persons, or other social outcasts.

=== Science and arts: the Renaissance in Switzerland ===
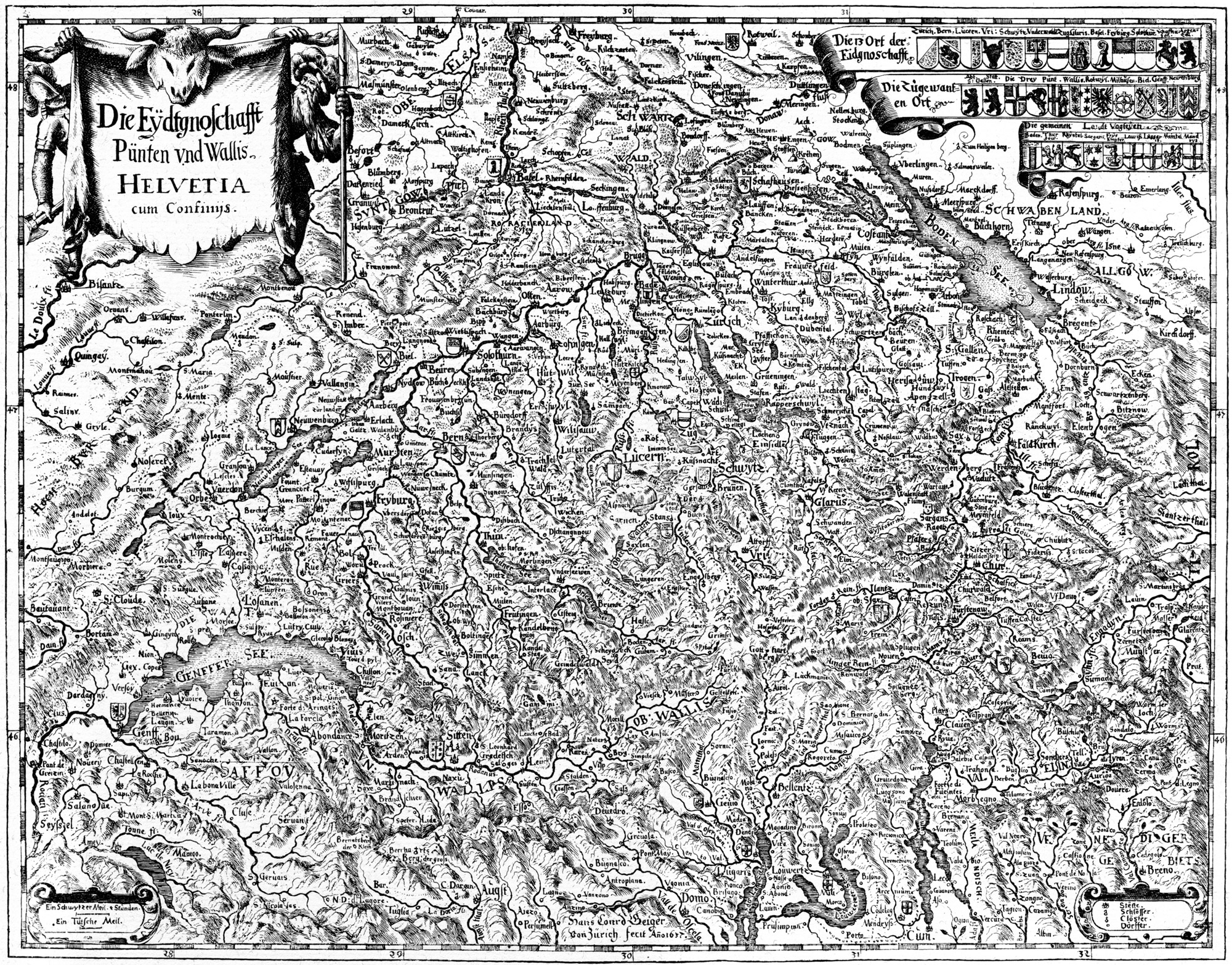
The Old Swiss Confederacy on a map included in the "Topographia Helvetiae" by Matthäus Merian 1652

Humanism and the Renaissance led to new advances in science and the arts. Paracelsus taught at the University of Basel. Hans Holbein the Younger worked until 1526 in Basel; his high renaissance style had a profound influence on Swiss painters. Conrad Gessner in Zürich did studies in systematic botany, and the geographic maps and city views produced e.g. by Matthäus Merian show the beginning of a scientific cartography. In 1601, an early version of the theodolite was invented in Zürich and promptly used to triangulate the city. Basel and Geneva became important printing centres, with an output equal to that of e.g. Strasbourg or Lyon. Their printing reformatory tracts greatly furthered the dissemination of these ideas. First newspapers appeared towards the end of the 16th century, but disappeared soon again due to the censorship of the absolutist authorities. In architecture, there was a strong Italian and especially florentine influence, visible in many a rich magistrate's town house. Famed baroque architect Francesco Borromini was born 1599 in the Ticino.

Many Huguenots and other Protestant refugees from all over Europe fled to Basel, Geneva, and Neuchâtel. Geneva under Calvin and his successor Theodore Beza demanded their naturalisation and strict adherence to the Calvinist doctrine, whereas Basel, where the university had re-opened in 1532, became a center of intellectual freedom. Many of these immigrants were skilled craftsmen or businessmen and contributed greatly to the development of banking and the watch industry.

== See also ==
- Protestant refugees in Switzerland
- Secularization of Church property in Switzerland
- First War of Villmergen
- History of the Grisons
- Swiss Reformed Church
- Toggenburg War (or Second War of Villmergen)
- Otto Zeinenger

== Notes and references ==
The main sources used are

- Gäbler, Ulrich (1986), Huldrych Zwingli: His Life and Work, Philadelphia: Fortress Press, ISBN 0-8006-0761-9.
- Im Hof, U.: Geschichte der Schweiz, 7th ed. Kohlhammer Verlag, 1974/2001. ISBN 3-17-017051-1.
- Schwabe & Co.: Geschichte der Schweiz und der Schweizer, Schwabe & Co 1986/2004. ISBN 3-7965-2067-7.

Other sources:
