= Sigg =

Swiss bottle manufacturing company

- Type: Limited company
- Industry: manufacturing
- Founded: 1908
- Headquarters: Frauenfeld (TG), Switzerland
- Key people: Ferdinand Sigg (founder)
- Products: Bottles
- Website: www.sigg.com

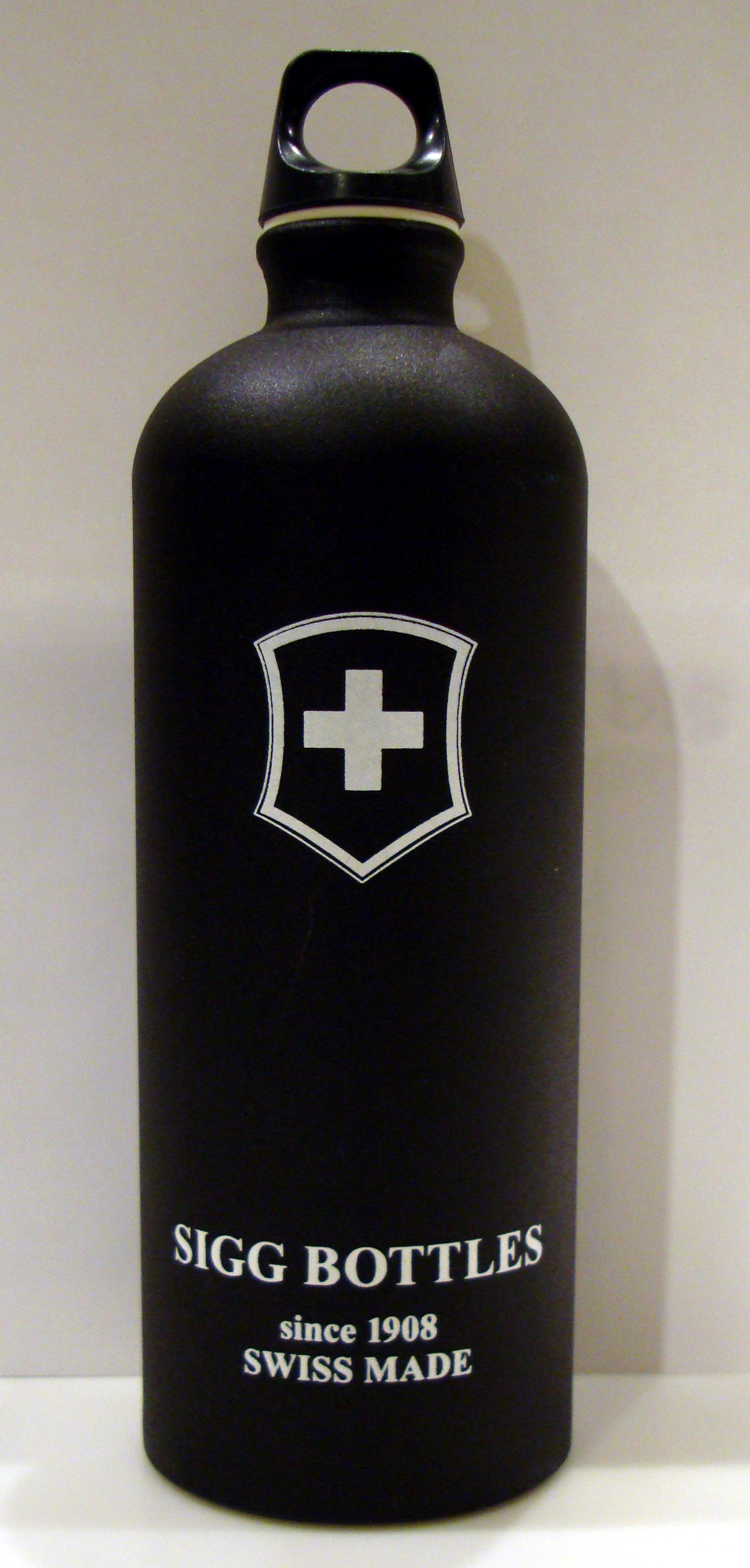
Classic Sigg bottle

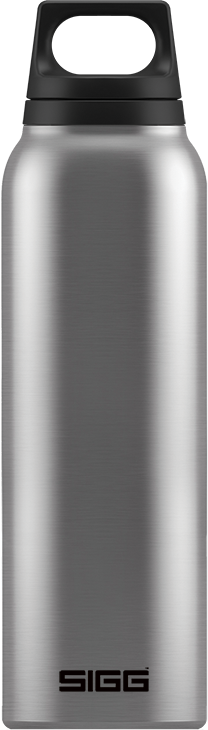
Sigg bottle made of Stainless Steel.

Sigg Switzerland AG is a Swiss manufacturing company with its headquarters in Frauenfeld. Sigg bottles are bottles designed and manufactured in Switzerland from aluminum and polypropylene or in China from stainless steel and glass. The company is famous because of the iconic shape of its classic bottle and numerous designs which have led to its addition to the permanent design collection of the New York Museum of Modern Art.

== History ==
The company was founded in Biel in 1908 by Ferdinand Sigg and Xavier Küng under the name Küng, Sigg & Cie. and produced kitchenware, bottles and electrical appliances from aluminum. In 1916 the company moved to Frauenfeld and changed the name to SIGG Aluminiumfabrik. Since 1998, the company has concentrated on the manufacture of bottles. According to market research, the company name is known by 70 percent of people in German-speaking countries.

Through the 1980s Sigg manufactured impact-extruded aluminum bottles for stove fuel storage and transport, popular with mountaineers, hikers and campers. The fuel bottles superficially resemble the water bottles, but lack the special linings of the latter. The company no longer manufactures fuel bottles.

On February 5, 2016, the Chinese company Haers Vacuum Containers announced that it acquired the bottle manufacturer for 16.1 million Swiss franc ($16.02 million).

== Interchangeability ==
All Sigg bottles use the same diameter head and thread system, which results in interchangeability of bottles and caps. Different cap styles exist, such as a normal screw on cap with loop, caps with glow-in-the-dark markers, sports-bottle caps and caps with added protection from dust.

== Aluminum bottles ==
The aluminum bottles are made by an extruding press which forms an aluminum puck into a cylinder in a single movement after which it is pressed into one of several possible bottle sizes. A separate threading ring is inserted and secured. Once the bottle has been formed, it is cleaned and the interior is sprayed with a food-compatible stove enamel which is heated while the outside is coated and heat bonded with powder paint.

Aluminum bottles are resistant to shocks and deformations, are lightweight, and protect the contents from light. The interior coating is flexible and is unlikely to break or crack during deformations. Sigg bottles have been determined by Backpacker magazine to be the "world's toughest water bottle" when they fired golf balls at the water bottles with a 100-pound cannon. The bottle with its internal liner and secure cap allow for carbonated beverages to be transported secure and fresh. All Sigg bottles manufactured after August 2008 use the "EcoCare" liner, which Sigg states is 'made from BPA-free and phthalate-free ingredients'.

The disadvantage of thin aluminum is that it does not offer much insulation, which means that condensation can build on the outside of the bottle when cold drinks are transported, and hot drinks will result in a bottle which cannot be comfortably touched. Sigg sells insulating sleeves that protect the bottle from dents, help insulate the beverages inside them and eliminate the condensation issue. The limited size of the opening also makes it difficult to fill or clean the bottle or to use it for purposes other than drinking, though Sigg now makes wide-mouth bottles, and adapters that allow the use of the standard-size caps. Aluminum bottles are also more prone to dents than stainless steel bottles. Another disadvantage is that the bottles are unsuitable for freezing its contents, as freezing liquids expand in volume and cause the bottle to crack. Therefore, it is advisable not to keep fluids in the container during extended periods below freezing temperatures.

== Stainless steel bottles ==
In 2013 SIGG introduced a new material into its collection, stainless steel. With the Hot & Cold line made of stainless steel SIGG offers a solution for insulated bottles. These bottles have a double wall vacuum insulation which allows them to keep temperatures, cold or hot, during several hours. One advantage of these bottles is that they do not need an inner liner to protect the liquids and they are more resistant against dents and scratches than the aluminum bottles.

== Polypropylene bottles ==
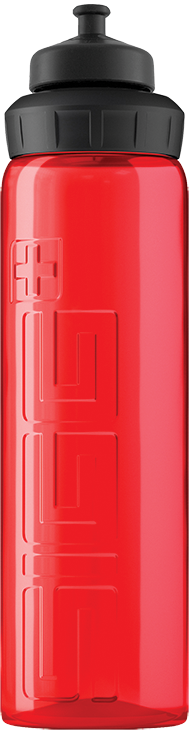
SIGG VIVA made of polypropylene.

Since April 2014 SIGG started manufacturing bottles made of high-grade 100% recyclable polypropylene, a safe, durable and eco-friendly plastic. As part of the philosophy of the company means to keep the swissness of its products, the SIGG VIVA bottles are produced in Switzerland. SIGG ensures that these bottles are free of BPA and they are produced with the same ecological standards of the aluminum bottles. These sport orientated bottles have the advantage that they are transparent allowing to see the inside and they are very resistant against dent and scratches.

== Glass bottle ==
In 2015 SIGG the Swiss company enlarged its portfolio of product materials with presented a new bottle made of glass. The bottle consists of two walls of heat-resistant borosilicate glass, a WMB (wide mouth bottle) opening to allow for the addition of ice cubes, and two removable silicone elements: a grip around the body of the bottle and a base stand with shock-absorbing strips. These elements protect the fingers and prevent the bottle from breaking by being knocked or set down too heavily. The two separate glass walls provide optimal insulation, so cold drinks stay cool (for up to two hours) and hot drinks stay pleasantly warm (for up to one hour). The bottle can be comfortably handled even when it contains hot drinks and the outer wall does not build up condensation when it contains cold ones. The liquid only comes into contact with glass and stainless steel so its flavor remains unaffected. All the materials used for the bottle are BPA and BPS free.

== Design ==
Each year, new designs of the Sigg bottle are added to the collection while others are no longer produced. The design of Sigg bottle has led to its addition to the permanent design collection of the New York Museum of Modern Art. The classic bottle is of a single colour (most often red) whilst more modern bottles can have designs on them and are available in both glossy or matte finishes.
