= Grande Boutique =

16th-17th century merchant consortium in Geneva

- Founded: 1556
- Founder: Francesco Micheli
- Dissolved: 1628
- Type: Merchant consortium
- Location: Geneva, Switzerland
- Products: Silk manufacturing and trade, Banking

The Grande Boutique was a prominent merchant consortium and trading house that operated in Geneva from 1556 to 1628 during the 16th and 17th centuries. Connected to the first Refuge (the initial wave of Protestant refugees to Geneva), it served as both a trading post for Italian merchants and a consortium that united most Lucchese families through their manufacturing and commercial activities, as well as through the funds they invested in the enterprise.

== History ==
The Grande Boutique began as a simple trading post founded by Francesco Micheli in 1556. The enterprise gained significant momentum when it became the focal point for business dealings of various companies that included prominent families such as the Arnolfini, Micheli, and later the Diodati and Balbani (1582), as well as the Burlamacchi and François Turrettini (1593).

The consortium reached its peak under the leadership of François Turrettini, who directed nine companies from 1593 until his death in 1628. These companies represented the most powerful center of Geneva's silk industry. They brought together the expertise and capital of the Lucchese colony with those of Zurichers Felix Orelli and Georg Gessner, who served as intermediaries in business dealings with northern Switzerland, Germany, and the Netherlands.

The consortium's capital grew dramatically during this period, increasing from 18,000 gold écus in 1594 to 150,000 in 1619. Annual profits fluctuated between 15 and 30% of capital during the most successful years.

=== Decline and legacy ===
The Grande Boutique operated until 1628, coinciding with the death of François Turrettini, who had been instrumental in its growth and success. The consortium represented a significant chapter in Geneva's economic history, particularly in the development of the city's silk industry and its role as a center for refugee entrepreneurship during the Protestant Reformation.

== Business operations ==
The consortium earned its name "Grande Boutique" (Great Shop) not only due to the large number of people who conducted business there or depended on it for their work in the silk industry, but also because of the scale of transactions conducted with foreign markets. The enterprise's success stemmed from the extensive networks it established to obtain raw materials under advantageous conditions, including silk imported from China via Amsterdam or from Spain.

To reduce production costs, the consortium employed innovative strategies such as utilizing the workforce of the Zurich countryside for thread preparation. The Lucchese merchants of the Grande Boutique also played a decisive role as bankers in Geneva, leveraging their financial expertise to provide banking services to the city.

== Bibliography ==
- Bodmer, W. Der Einfluss der Refugianteneinwanderung von 1550-1700 auf die schweizerische Wirtschaft, 1946
- Mottu-Weber, L. Economie et Refuge à Genève au siècle de la Réforme, 1987, 330-336, 378-385
- Mottu-Weber, L. "Les activités des marchands-banquiers et des 'entrepreneurs' lucquois à Genève aux XVIe et XVIIe s.", in Lucca e l'Europa degli affari, éd. R. Mazzei, T. Fanfani, 1990, 133-148
