= Johann Kaspar Mörikofer =

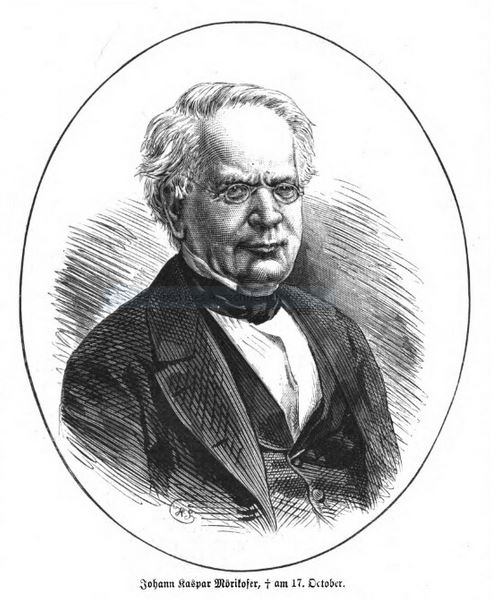
Johann Kaspar Mörikofer

Johann Kaspar Mörikofer (11 October 1799, in Frauenfeld, Switzerland – 17 October 1877, in Riesbach) was a Swiss literary and ecclesiastical historian.

== Biography ==
He studied theology at the Carolinum in Zürich, and from 1822 to 1851 was provisor and rector of city schools in Frauenfeld. From 1851 to 1869 he served as a pastor in Gottlieben. He obtained honorary doctorates at the universities of Zürich (PhD, 1872) and Basel (theology, 1876).

== Works ==
His historical works have scientific value and literary charm; they include:

- Die schweizerische Mundart im Verhältnis zur hochdeutschen Schriftsprache (1838) – The Swiss dialect in relation to the High German written language.
- Klopstock in Zürich im Jahre 1750–1751 (1851) – Friedrich Gottlieb Klopstock in Zürich in the years 1750/51.
- Die schweizerische Litteratur des 18. Jarhunderts (1861) – Swiss literature in the 18th century.
- Ulrich Zwingli: Nach den urkundlichen Quellen (1867–69) – Ulrich Zwingli: According to documentary sources.
- Geschichte der evangelischen Flüchtlinge in der Schweiz (1876) – History of Protestant refugees In Switzerland.

== Sources ==
- Gerold Meyer von Knonau (1885). "Mörikofer, Johann Kaspar". Allgemeine Deutsche Biographie (in German). Vol. 22. Leipzig: Duncker & Humblot. pp. 258–260.
