= Frauenfeld =

Municipality in Switzerland

- Municipality
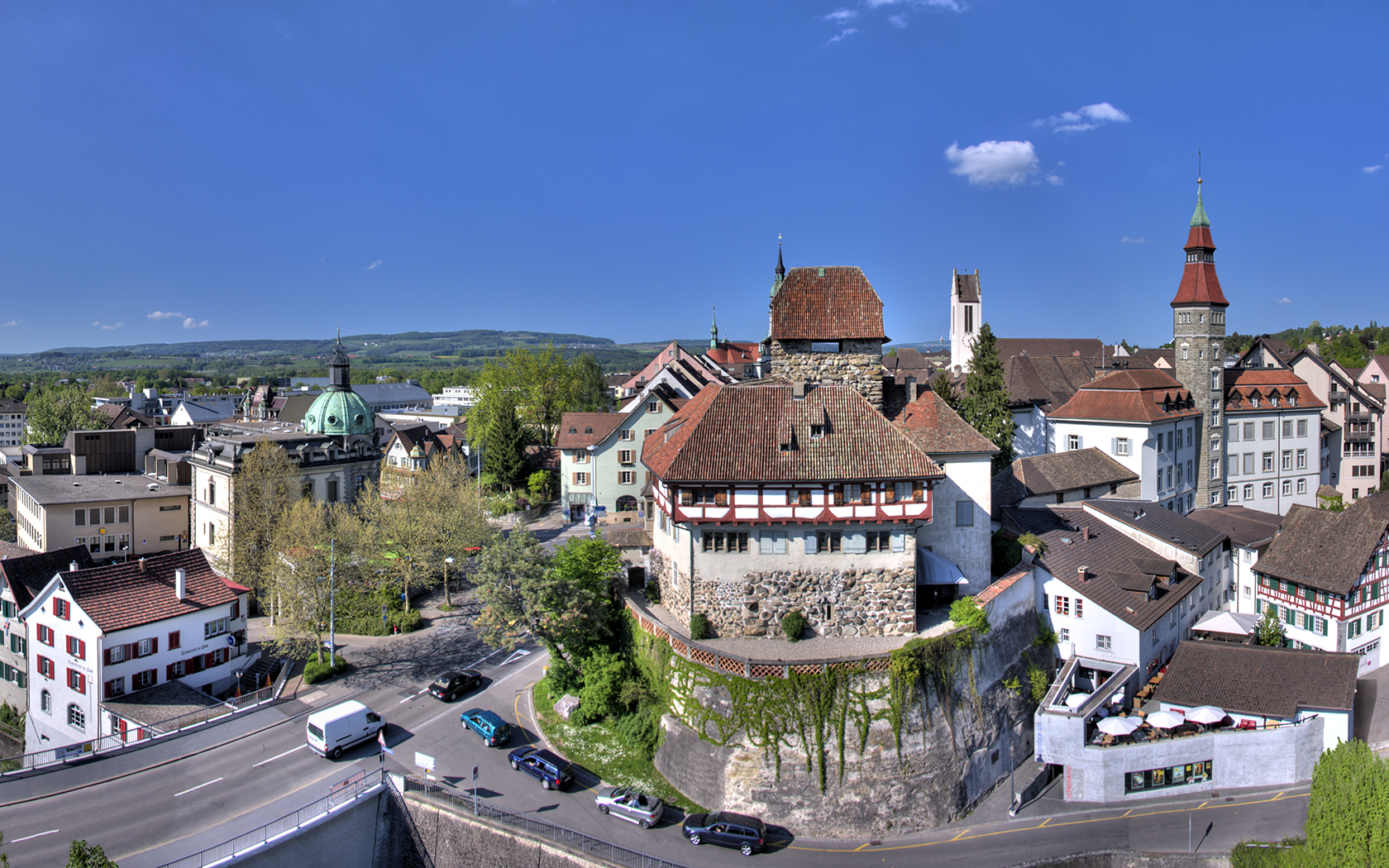

- Flag Coat of arms
- Location of Frauenfeld
- Location within Switzerland Location within Canton of Thurgau
- Coordinates: 47°33′N 8°54′E
- Country: Switzerland
- Canton: Thurgau
- District: Frauenfeld

Government
  - Executive: Stadtrat with 5 members
  - Mayor: Stadtammann (list); Anders Stokholm FDP/PRD (as of October 2020)
  - Parliament: Gemeinderat with 40 members

Area
  - Total: 27.35 km^{2} (10.56 sq mi)
- Elevation (Church): 405 m (1,329 ft)
- Highest elevation (Stääli at Oberherten): 593 m (1,946 ft)
- Lowest elevation (Brüel at Horgenbach): 380 m (1,250 ft)

Population (December 2007)
  - Total: 22,313
  - Density: 815.8/km^{2} (2,113/sq mi)
- Time zone: UTC+01:00 (CET)
  - Summer (DST): UTC+02:00 (CEST)
- Postal code: 8500
- SFOS number: 4566
- ISO 3166 code: CH-TG
- Localities: Gerlikon, Herten, Horgenbach, Huben, Kurzdorf, Langdorf, Schönenhof, Zelgli
- Surrounded by: Aadorf, Bertschikon bei Attikon (ZH), Ellikon an der Thur (ZH), Felben-Wellhausen, Gachnang, Hagenbuch (ZH), Matzingen, Thundorf, Uesslingen-Buch, Warth-Weiningen
- Twin towns: Kufstein (Austria)
- Website: www.frauenfeld.ch

Frauenfeld (Swiss Standard German pronunciation: [ˈfraʊənˌfɛld]; Alemannic German: Frauefäld) is the capital (German: Hauptort) of the canton of Thurgau in Switzerland.

== History ==
=== Early history ===
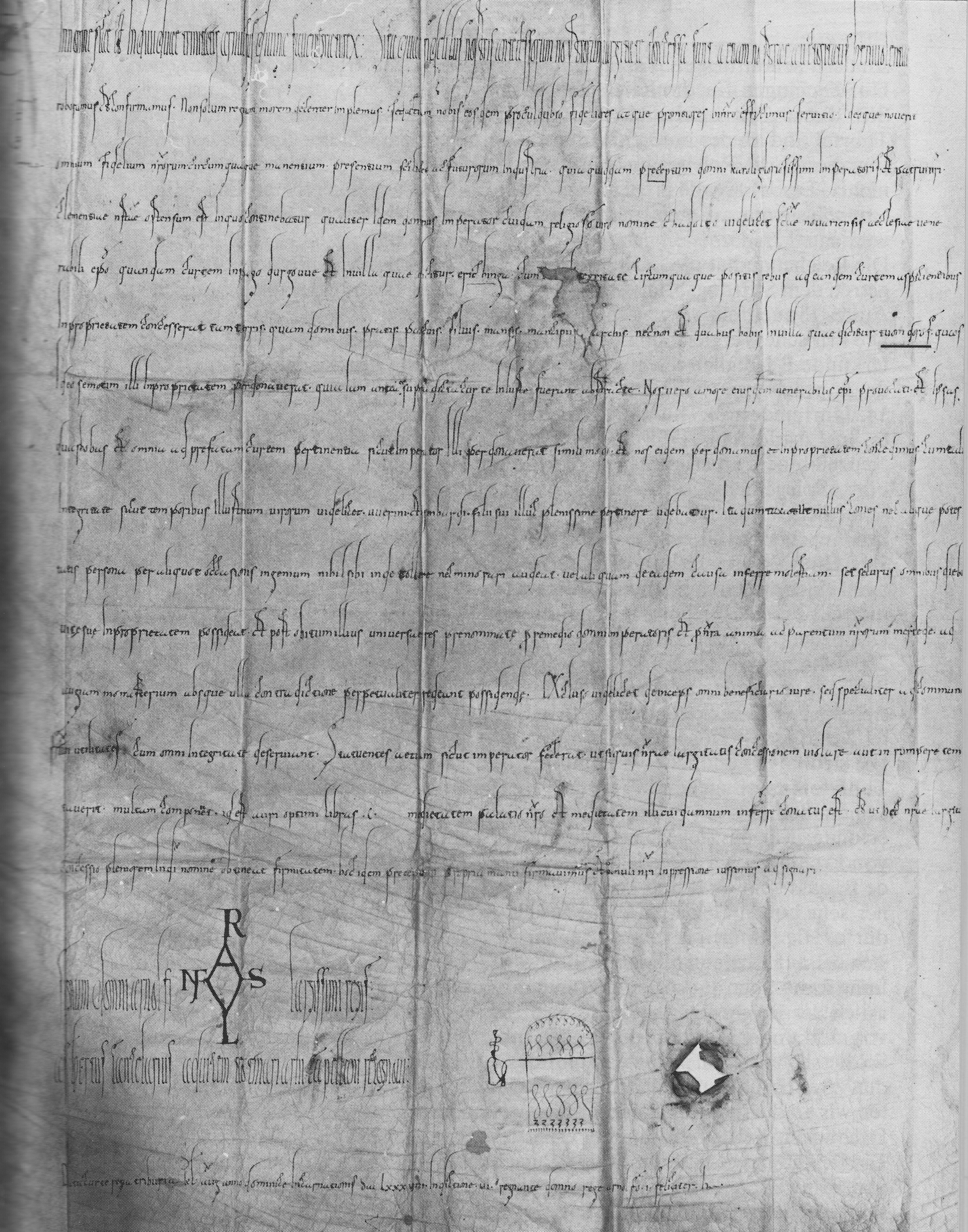
Document signed by Arnulf of Carinthia, dated 888 but possibly from the 11th or 12th century, granting the manor farm of Erchingen to Reichenau Abbey

The earliest traces of human settlement are several La Tène era graves to the east of Langdorf. The Roman road from Oberwinterthur (Vitudurum) to Pfyn ran through what is now the Allmend in Frauenfeld. Two Roman villas were discovered in Thalbach and Oberkirch. The villa seems to have become the focal point of the later settlement of Oberkirch. On the ruins of the villa, an Early Middle Ages cemetery was built, and by the 9th century, the Oberkirch church was built. Perhaps as a result of royal donation in the 9th century, or more likely a donation in the 13th century, the area around Frauenfeld belonged to the Dinghof (a church- or monastery-owned manor farm) of Erching. Erching had a manor house, twelve houses, at least one mill, and probably also a church in Oberkirch. In the 13th century, Erching formed a self-contained manor farm complex and was occupied by a Habsburg Vogt after 1270. Starting in the late 12th century, a village grew up in the area around Erching and another grew up around the church at Oberkirch.

By the end of the 1220s, a fortified tower with a mill and chapel was built and a third village began to grow up around the castle. This village, which would become Frauenfeld, grew gradually on land owned by Reichenau Abbey. The original fortified tower grew into Frauenfeld Castle.

=== Foundation of Frauenfeld ===
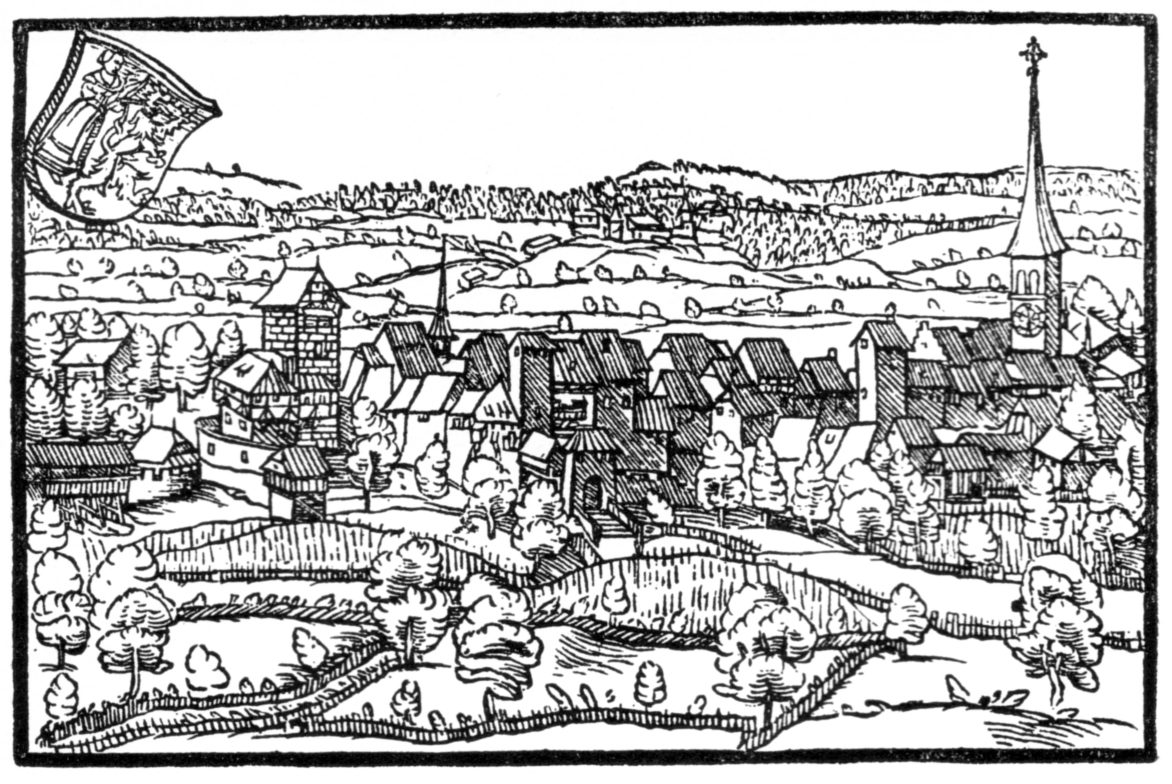
Frauenfeld in 1548

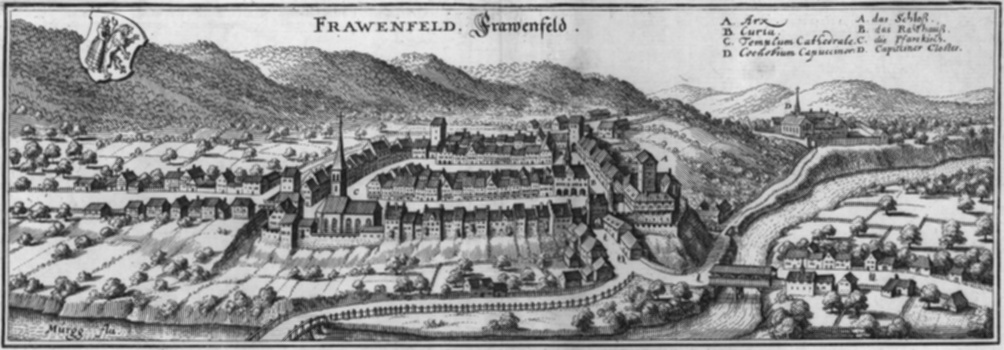
Frauenfeld in 1654, from the Topographia Helvetiae, Rhaetiae et Valesiae

Frauenfeld is first mentioned in 1246 as Vrowinvelt though it had been growing slowly during the second third of the 13th century. The village was inhabited by the knightly family of Hörigen (who were allied with Reichnau) and several other knightly families who were allied with the Habsburg and Kyburg families. In 1246 a knight with the last name/title zum Kyburger Umfeld is first mentioned in Frauenfeld. In the next three decades, several knights who came from the Kyburg lands, adopted the von Frauenfeld name. It is unclear whether the inhabitants of Frauenfeld Castle were simply the aristocratic owners of houses in Frauenfeld or the administrator of the bailiwick of Frauenfeld.

In 1286 Frauenfeld is first mentioned as a city. At least by that date, it had been integrated into the Habsburg territories. The tower was for a long time in the hands of the Knights of Frauenfeld-Wiesendangen. The political, social and economic background of becoming a city before 1286 are not clear: the relations of the early governors of Frauenfeld to the Kyburgs and Habsburgs are not clear. The Kyburgs did not hold sovereign rights in Frauenfled. It is therefore uncertain whether the city was founded by the Kyburgs really with the tacit approval of Reichenau, as was earlier believed. It is also conceivable that the castle and maybe a smaller surrounding village was built by a third party, perhaps a Toggenburg, of Murkart or Hagenbuch noble. If that was the case, as they lost influence in the 1220s in the lower Murgtal, the Kyburgs and later the Habsburgs expanded into the region and gained control of Reichenau's rights and castle.

The city was integrated into the Habsburg Amt of Kyburg. In 1374, the Habsburgs bestowed the right of judgment for all of Thurgau (which then included St. Gallen) on the Duke of Frauenfeld. In the 14th century the castle became the administrative center of the Habsburg Amt of Frauenfeld. As the Habsburgs sought to consolidate their position in the Thurgau, they granted the castle to one of the most important families of the Habsburg gentry, the Landsbergers. They held the position until 1534. Between 1415 and 1442 the city was under the auspices of an imperial provincial governor. After 1442 it temporarily fell back under Austrian control, then in 1460, the Thurgau (including Frauenfeld) was captured by the Swiss Confederation.

=== Part of the Swiss Confederation ===
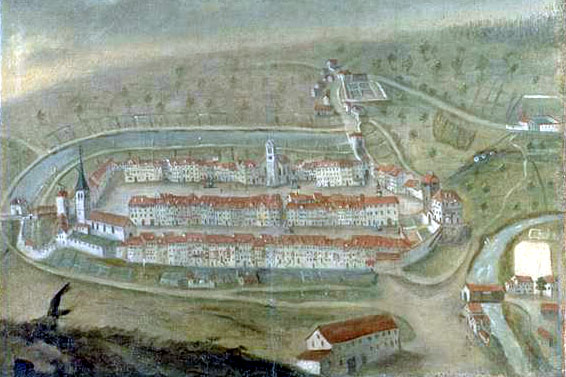
Frauenfeld before the fire of 1771

Frauenfeld had been a political center under the Austrian Habsburgs. Under the Confederation, it grew into the center from which the Confederates managed the entire Thurgau. Between 1500/15 and again in 1712, Frauenfeld was the site of the Tagsatzung assembly. After 1499 it was also the home of a Confederation court. After 1504 the city was the residence of Thurgau governor, and after 1532 he lived in the castle. Other locations were directly subordinate.

As the city grew in importance, the houses around the castle grew into a weakly fortified city. The city was separated by a wall and moat from the castle. The wooden houses were clustered around the two longitudinal and three cross streets, but a town square or other large, open space was missing. The castle and Niedertor (city gate) and the Strasshof dominated the southwest corner while the church and Oberturm (upper tower) were in the northwestern corner. The so-called Gachnanger Stock was in the northeast and the Spiegelhof with Holdertor (city gate) were in the southeast corner. In the 15th century the city was slowly fortified, but even in 1460 the outer rows of houses were not protected by city walls. In the 16th century most of the houses in the city were built from stone. The two city fires of 1771 and 1788 destroyed nearly all the houses, so that the current face of the old city dates from the end of the 18th century.

The Protestant Reformation affected the city. Although in 1531 only about 70 Catholics lived in the city, the Catholic Cantons helped administer Frauenfeld and the rest of the Thurgau. Catholic membership in the town council never fell below 33% and the two denominations alternated appointing mayors. For church affairs ever existed a Protestant and a Catholic Grand and Lesser Councils, which supervised the two schools in the city. The City Church and the Church in Oberkirch were initially shared churches. The Protestant pastor was appointed by the city's own Protestants after 1537. However, it wasn't until 1645 that the Protestants had their own church.

The castle of Frauenfeld is an example of late baroque and classical architecture. The Rathaus dates from Frauenfeld's second period of prominence in the 18th century. Starting in 1712, the gathering of Swiss Eidgenossen took place alternately in Frauenfeld and Baden. In 1742, this gathering took Frauenfeld as its regular meetingplace.

The fall of the old Old Swiss Confederacy in 1798 as a result of the French invasion brought an end to the gatherings in Frauenfeld.

=== End of the Ancien Régime ===
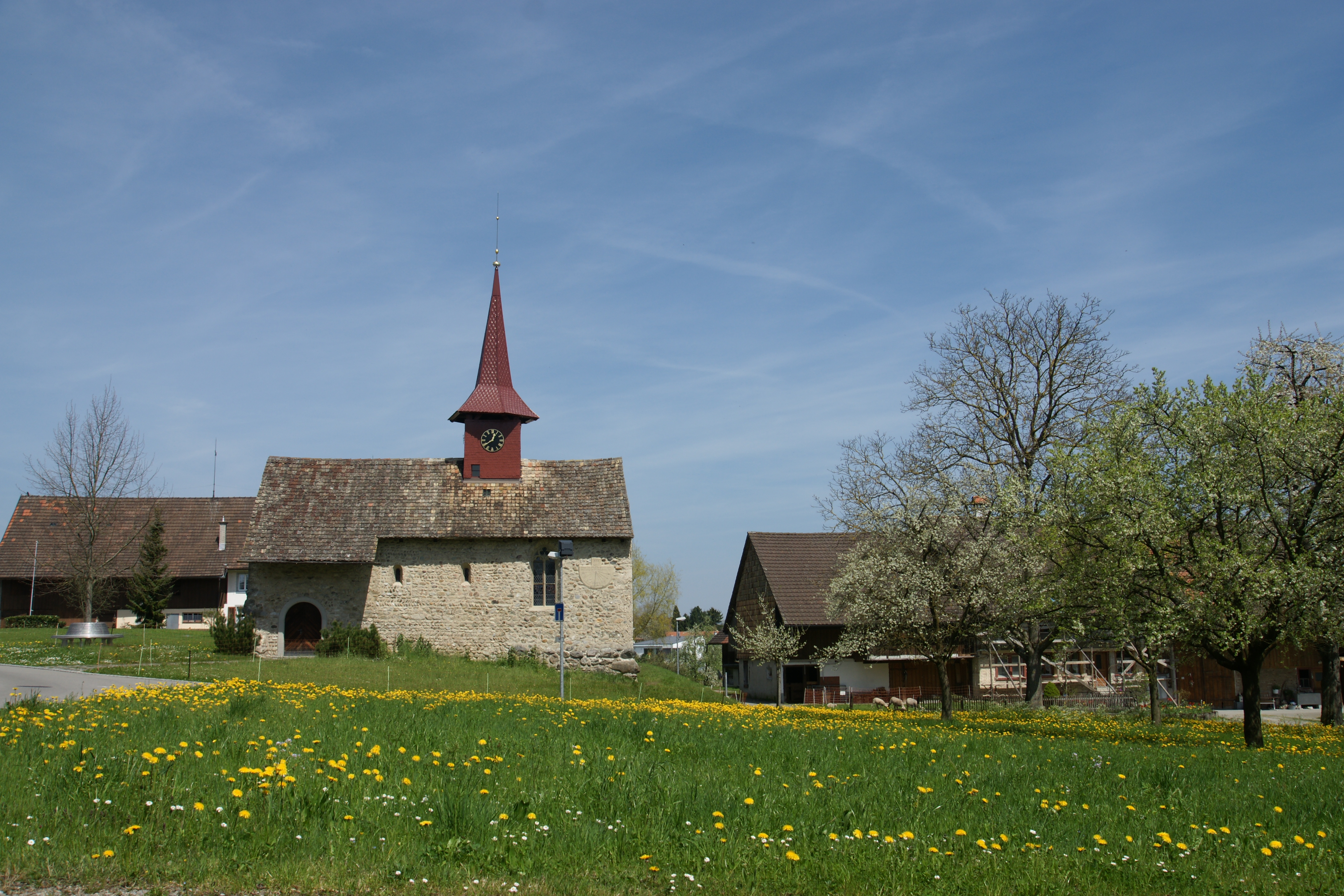
The village of Gerlikon joined Frauenfeld in 1998.

Aerial view from 800 m by Walter Mittelholzer (1929)

Following the French invasion of the Confederation, Thurgau was created as a full canton in the Helvetic Republic. The new constitution of 1798 established Frauenfeld as the capital of the new canton. However, the choice of Frauenfeld was controversial. Both the cities of Winterthur and Constance were considered, but the main alternative to Frauenfeld was Weinfelden. While Frauenfeld was near the border with Zürich, Weinfelden is located in the geographic center of the canton. Frauenfeld was the capital when Thurgau was under Confederation control, while Weinfelden was a leader in the Thurgau Freedom movement. While Frauenfeld eventually remained the capital, since 1832 the cantonal parliament has met semi-annually in Frauenfeld and Weinfelden.

On 25 May 1799, Frauenfeld became a battlefield when French and Austrian forces met there. While the Austrians were victorious, the city was recaptured by the French later in the year.

In 1800 the ability to move into the city was granted to anyone, and in 1807 the right to become a citizen was also opened to everyone. Between 1808 and 1834 the city walls were demolished. In 1807, the casino company was founded and in 1808 the businessman's society opened. In 1810, the Constable's association was re-established after it closed in 1798. In 1798 the Wochenblatt für den Kanton Thurgau (Weekly Journal for the canton of Thurgau) opened. In 1809 it changed its name to Thurgauer Zeitung, a paper that is still being published. Between 1813 and 1816, Bernhard Greuter, who had established a branch factory of the Islikoner Textilfärberei (Islikon textile dyeing factory) in Frauenfeld in 1805, had the moat filled in and created the promenade - a symbol of the establishment of a bourgeois public place in town.

In 1919, the municipalities of Langdorf, Kurzdorf, Huben, Herten, and Horgenbach became part of Frauenfeld. In 1998, Gerlikon, Schönenhof, and Zelgli were incorporated.

== Geography ==
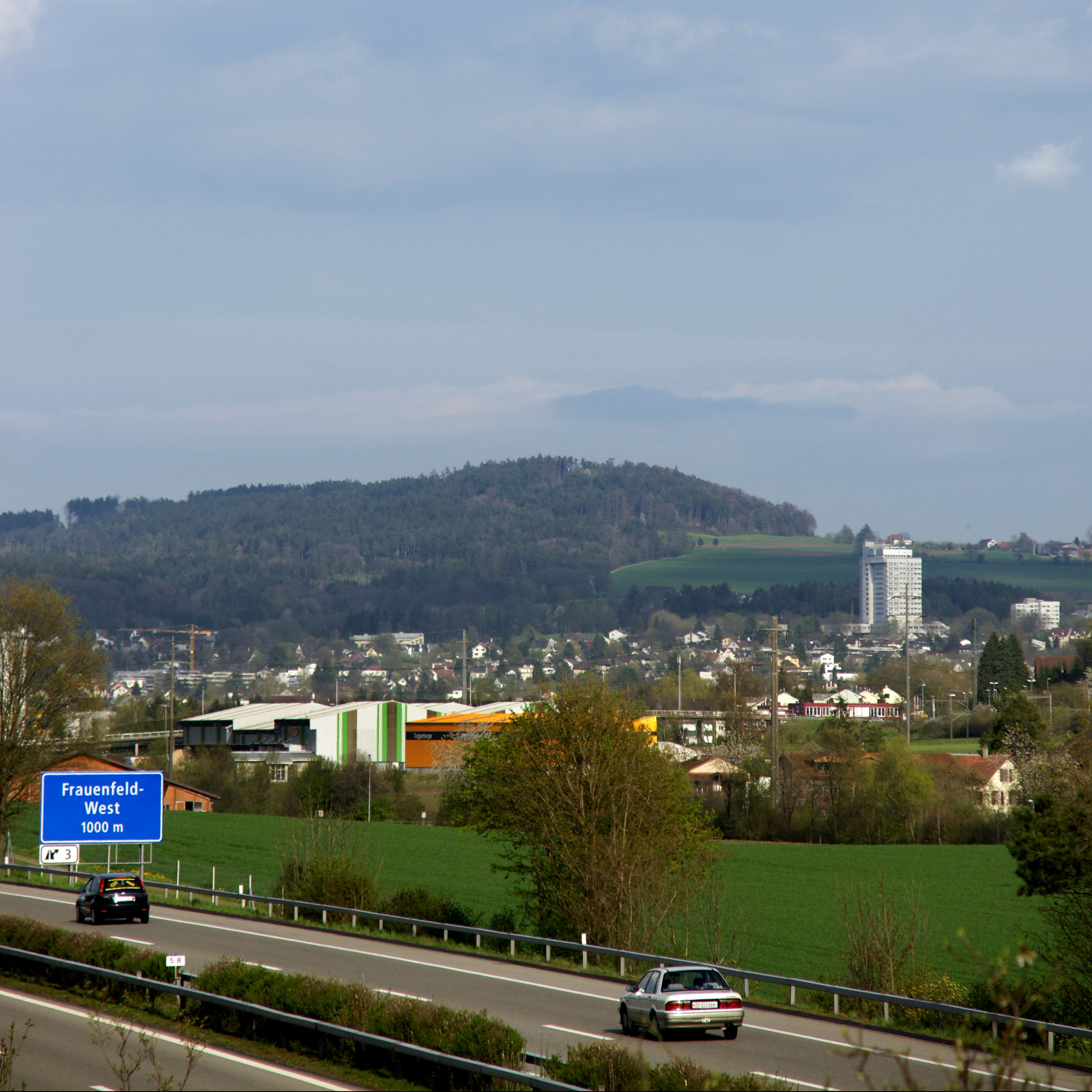
Frauenfeld from the west

Frauenfeld has an area, as of 2009, of 27.37 square kilometers (10.57 sq mi). Of this area, 12.43 km^{2} (4.80 sq mi) or 45.4% is used for agricultural purposes, while 6.77 km^{2} (2.61 sq mi) or 24.7% is forested. Of the rest of the land, 7.62 km^{2} (2.94 sq mi) or 27.8% is settled (buildings or roads), 0.28 km^{2} (0.11 sq mi) or 1.0% is either rivers or lakes and 0.28 km^{2} (0.11 sq mi) or 1.0% is unproductive land.

Of the built-up area, industrial buildings made up 13.3% of the total area while housing and buildings made up 3.5% and transportation infrastructure made up 0.8%. Power and water infrastructure as well as other special developed areas made up 2.3% of the area while parks, green belts and sports fields made up 7.9%. Out of the forested land, 22.6% of the total land area is heavily forested and 2.1% is covered with orchards or small clusters of trees. Of the agricultural land, 43.0% is used for growing crops, while 2.4% is used for orchards or vine crops. All the water in the municipality is flowing water.

The municipality is the cantonal and district capital. It is located along both banks of the Murg river. It consists of the town of Frauenfeld (made up of the old city, Ergaten-Vorstadt to the west and Obere Vorstadt to the east) and the former communities of Langdorf, Kurzdorf, Huben, Herten, Horgenbach, Gerlikon, Zelgli and Schönenhof.

== Demographics ==
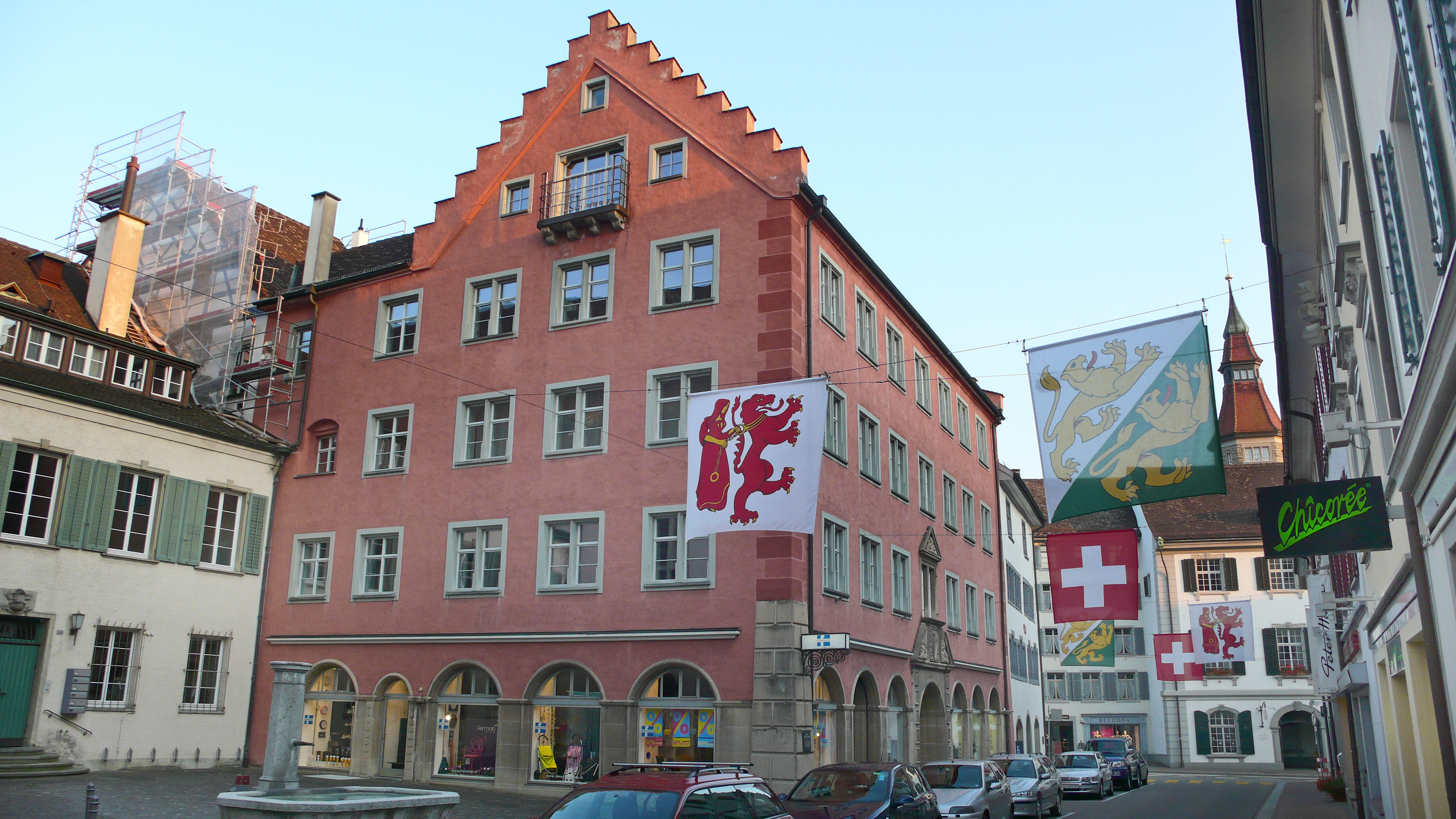
Haus zum Schwert in the old city of Frauenfeld

Frauenfeld has a population (as of December 2020) of 25,974. As of 2008, 22.3% of the population are foreign nationals. Over the last ten years (1997–2007) the population has changed at a rate of 10.8%. Most of the population (as of 2000) speaks German (83.3%), with Italian being second most common (4.7%) and Portuguese being third (3.7%).

As of 2008, the gender distribution of the population was 48.4% male and 51.6% female. The population was made up of 8,263 Swiss men (36.5% of the population), and 2,708 (11.9%) non-Swiss men. There were 9,338 Swiss women (41.2%), and 2,356 (10.4%) non-Swiss women.

In 2008 there were 143 live births to Swiss citizens and 59 births to non-Swiss citizens, and in same time span there were 200 deaths of Swiss citizens and 9 non-Swiss citizen deaths. Ignoring immigration and emigration, the population of Swiss citizens decreased by 57 while the foreign population increased by 50. There were 14 Swiss men who emigrated from Switzerland to another country, 25 Swiss women who emigrated from Switzerland to another country, 101 non-Swiss men who emigrated from Switzerland to another country and 105 non-Swiss women who emigrated from Switzerland to another country. The total Swiss population change in 2008 (from all sources) was an increase of 46 and the non-Swiss population change was an increase of 169 people. This represents a population growth rate of 1.0%.

The age distribution, as of 2009, in Frauenfeld is; 2,135 children or 9.3% of the population are between 0 and 9 years old and 2,488 teenagers or 10.9% are between 10 and 19. Of the adult population, 3,465 people or 15.1% of the population are between 20 and 29 years old. 3,048 people or 13.3% are between 30 and 39, 3,631 people or 15.9% are between 40 and 49, and 3,140 people or 13.7% are between 50 and 59. The senior population distribution is 2,360 people or 10.3% of the population are between 60 and 69 years old, 1,541 people or 6.7% are between 70 and 79, there are 899 people or 3.9% who are between 80 and 89, and there are 171 people or 0.7% who are 90 and older.

As of 2000, there were 9,569 private households in the municipality, and an average of 2.2 persons per household. In 2000 there were 2,272 single family homes (or 68.7% of the total) out of a total of 3,305 inhabited buildings. There were 263 two family buildings (8.0%), 132 three family buildings (4.0%) and 638 multi-family buildings (or 19.3%). There were 5,189 (or 23.6%) persons who were part of a couple without children, and 10,577 (or 48.2%) who were part of a couple with children. There were 1,346 (or 6.1%) people who lived in single parent home, while there are 126 persons who were adult children living with one or both parents, 101 persons who lived in a household made up of relatives, 239 who lived in a household made up of unrelated persons, and 772 who are either institutionalized or live in another type of collective housing.

The vacancy rate for the municipality, in 2008, was 1.15%. As of 2007, the construction rate of new housing units was 3.6 new units per 1000 residents. In 2000 there were 10,470 apartments in the municipality. The most common apartment size was the 4 room apartment of which there were 3,198. There were 537 single room apartments and 1,091 apartments with six or more rooms. As of 2000 the average price to rent an average apartment in Frauenfeld was 1087.26 Swiss francs (CHF) per month (US$870, £490, €700 approx. exchange rate from 2000). The average rate for a one-room apartment was 508.43 CHF (US$410, £230, €330), a two-room apartment was about 761.63 CHF (US$610, £340, €490), a three-room apartment was about 960.43 CHF (US$770, £430, €610) and a six or more room apartment cost an average of 1936.19 CHF (US$1550, £870, €1240). The average apartment price in Frauenfeld was 97.4% of the national average of 1116 CHF.

In the 2007 federal election the most popular party was the SVP which received 34.4% of the vote. The next three most popular parties were the SP (15.55%), the CVP (15.03%) and the FDP (13.5%). In the federal election, a total of 7,105 votes were cast, and the voter turnout was 48.5%.

== Historical population ==
The historical population is given in the following table:

year	population	% German Speaking	% Italian Speaking	% Other Languages	% Protestant	% Catholic	% Jewish	% Muslim	% No Specific Religion	% Swiss	% Non-Swiss
Middle Ages	80-120 Houses										
1443	113 Taxable Households										
1850	3,444	-	-	-	82.6%	17.4%	-	-	-	95.4%	4.6%
1870	5,122	-	-	-	78.7%	21.1%	-	-	-	93.3%	7.0%
1888	5,996	99.0%	0.5%	0.5%	74.1%	25.3%	0.1%	-	-	90.0%	10.0%
1900	7,761	96.3%	2.7%	1.0%	71.7%	28.2%	0.1%	-	-	84.5%	15.5%
1910	8,459	95.1%	3.9%	1.0%	70.7%	28.1%	0.1%	-	-	84.3%	15.7%
1930	8,795	96.9%	2.1%	1.0%	71.2%	28.1%	0.1%	-	-	90.3%	9.7%
1950	11,114	94.8%	3.6%	1.6%	67.9%	31.2%	0.1%	-	-	93.4%	6.6%
1970	17,576	81.3%	14.1%	4.6%	55.1%	43.0%	0.1%	0.5%	0.4%	78.3%	21.7%
1990	20,204	81.1%	7.5%	11.4%	49.1%	41.5%	0.1%	2.5%	4.0%	77.4%	22.6%
2000	21,954	83.3%	4.7%	11.9%	44.3%	37.5%	0.5%	4.8%	7.2%	75.7%	24.3%

== Heritage sites of national significance ==
There are ten buildings that are listed as Swiss heritage site of national significance in Frauenfeld. There are four archives and a library on the list; archive of the Amtes für Denkmalpflege, the archive of the Department of Archeology, the Citizen's Archive of Frauenfeld, the State Archives of the Canton and Cantonal Library. The Catholic City Church and the Simultaneum Church of St Laurenzen with St Anna Chapel and Messmerhaus are the two religious buildings on the list. Two museums, the Museum of Archeology and Natural History of the Canton of Thurgau and Frauenfeld Castle which contains the Historical Museum, are on the list. The last building on the list is the Rathaus or town council house. The entire old city of Frauenfeld is included in the Inventory of Swiss Heritage Sites.

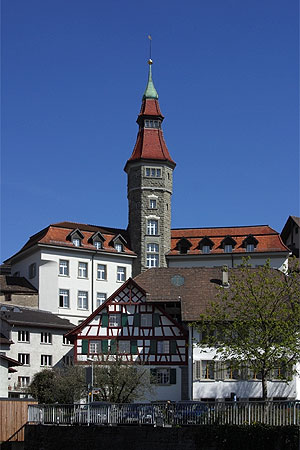
Frauenfeld city hall

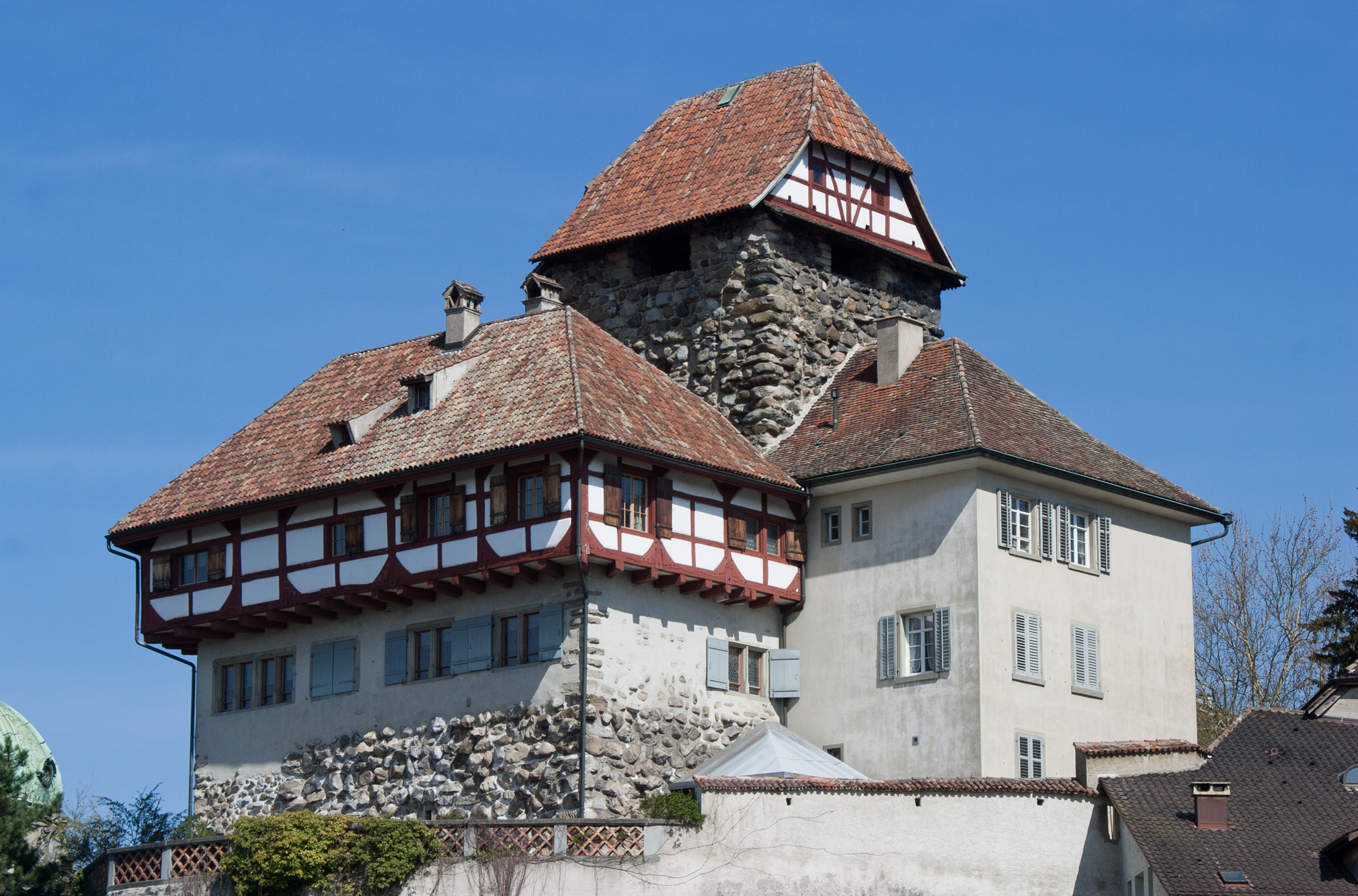
Frauenfeld Castle

== Economy ==
In 2007, Frauenfeld had an unemployment rate of 2.01%. As of 2005, there were 211 people employed in the primary economic sector and about 70 businesses involved in this sector. 4,120 people are employed in the secondary sector and there are 228 businesses in this sector. 11,759 people are employed in the tertiary sector, with 1,095 businesses in this sector.

In 2000 there were 15,112 workers who lived in the municipality. Of these, 4,752 or about 31.4% of the residents worked outside Frauenfeld while 8,298 people commuted into the municipality for work. There were a total of 18,658 jobs (of at least 6 hours per week) in the municipality. Of the working population, 16.4% used public transportation to get to work, and 42.7% used a private car.

== Industry and business ==
The headquarters of Sigg are located in Frauenfeld.

== Religion ==
From the 2000 census, 8,239 or 37.5% were Roman Catholic, while 9,255 or 42.2% belonged to the Swiss Reformed Church. Of the rest of the population, there were 18 Old Catholics (or about 0.08% of the population) who belonged to the Christian Catholic Church of Switzerland, there are 337 individuals (or about 1.54% of the population) who belong to the Orthodox Church, and there are 486 individuals (or about 2.21% of the population) who belong to another Christian church. There were 18 individuals (or about 0.08% of the population) who were Jewish, and 1,043 (or about 4.75% of the population) who are Islamic. There are 160 individuals (or about 0.73% of the population) who belong to a church not listed on the census. There were 1,585 (or about 7.22% of the population) who belong to no church, are agnostic or atheist, and 813 individuals (or about 3.70% of the population) who did not answer the question.

== Weather ==
Frauenfeld has an average of 133 days of rain or snow per year and on average receives 1,072 mm (42.2 in) of precipitation. The wettest month is June during which time Frauenfeld receives an average of 127 mm (5.0 in) of rain or snow. During this month there is precipitation for an average of 12.5 days. The month with the most days of precipitation is May, with an average of 13, but with only 107 mm (4.2 in) of rain or snow. The driest month of the year is March with an average of 68 mm (2.7 in) of precipitation over 12.5 days.

== Education ==
In Frauenfeld about 68.8% of the population (between age 25–64) have completed either non-mandatory upper secondary education or additional higher education (either university or a Fachhochschule). Frauenfeld is home to the Kantonsbibliothek Thurgau library. The library has (as of 2008) 276,628 books or other media, and loaned out 163,766 items in the same year. It was open a total of 256 days with average of 47 hours per week during that year.

== Transportation ==
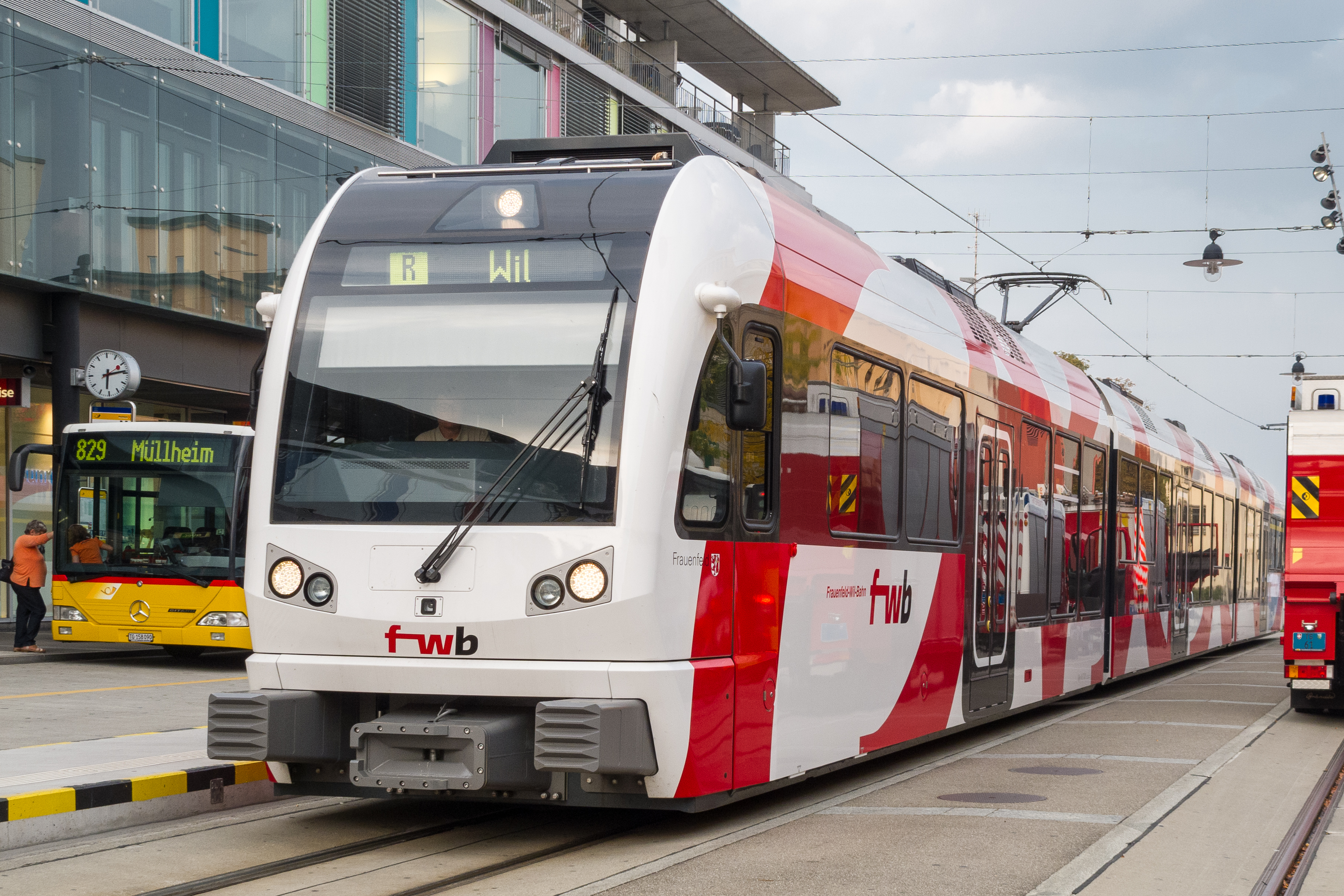
Public transportation by train and bus at Bahnhofplatz

Frauenfeld is a central location in western Thurgau and is served by a railway station and two exits on the A7 motorway.

It has a town bus service with 5 bus lines which run every 15 minutes to every corner of the town. Frauenfeld railway station supports a regional train, part of the Zürich S-Bahn, from Weinfelden to Winterthur (S8 and S30) every 30 minutes, as well in the opposite direction and a fast train (InterCity and InterRegio) that travels to Zürich every 30 minutes, as well in the opposite direction to Weinfelden and further to Constance in Germany or Romanshorn. During busy times in the mornings and evenings these trains are supported by another train (called "S") which stops in the bigger towns (like IR/IC).

The nearest airport to Frauenfeld is Zurich Airport, which is located 28 km (17 mi) to the west of Frauenfeld.

Frauenfeld is also the northern terminus of the narrow-gauge Frauenfeld–Wil Railway; trains operate from the Bahnhofplatz in front of the main railway station. Trains operate over this line to Wil every half hour. There are plans to increase the frequency to every fifteen minutes. Services on this line, designated as S15 of the St. Gallen S-Bahn, also stop at Frauenfeld Marktplatz and Lüdem.

== Twin towns ==
Frauenfeld is twinned with the town of

- Kufstein, Tyrol, Austria

== Notable people ==
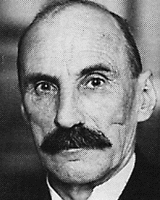
Heinrich Häberlin

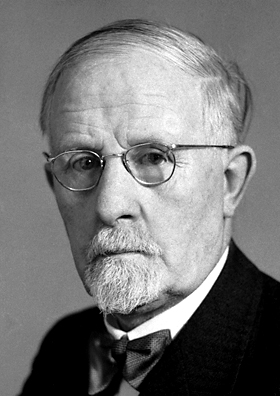
Walter Hess, 1949

- Petrus Dasypodius (ca.1495–1559), author and humanist, teacher and pastor in Zürich
- Conrad Dasypodius (1532–1600), writer and professor of mathematics in Strasbourg, Alsace
- Pierre-Gustave Joly de Lotbinière (1798–1865), a French businessman and amateur daguerreotypist
- Johann Kaspar Mörikofer (1799–1877), a literary and ecclesiastical historian
- Julius Maggi (1846–1912), an entrepreneur, inventor of precooked soups and Maggi sauce
- Otto Stoll (1849–1922), a linguist and ethnologist, researched Mayan languages
- Alfred Ilg (1854–1916), an engineer and confidant to Ethiopian Emperor Menelik II
- Heinrich Häberlin (1868–1947), a politician, judge and member of the Swiss Federal Council 1920–1934
- Walter Rudolf Hess (1881–1973), a physiologist who won the Nobel Prize in Physiology or Medicine in 1949 for mapping the areas of the brain involved in the control of internal organs
- René Hubert (1895–1976), a costume designer, nominated for two Academy Awards
- Konrad Osterwalder (1942–2025), a mathematician and physicist, held UN posts, known for the Osterwalder–Schrader theorem
- Ulrich Gasser (born 1950), a flautist and composer
- Hansjörg Walter (born 1951), a politician, member of the Swiss National Council 1999–2017
- Lieutenant-General Roland Nef (born 1959), the Chief of the Swiss Armed Forces in 2008
- Alfred Kramer (born 1965), a Swiss/Italian jazz drummer
- Hilaria Kramer (born 1967), a modern jazz musician (trumpet, song and composition)

=== Sport ===
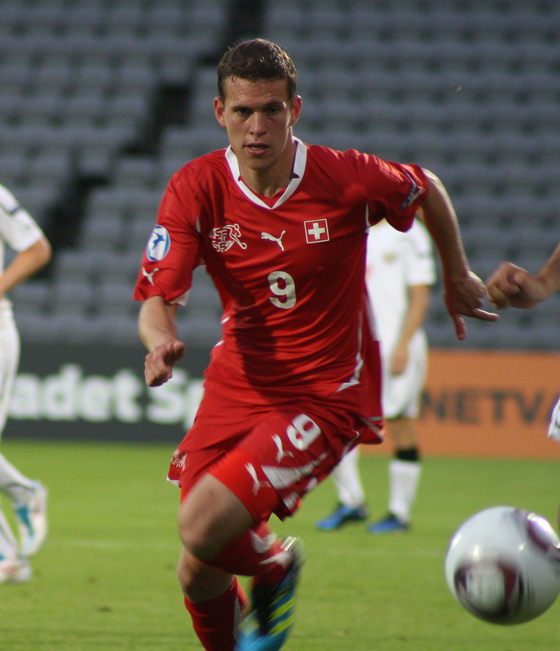
Fabian Frei, 2011

- Walter Reiser (born 1923), a cyclist, competed in the 1948 Summer Olympics
- Rolf Bernhard (born 1949), a retired long jumper, competed in the 1972, 1976 and 1980 Summer Olympics
- Pascal Zuberbühler (born 1971), a former football goalkeeper, currently goalkeeper coach for Derby County F.C.
- Patrick Heuscher (born 1976), a beach volleyball player, bronze medallist at the 2004 Summer Olympics also competed in the 2008 and 2012 Summer Olympics
- Reto Hollenstein (born 1985), a racing cyclist, rode in the 2014 Tour de France
- Fabian Frei (born 1989), a footballer, over 300 club caps and 14 for Switzerland
- Alessandro Hämmerle (born 1993), a Swiss-born Austrian snowboarder, competed at the 2014 Winter Olympics
- Antonio Djakovic (born 2002), a swimmer, competed at the 2020 Summer Olympics
