= List of Christian monasteries in Switzerland =

This is a list of current and former Christian religious houses in Switzerland for either men or women.

== A ==
- All Saints Abbey (Kloster Allerheiligen) (dissolved), at Schaffhausen: Benedictine monks (1049/50-1529)
- Au Abbey (Kloster Au or Kloster in der Au), at Trachslau near Einsiedeln (Schwyz): initially 4 independent women's communities first documented in 1359; became a single community in Vordere Au c.1530; became Benedictine nuns in 1617 under Einsiedeln Abbey; raised to the status of abbey in 1984; extant
- Ayent Priory (Prieuré d'Ayent, Prieuré de Saint-Romain) (dissolved), at Ayent (Valais): Benedictine monks (before 1107-1620)

== B ==
- Baulmes Priory (Prieuré de Baulmes, Prieuré Saint-Marie, Prieuré Notre-Dame et Saint-Michel) (dissolved) at Baulmes (Vaud): Rule of St. Columbanus, later Benedictine monks (652-before 1123); Cluniacs (before 1123-1536/37)
- Beerenberg Abbey or Mariazell Abbey (Kloster Mariazell am Beerenberg) (dissolved), at Wülflingen (Winterthur): hermitage (1318-1355); Franciscan friars (1355–65); Augustinian Canons (1365-1527/28)
- Beinwil Abbey (Kloster Beinwil) (dissolved), at Beinwil (Solothurn): Benedictine monks (1085-1554)
- Bellelay Abbey (Abbaye de Bellelay) (dissolved), at Bellelay (Bern): Premonstratensians (1136-1797)
- Bellerive Abbey (Abbaye de Bellerive) (dissolved), at Collonge-Bellerive (Geneva): Cistercian nuns (1150-c.1542)
- Bellevaux Abbey (Abbaye de Bellevaux) (dissolved), at Lausanne (Vaud): Cistercian nuns (founded 1267/68; Cistercian from 1274x1293-1536)
- Bellinzona (Ticino):
  - Collegiate church (founded before 1168; extant)
  - Augustinian Canons (1444/45-1811/12)
  - Santa Maria della Grazie: Franciscan friars (1481x83-1848)
  - Jesuits (1646-1675)
  - Benedictine priory: monks (1675-1852)
  - Ursuline nuns (1730-1848)
- Benken Abbey (Kloster Benken) (dissolved), at Benken (St. Gallen): monks of unknown order, possibly Benedictine (before 741-mid/late 9th century)
- Berlai Priory or Mont-Berlai Priory (Prieuré de Berlai, Prieuré Sainte-Marie-Madeleine de Berlai) (dissolved), at Avenches (Vaud): Benedictine monks (founded before 1134; deserted by 1216)
- Blonay Priory (Prieuré de Blonay) (dissolved), at Blonay (Vaud): Benedictine monks (before 1210-1536)
- Bollingen Priory (Kloster Bollingen) (dissolved), at Bollingen (St. Gallen): Cistercian nuns, later Premonstratensian nuns (founded shortly after 1229; dissolved 1267)
- Bonmont Abbey (Abbaye de Bonmont) (dissolved), at Chéserex (Vaud): Cistercian monks (1110x20-1536)
- Bremgarten (Aargau):
  - Capuchin friary, Bremgarten (dissolved): Capuchins (1617-1841)
  - St. Clare's Priory, Bremgarten (Frauenkloster St. Klara) (dissolved): Beguines (before 1406); Franciscan Tertiaries (1406-1798)
- Broc Priory (Prieuré de Broc) (dissolved), at Broc (Fribourg): Benedictine monks (before 1228-1577)
- Bubikon Commandery (Kommende Bubikon) (dissolved), at Bubikon (Zürich): Knights Hospitallers (1184x1198-1789)
- Burier Priory (Prieuré de Burier) (dissolved), at Montreux (Vaud): Benedictine monks (before 1163-1536)

== C ==
- Cappel, see Kappel
- Cazis Priory, at Cazis (Grisons): canonesses or nuns (late 7th or early 8th century-1156); Augustinian canonesses (1156-1570); Dominican nuns (from 1647; extant)
- Claro Abbey (Santa Maria Assunta di Claro), at Claro (Ticino): Benedictine nuns (founded 1490; extant)
- Churwalden Abbey at Churwalden (Grisons): Premonstratensian monks (founded around 1150; dissolved 1803/07)
- Collombey Abbey (Abbaye Saint-Joseph d'Arbignon), at Collombey-Muraz (Valais): Reformed Bernardine nuns (founded here 1647; extant)
- Cossonay Priory (Prieuré de Cossonay) (dissolved), at Cossonay (Vaud): Benedictine monks (first half of the 11th century-1672)

== D ==
- Disentis Abbey at Disentis/Mustér (Grisons): Benedictine monks (founded mid-8th century; extant)

== E ==
- Ebersecken Abbey, later Priory (Kloster Ebersecken; Luther Thal) at Willisau (Lucerne): Cistercian nuns (1274/75-1588x1594)
- Einsiedeln Abbey (Kloster Einsiedeln) at Einsiedeln (Schwyz): Benedictine monks (founded c 900; extant)
- Engelberg Abbey (Kloster Engelberg) at Engelberg (Obwalden): Benedictine monks (founded 1120; extant)

(originally a double monastery; see Sarnen for the nunnery formerly part of Engelberg)

- Engental Priory (Kloster Engental) at Muttenz (Basel-Land): Cistercian nuns (before 1450-1534)
- Erlach Abbey, also known as St. Johannsen Abbey (Kloster Erlach or Abtei St. Johannsen; dedicated to Saint John the Baptist) (dissolved), at Gals (Bern): Benedictine monks (1093x1103-1528)
- Eschenbach Abbey (Kloster Eschenbach), at Eschenbach (Lucerne): Augustinian nuns (1292/1309-1588); Cistercian nuns (from 1588; extant)

== F ==
- Fahr Priory at Unterengstringen (Zürich) / Würenlos (Aargau): Benedictine nuns
- Feldbach Abbey or Priory (dissolved) at Steckbach (Thurgau): Cistercian nuns
- Abbaye de la Fille-Dieu at Romont (Fribourg): Cistercian nuns; Trappists
- Fischingen Priory, formerly Fischingen Abbey, at Fischingen (Thurgau): Benedictine monks
- Fontaine-André Abbey at Neuchâtel: Premonstratensians
- Fraubrunnen Abbey (dissolved) at Fraubrunnen (Bern): Cistercian nuns
- Frauenthal Abbey at Cham (Zug): Cistercian nuns
- Fraumünster Abbey: see Zürich
- Frienisberg Abbey (dissolved) at Seedorf (Bern): Cistercian monks

== G ==
- Genolier Priory (dissolved) at Genolier (Vaud): Benedictine monks
- Géronde Charterhouse (dissolved) at Sierre (Valais): Carthusians
- Glattburg Abbey aka St. Gallenberg Abbey at Oberbüren (St. Gallen): Benedictine nuns
- Gnadenthal Abbey (dissolved) at Niederwil (Aargau): Cistercian nuns
- Gottstatt Abbey (dissolved) at Orpund (Bern): Premonstratensians
- Community of Grandchamp at Boudry (Neuchâtel): Protestants
- Grandgourt Abbey at Grandgourt (Jura): Premonstratensians
- Great St. Bernard Hospice on the Great St Bernard Pass: Augustinian Canons
- Grimmenstein monastery: Third Order of Saint Francis nuns in Appenzell Innerrhoden
- Gubel, see Maria Hilf

== H ==
- Haut-Crêt Abbey (dissolved) at Les Tavernes (Vaud): Cistercian monks
- Hauterive Abbey at Posieux (Fribourg): Cistercian monks
- Hermetschwil Abbey at Hermetschwil-Staffeln (Aargau): Benedictine nuns
- Herzogenbuchsee Priory (dissolved) at Herzogenbuchsee (Bern): Benedictine monks
- Humilimont Abbey at Marsens (Fribourg): Premonstratensians

== I ==
- Dominican Convent, at Ilanz (Grisons): Dominican Sisters
- Château d'Illens at Rossens (Fribourg): displaced French Trappist monks from Laval 1903-14
- In der Au, see Au Abbey
- Interlaken Monastery (dissolved) at Interlaken (Bern): Augustinian Canons Regulars
- Ittingen Charterhouse at Warth (Thurgau): Carthusians

== J ==
- Jonschwil Abbey or Priory (dissolved) at Jonschwil (St. Gall): Benedictine monks

== K ==
- Kalchrain Priory or Abbey (dissolved) at Hüttwilen (Thurgau): Cistercian nuns
- Kappel Abbey (sometimes Cappel Abbey) (dissolved) at Kappel am Albis (Zürich): Cistercian monks
- Kleinlützel Priory (dissolved) at Kleinlützel (Solothurn): women religious, possibly Cistercian nuns; Augustinian Canons; Augustinian Canonesses
- Klingental Priory (dissolved) in Basel: Dominican friars
- Klingenzell Priory (dissolved) at Mammern (Thurgau): Benedictine monks
- Klingnau Commandery (dissolved) at Klingnau (Aargau): Knights Hospitallers
- Königsfelden Abbey (dissolved) at Windisch (Aargau): Franciscans and Poor Clares
- Kreuzlingen Abbey (dissolved) at Kreuzlingen: Augustinian Canons
- Küsnacht Priory or Commandery (Johanniterhaus Küsnacht) (dissolved) at Küsnacht (Zürich): Knights Hospitallers (1373-1531)

== L ==
- La Lance Charterhouse (dissolved) at Concise, (Vaud): Carthusians
- Lac de Joux Abbey at L'Abbaye (Vaud): Premonstratensians
- Le Lieu (Vaud): monastery of unknown rule, possibly a hermitage
- Lucerne:
  - Lucerne Abbey: Benedictine monks
  - Franciscan friary, Lucerne
- Lully Priory (dissolved) at Bernex (Geneva): Benedictine monks
- Lutry Priory (dissolved) at Lutry (Vaud): Benedictine monks
- Lützelau Abbey or Priory (dissolved) on Lützelau island, Freienbach (Schwyz): nuns, order unknown

== M ==
- Magdenau Abbey at Wolfertswil, Degersheim (St. Gallen): Cistercian nuns
- La Maigrauge Abbey / Magerau Abbey (Fribourg): Cistercian nuns
- Mariaberg Abbey (St. Gallen): Built as a replacement for Abbey of St. Gall, destroyed before completion in Rorschacher Klosterbruch (1489), rebuilt as an administrative center
- Maria Hilf, on the Gubel, Menzingen (Zug): Capuchin Sisters
- Maria-Rickenbach at Niederrickenbach (Nidwalden): Benedictine nuns
- Mariastein Abbey, also known as Beinwil-Mariastein Abbey, at Metzerlen-Mariastein (Solothurn): Benedictine monks
- Mariazell, see Beerenberg
- Mariazell-Wurmsbach Abbey, see Wurmsbach
- Melchtal Abbey at Kerns (Obwalden): Benedictine nuns
- Mistail Abbey (dissolved) at Alvaschein (Grisons): Benedictine nuns
- Montheron Abbey (dissolved) at Montheron in Froideville near Lausanne (Vaud): Cistercian monks
- Mount Zion Abbey (Stift Berg Sion) at Gommiswald (St. Gallen): Premonstratensian nuns
- Moutier-Grandval Abbey (dissolved) in Moutier (Bern): Benedictine monks
- Münchenbuchsee Commandery (dissolved) at Münchenbuchsee (Bern): Knights Hospitallers
- Münchenwiler Priory (dissolved) at Münchenwiler Castle (Bern): Cluniacs
- Münsterlingen at Landschlacht (Thurgau): Benedictine nuns
- Muri Abbey at Muri (Aargau) (dissolved): Benedictine monks

== N ==
- Notkersegg Convent (Kloster Notkersegg) at St. Gallen: Capuchin nuns
- Nyon Abbey or Priory at Nyon (Vaud): Benedictine monks

== O ==
- Oetenbach Priory, Lindenhof: see Zürich
- Olsberg Abbey (Stift Olsberg) (dissolved) at Olsberg (Aargau): Cistercian nuns
- Oujon Charterhouse (dissolved) at Arzier (Vaud): Carthusians

== P ==
- Paradise Priory (Kloster Paradies) (dissolved) at Schlatt (Thurgau): Poor Clares
- La Part-Dieu Charterhouse (dissolved) at Gruyères or La Tour-de-Trême (Fribourg): Carthusians
- Perroy Priory (dissolved) at Perroy (Vaud): Benedictine monks
- Peterlingen Priory (dissolved) at Payerne (Vaud): Cluniacs
- Pfäfers Abbey (dissolved) at Pfäfers (St. Gallen): Benedictine monks
- Posat Priory or Abbey at Posat (Fribourg): Trappist monks
- Predigerkloster, Neumarkt: see Zürich

== R ==
- Rathausen Abbey or Priory (dissolved) at Ebikon (Lucerne): Cistercian nuns
- Capuchin Friary, Rapperswil, at Rapperswil (St. Gall): Capuchin friars
- Rheinau Abbey (dissolved) at Rheinau (Zürich): Benedictines
- Romainmôtier Abbey (dissolved) at Romainmôtier-Envy (Vaud): Premonstratensian canons
- Rüeggisberg Priory (dissolved) at Rüeggisberg (Bern): Cluniacs
- Rüegsau Abbey (dissolved) at Rüegsau (Bern): Benedictine nuns
- Rueyres Priory at Chardonne (Vaud): Premonstratensian nuns
- Rüti Monastery (dissolved) at Rüti (Zürich): Premonstratensians

== S ==
- St. Agnes' Abbey at Schaffhausen: Benedictine nuns
- St. Alban's Abbey, later St. Alban's Priory, (dissolved) in Basel: Benedictines, later Cluniacs
- St. Andrew's Abbey, Sarnen, see Sarnen
- St. Benedict's Abbey, Port-Valais, at Le Bouveret (Valais): Benedictines
- St. Bernard Hospice, see Great St Bernard Hospice
- St. Blaise's Priory (dissolved) at Basel: Benedictine monks
- St. Blaise's Priory, Stampfenbach (St. Blasianer Propstei Stampfenbach), Stampfenbach in Zürich: Benedictine monks
- St. Christopher's Abbey or Priory (dissolved) near Aclens (Vaud): Benedictine monks
- St. Gall's Abbey (dissolved) at St. Gallen: Benedictine monks
- St. Gallenberg Abbey, see Glattburg Abbey
- St. George's Abbey, Stein am Rhein, (dissolved) at Stein am Rhein (Schaffhausen): Benedictine monks
- St. Imier's Abbey (dissolved) at St. Imier (Bern): Benedictine monks, later men's collegiate foundation (Herrenstift)
- St. Jacob's Abbey im Prättigau at Klosters (Grisons): Premonstratensians
- St. John's Abbey in the Thurtal (dissolved) at Alt St. Johann, later Nesslau (St. Gallen): Benedictine monks
- St. John's Abbey, Geneva, (dissolved) at Geneva: Benedictine monks
- St. John's Abbey, Müstair, (dissolved) at Müstair (Grisons): Benedictine nuns
- St. Margaretenthal Charterhouse (dissolved) in Basel: Carthusians
- St. Martin's Abbey, Fluntern (dissolved) Fluntern, Zürich: Augustinian Canons (1127-1525)
- St. Maurice's Abbey at Saint-Maurice (Valais): Augustinian Canons
- St. Otmarsberg Abbey, also known as Uznach Abbey, at Uznach (St. Gallen): Missionary Benedictines
- St. Peter's Island (dissolved) small priory near Erlach (Bern): Cluniac monks
- St. Peterzell Priory (dissolved) at St. Peterzell (St. Gallen): Benedictine monks
- Saint-Pierre-de-Clages Priory at Saint-Pierre-de-Clages, Chamoson (Valais): Benedictine monks (12th century to 1580); Trappist monks (1793-96)
- Saint-Pierre du Mont-Joux Hospice (dissolved) at Bourg-St-Pierre (Valais): unknown
- St. Sulpice's Priory at Saint-Sulpice (Vaud): Benedictine or Cluniac monks
- St. Urban's Abbey (dissolved) at Sankt Urban or Pfaffnau (Lucerne): Cistercian monks
- St. Ursanne's Abbey (dissolved) at Saint-Ursanne (Jura): Rule of St. Columbanus, later Benedictine monks, later a college of secular canons
- St. Wiborada's Priory (dissolved) at St. Georgen in St. Gallen: Benedictine nuns
- Sarnen Abbey, St. Andrew's Abbey, Sarnen, or Engelberg-Sarnen, formerly the nunnery of the double monastery at Engelberg, (extant) at Sarnen (Obwalden): Benedictine nuns
- Schänis Abbey (dissolved) at Schänis (St. Gallen): women's collegiate foundation (Damenstift)
- Schönenwerd Priory (dissolved) at Schönenwerd (Solothurn): unknown rule; later a men's collegiate foundation (Herrenstift)
- Schönthal Abbey, Basel, (dissolved) in Langenbruck (Basel): Benedictine nuns
- Selnau Abbey: see Zürich
- Sembrancher Abbey at Vollèges (Valais): Trappist monks and nuns
- Sion Priory or Abbey near Klingnau (Aargau): Benedictine monks
- Simplon Hospice on the Simplon Pass: Augustinian Canons
- Steinen Priory (Kloster in der Au, Kloster Steinen) (dissolved) at Steinen (Schwyz): Cistercian nuns (mid-13th century–early-mid 16th century); Dominican nuns (1575–1640)

== T ==
- Tänikon Abbey (dissolved) at Aadorf (Aargau): Cistercian nuns
- Tedlingen Priory or Abbey at Radelfingen (Bern): Cistercian nuns
- Töss Monastery at Töss, now part of Winterthur (Zürich): Dominican nuns
- Thorberg Charterhouse (dissolved) at Schloss Thorberg, Krauchthal (Bern): Carthusians
- Thunstetten Priory or Commandery (Johanniterkommende Thunstetten), Thunstetten (Bern): Knights Hospitallers (1192–1528)
- Tobel Priory or Commandery (Johanniterkommende Tobel) (dissolved), Tobel-Tägerschen (Thurgau): Knights Hospitallers (1228–1809)
- Trub Abbey (dissolved) at Trub (Bern): Benedictines

== U ==
- Uznach Abbey, see St. Otmarsberg Abbey

== V ==
- Val de la Paix Charterhouse (dissolved) at Chandossel or Villarepos (Fribourg): Carthusians
- La Valsainte Charterhouse at Cerniat (Fribourg): Carthusians, later Trappists
- Vautravers Priory (serene chapel) at Môtiers (Neuchâtel): Benedictine monks and Nuns
- Vermes Priory (dissolved) at Vermes (Jura): unknown
- Villarvolard Abbey or Priory (Fribourg): Trappist nuns
- La Voix-Dieu Abbey or Priory at Plasselb (Fribourg): Cistercian nuns

== W ==
- Wagenhausen Priory (dissolved) at Wagenhausen (Thurgau): Benedictine monks
- Wangen Abbey or Priory (dissolved) at Wangen an der Aare (Bern): Benedictine monks
- Weesen Nunnery at Weesen (St. Gallen): Dominican nuns
- Werd Friary, formerly Werd Abbey, at Eschenz (Thurgau): Franciscans, formerly Benedictines
- Wettingen Abbey at Wettingen (Aargau): Cistercian monks
- Widlisbach Abbey or Priory at Rüttenen (Solothurn): Trappist monks
- Wislikofen Priory (dissolved) at Wislikofen (Aargau): Benedictine monks
- Wonnenstein Friary at Teufen (Appenzell-Ausserrhoden): Capuchin friars
- Wurmsbach Abbey at Bollingen (St. Gallen): Cistercian nuns

== Z ==
- Zürich:
  - Fraumünster Abbey: Benedictine nuns (853 – 1524)
  - Barfüsserkloster Zürich: Franciscan friary (c.1253 – 1524)
  - Augustinerkloster Zürich: priory of Augustinian friars (c.1270 – 1524)
  - Predigerkloster Zürich, Neumarkt: priory of Dominican friars (c.1234 – 1524)
  - Community of St. Verena: Beguines (mid-13th century – 1524)
  - Oetenbach Priory, Lindenhof: convent of Dominican nuns (c.1237 – 1525)
  - St. Martin's Priory, Fluntern, also known as Zürichberg Priory (Kloster auf dem Zürichberg): Augustinian Canons (1127 – 1523 or 1525)
  - Selnau Abbey: Cistercian nuns (under the Rule of St Augustine 1256-59; Cistercian 1259 – 1525)
- Zurzach Abbey (dissolved) at Zurzach (Aargau): men's collegiate foundation (Herrenstift)

== Sources ==
- Historisches Lexikon der Schweiz (in German, French, and Italian)
- Helvetia Sacra (in German and French)
