= Geney =

- Commune
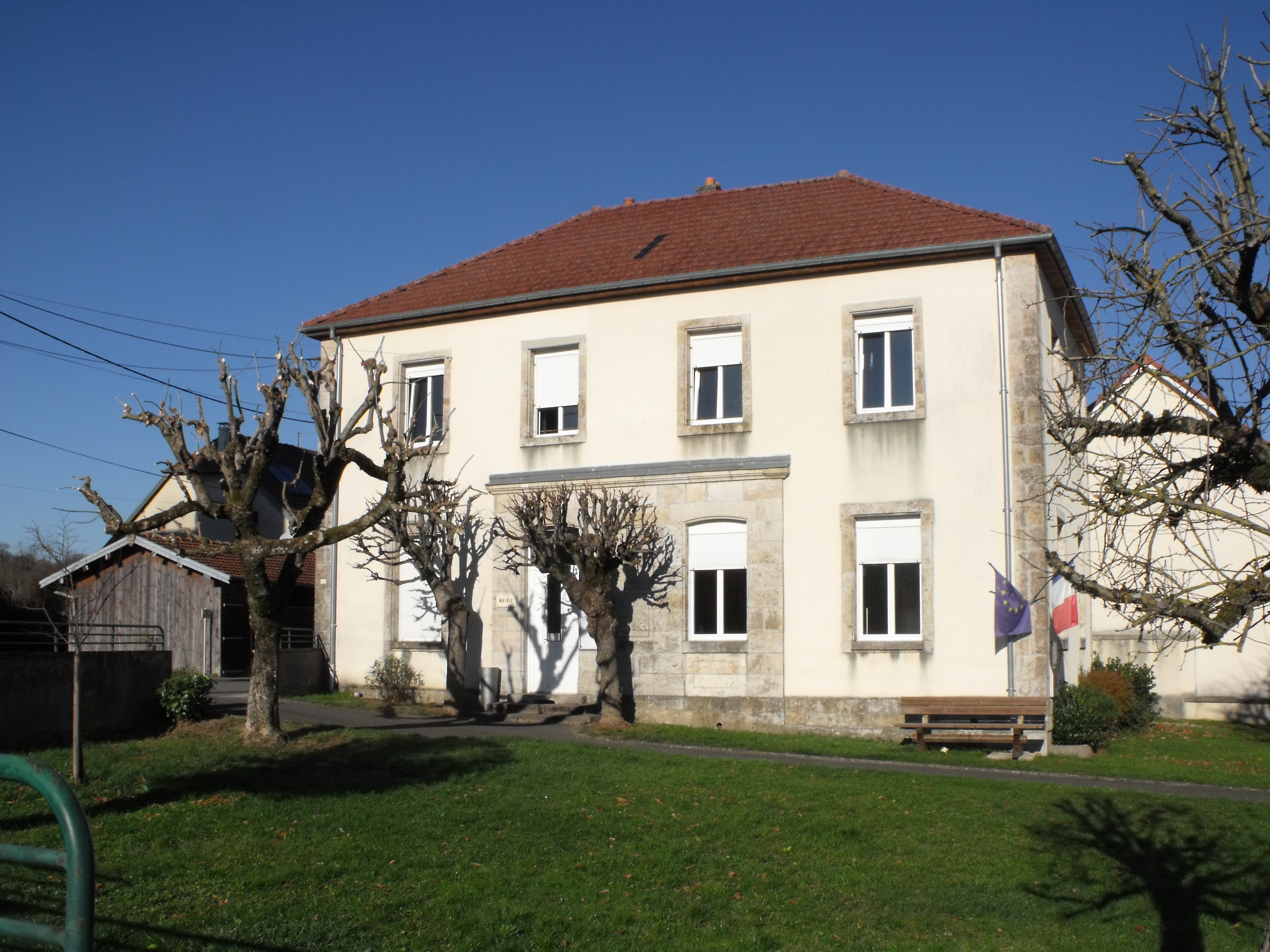
- The town hall in Geney
- Location of Geney
- Location within France Location within Bourgogne-Franche-Comté
- Coordinates: 47°29′12″N 6°34′03″E
- Country: France
- Region: Bourgogne-Franche-Comté
- Department: Doubs
- Arrondissement: Montbéliard
- Canton: Bavans

Government
  - Mayor (2020–2026): Georges Contejean
- Area^{1}: 4.33 km^{2} (1.67 sq mi)
- Elevation: 370 m (1,210 ft)
- Highest elevation: 464 m (1,522 ft)
- Lowest elevation: 300 m (980 ft)
- Population (2023): 125
  - Density: 28.9/km^{2} (74.8/sq mi)
- Time zone: UTC+01:00 (CET)
  - Summer (DST): UTC+02:00 (CEST)
- INSEE/Postal code: 25266 /25250
- ^{1} French Land Register data, which excludes lakes, ponds, glaciers > 1 km^{2} (0.386 sq mi or 247 acres) and river estuaries.

Geney (French pronunciation: [ʒənɛ]) is a commune in the Doubs department in the Bourgogne-Franche-Comté region in eastern France.

The Abbey of Lieu-Croissant was located here.

== Population ==
Historical population
Year	Pop.	±% p.a.
1968	153	—
1975	147	−0.57%
1982	144	−0.29%
1990	136	−0.71%
1999	130	−0.50%
2007	146	+1.46%
2012	151	+0.68%
2017	119	−4.65%
2023	125	+0.82%
Source: INSEE

Inhabitants of Geney are called Geneys in French.

== See also ==
- Abbey of Lieu-Croissant
- Communes of the Doubs department
