= Rathausen Abbey =

Former Cistercian convent in Ebikon

- Kloster Rathausen
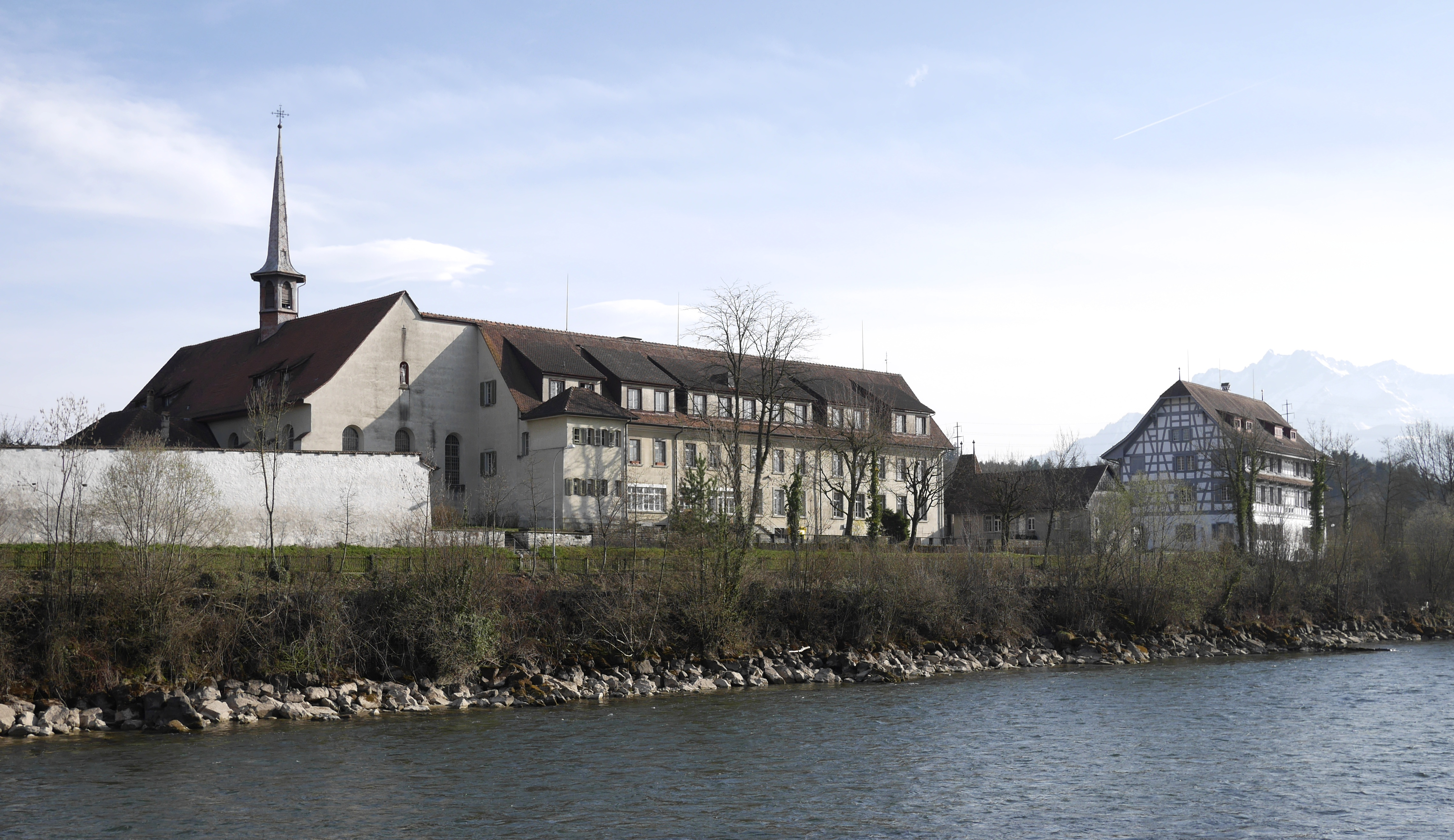
- Interactive map of Rathausen Abbey

Monastery information
- Full name: Abbey of Saint Mary and Saint George
- Other names: Domus consilii (1251); Rathusen (1259)
- Order: Cistercians
- Established: 1245
- Disestablished: 1848
- Mother house: Lucelle Abbey (until 1266); St. Urban's Abbey (1266–1649)
- Dedication: Virgin Mary and Saint George
- Diocese: Diocese of Constance; Diocese of Basel (from 1819)

Site
- Location: Ebikon, Lucerne
- Country: Switzerland

The Rathausen Abbey was a Cistercian convent for women located in the municipality of Ebikon in the Canton of Lucerne, Switzerland. Founded in 1245 and dedicated to the Virgin Mary and Saint George, it was part of the Diocese of Constance and later the Diocese of Basel from 1819. The convent's father-immediate was the Abbot of Lucelle until 1266, and subsequently the Abbot of Saint-Urbain until the exemption of 1649.

== History ==
=== Foundation and early years ===
A female religious community that had moved in 1245 from Horw to Riedholz near Ebikon received authorization from the bishop in 1251 to establish a convent. The community was admitted into the Cistercian Order in 1260 or 1261, following an inspection ordered by the General Chapter. In 1274, several sisters were sent to Ebersecken where they formed the first community of a newly founded convent. The superior of Rathausen held the title of abbess. The nuns came primarily from prominent bourgeois families of Lucerne and the surrounding area.

By the mid-14th century, Rathausen was forced to sell land and organize collections to finance the reconstruction of its church, which had fallen into ruin. In 1528, the city of Lucerne placed the house under its supervision.

=== Reorganization and exemption ===
In 1588, the nuncio Ottavio Paravicini reorganized the four female convents of Lucerne, all threatened in their existence, leaving only Rathausen and Eschenbach to survive. As Saint-Urbain was no longer able to exercise spiritual direction over Rathausen, the nuncios appointed Jesuits as confessors. This arrangement eventually provoked a conflict (Beichtigerhandel) during which Pope Innocent X detached Rathausen from the Cistercian Order to submit it directly to the Holy See (exemption of 1649). Around 1700, Saint-Urbain recovered certain rights but did not obtain reincorporation.

=== Suppression and aftermath ===
Following the suppression of Rathausen in 1848, the sisters emigrated to Eschenbach, then to Schwyz (1855), to Vézelise in Lorraine (1876), and finally to Thyrnau near Passau in Bavaria (1902). The convent buildings, which passed to the canton, housed a teachers' college (1849–1867) and then an orphanage (Rathausen children's home, 1883–1988). In 1990, they were assigned to a foundation that cares for people with severe disabilities.

== See also ==
- List of Christian monasteries in Switzerland

== Bibliography ==
Helvetia Sacra, III/3, pp. 862–892

Bernart, M. 750 Jahre Zisterzienserinnenabtei Rathausen-Thyrnau, 2 volumes, 1995

Hennig, Barbara; Meyer, André. Das Amt Luzern. Die Landgemeinden, 2009, pp. 103–121 (Die Kunstdenkmäler des Kantons Luzern, Neue Ausgabe 2)
