= Ippolita Orelli =

17th-century Benedictine nun and chronicler

- Born: Caterina Orelli; March 1631; Locarno, Old Swiss Confederacy
- Died: 4 June 1702; Claro, Old Swiss Confederacy
- Other names: Hippolita Lucia Orella, Ippolita Lucia Orelli
- Occupations: Benedictine nun, chronicler
- Relatives: Giuseppe Orelli (father); Marta Aurelia (mother)

Ippolita Orelli (born Caterina Orelli; March 1631 – 4 June 1702) was a Benedictine nun at the Claro Abbey and author of the monastery's chronicle. She is considered the first known female historian of the Italian-speaking bailiwicks of Switzerland.

== Family background ==
Caterina Orelli was the daughter of Giuseppe Orelli and Marta Aurelia. She belonged to the Catholic branch of the Orelli family, a noble family from Locarno that played an important political role north of Lake Maggiore and in the Ambrosian Valleys during the Middle Ages and early modern period. In the 16th century, the lineage divided for confessional reasons. While family members who had adhered to the Reformation were forced into exile in 1555 and gave rise to the Zürich branch, the Orelli who remained in Locarno had to prove the solidity of their Catholic faith.

== Education and monastic life ==
Caterina Orelli received a good education within her family, which she later consolidated at the convent. It is unknown whether she attended the school of the Claro Abbey, as did other representatives of her lineage. The monastery operated the only boarding school for girls in northern Ticino and Mesolcina at the time and possessed one of the most important female conventual libraries in Ticinese territory. She entered the monastery as a novice in 1650 and pronounced her solemn vows in 1652, taking the religious name Ippolita Lucia.

== Chronicle ==
Ippolita Orelli authored a chronicle, probably written between 1693 and 1697 at the request of the vicar general for nuns of the Diocese of Milan, Gerolamo Strada, and the abbess of Claro, Carla Caterina Frasia. The production of such works was linked to the desire to better regulate the life of monastic institutions in the wake of the Catholic Reformation. In 90 densely written folios, the manuscript traces the history of the Claro convent, which was founded in 1490 and held abbatial dignity.

In her chronicle, Ippolita Orelli assembled and alternated, in an ambitious editorial project, historical facts attested by sources that she had consulted and partially transcribed, with miraculous episodes. Her narrative begins with a portrait of the founding mother, Scolastica de Vincemalis (or Vicemalis), a nun from the Milanese monastery of Sant'Ulderico al Bocchetto. Following a miraculous healing that occurred in Claro through the intercession of the Virgin Mary, Scolastica had ordered the construction of a convent there. Using effective prose in harmony with the taste of the period, Ippolita Orelli recounts the lives and activities of the religious women who animated this holy place until the end of the 17th century. She describes not only their existence inside the monastery but also their connections with the outside world. Her chronicle discusses the application of the Tridentine decrees, the epidemics that struck the region, and the circumstances that led two nuns from Claro to re-establish the Benedictine convent of Seedorf (UR) in 1559.

== Historical significance ==
This chronicle, perhaps conceived as a source for the compilation of books of miracles or a pilgrimage guide, is a valuable document for the study of female spirituality and Marian devotion in the 17th century. The latter, having become an instrument of the reformist policy of the Catholic Church after the Council of Trent, experienced rapid diffusion among the popular classes at that time. Through her meticulous work on oral and written sources, Ippolita Orelli can be considered the first known female historian of the Italian bailiwicks.

== Bibliography ==
- Moretti, Antonietta: «Claro», in: Helvetia Sacra, III/1, 1986, pp. 1679-1712.
- Nicoli, Miriam; Cleis, Franca: La Gran Regina del Cielo e le Benedettine di Claro. Genealogia femminile di un Sacro Monte in area alpina nel manoscritto di suor Ippolita Orelli (1697), 2021.
