= Dominican Convent, Ilanz =

Building in Chur, Switzerland

- Kloster Ilanz
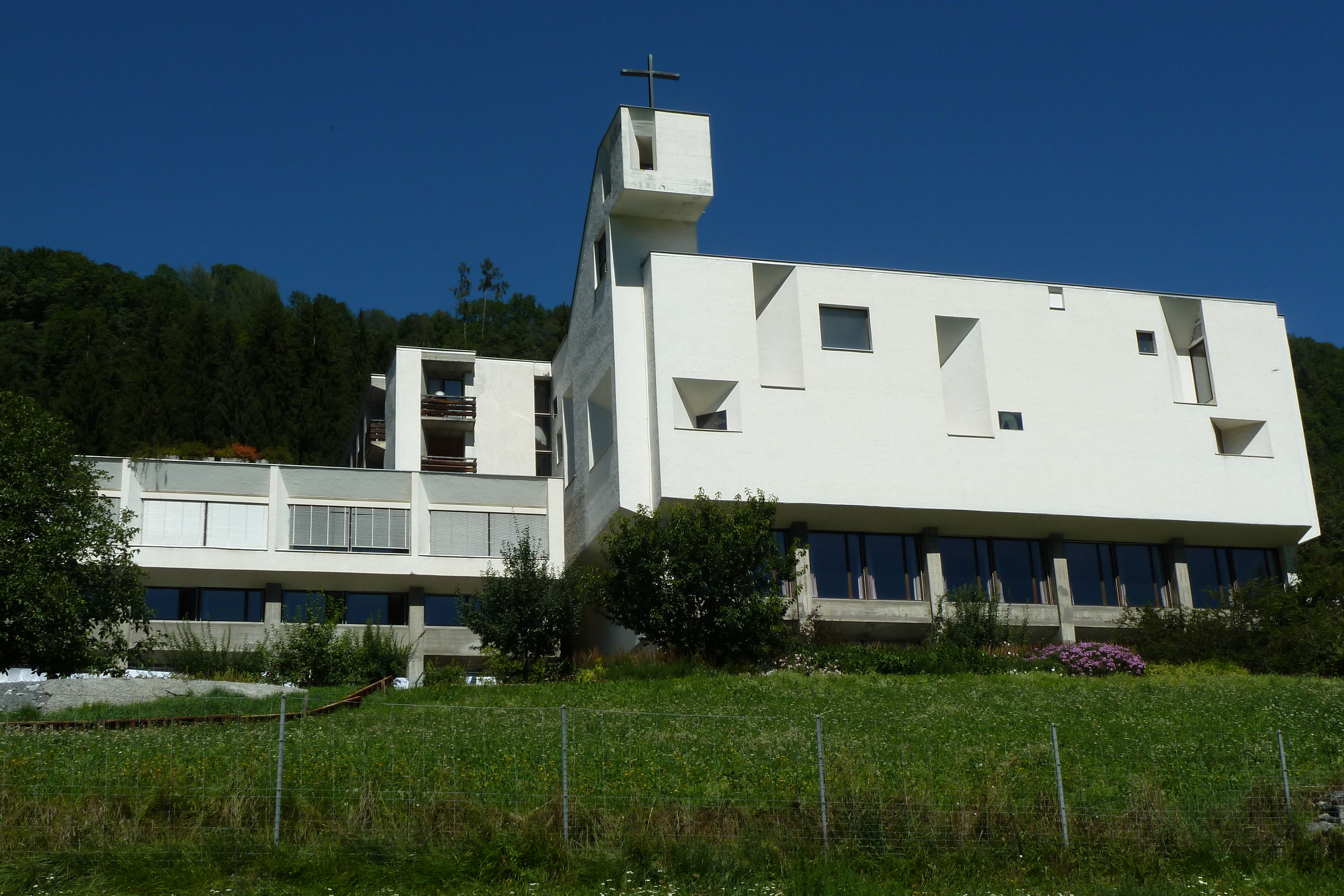
- The convent church at Ilanz

- Location within Switzerland

General information
- Location: Ilanz, GR, Switzerland
- Coordinates: 46°46′38.7″N 9°11′57.7″E

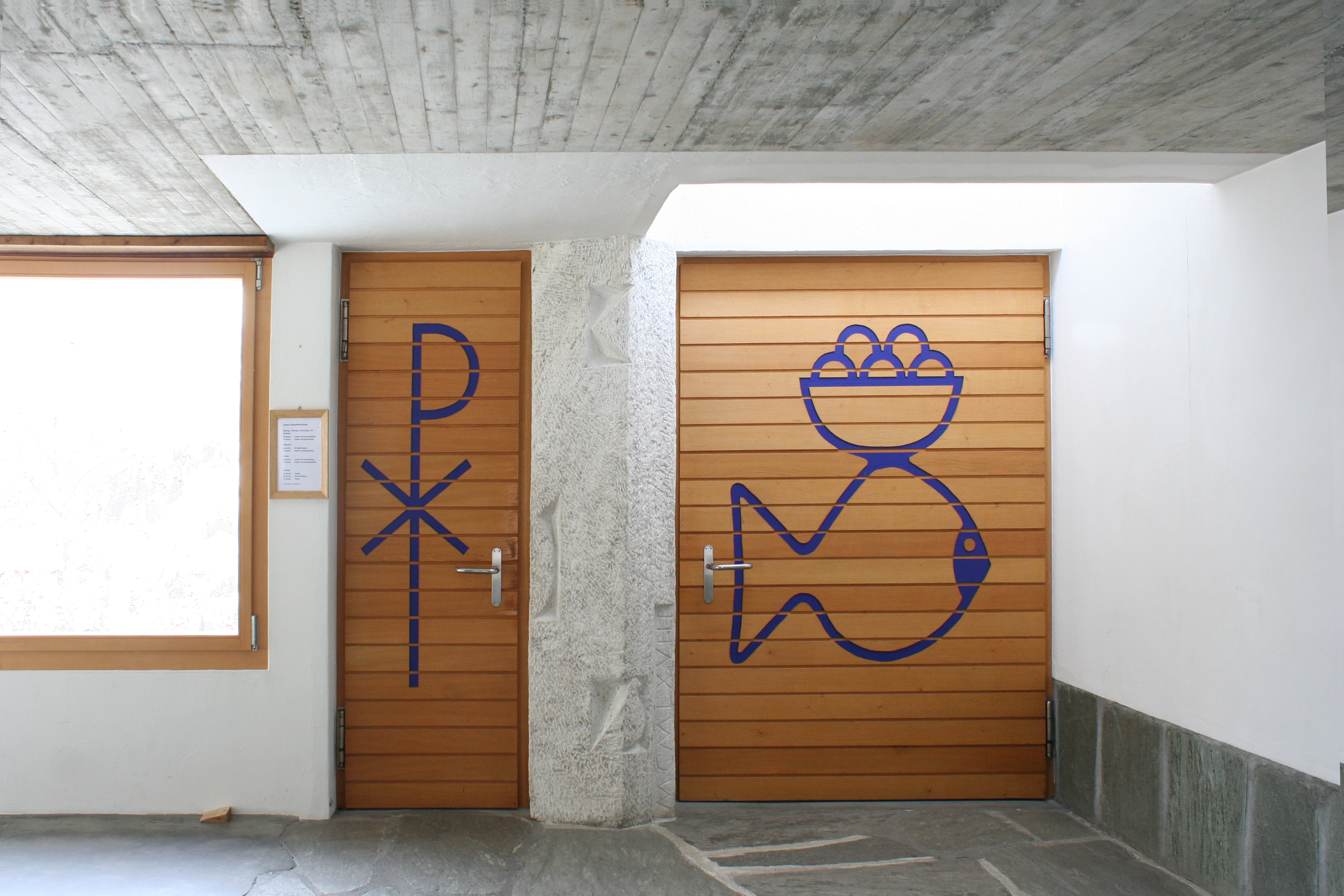
The door to the convent church

The Dominican Convent, Ilanz, the motherhouse of the Congregation of the Ilanz Dominican Sisters (German: Ilanzer Dominikanerinnen), is located on a low hillside across the valley from the little town, roughly 30 km (20 miles) to the west of Chur in the canton of Graubünden, Switzerland.

The striking convent buildings date from the early 1970s, but the community traces its origins back to St. Joseph's Institute, founded with an educational remit at Ilanz in 1865. Today the sisters at Ilanz are the core element of an international community comprising around 160 sisters, members of one of a number of congregations of Ilanz Dominican Sisters operating from addresses in Switzerland, Germany and Austria. Outside Europe there is also one congregation in Brazil and another in Taiwan.

== History ==
=== Early years ===
The community recognises two founders, Johann Fidel Depuoz (1817-1875), born in Graubünden, and Babette Gasteyer (1835-1892), born far to the north, in Wiesbaden.

Johann Fidel Depuoz became a Jesuit in 1840, received an appropriate training in theology, and was ordained. For twenty years he travelled abroad, visiting Savoy, Maryland (USA), Liège, Münster, southern Germany, Solferino, Padua and Ragusa (as Dubrovnik was then called). Church-state conflict was a feature of the pontificate of Pope Pius IX, and in 1874, the Jesuits were officially banned across Switzerland, as part of a wider Kulturkampf which traditional English language history sometimes perceives as a purely German clash. (The Swiss ban on Jesuits was not lifted until 1973 when the matter was resolved with a referendum.) Depuoz resigned from the Jesuits and returned to Surselva, his home district, keen to support education and attend to social deprivation in what was at that time a remote and under-developed part of Switzerland. Also around this time he obtained a doctorate in theology from Rome. During the third quarter of the nineteenth century he ministered energetically in Chur, Schluein and finally in Ilanz as a pastor and educator. In 1865, Dr Depuoz opened the educational St Joseph's Institute in Ilanz, reflecting his particular concern for the education of the young. The other principal priority at the outset was provision of professional-level hospital services for the sick of the Surselva district.

Babette Gasteyer received her training in Wiesbaden and then started out as an educationalist, working at aristocratic houses in what are now Germany, Austria and Moravia, also at times working as a nurse. In 1866 she was recruited as a teacher by Depuoz. In the convent she had the religious name Maria Theresia Gasteyer. It was she who led and sustained the congregation as its first mother superior, through the difficult early years.

Adherence of the Ilanz community to the Dominican Order was subsequently discussed, and formally implemented in 1894 when a Dominican took over leadership of the community, following mediation involving the Catholic-Conservative National Assembly member, Caspar Decurtins.

=== Twentieth century ===
Activities expanded during the first half of the twentieth century. As well as the Institute School and the hospital, from 1940 the sisters were running the Graubünden Academy for nursing as well as a school for (female) farmers. They were also working in the Ilanz kindergarten and primary school and conducting catechesis in the parish. In the cantonal capital to the east the sisters were running both a secondary school and a commercial school (Handelsschule). In many of the little towns and villages of rural Graubünden they were working in the kindergartens, and providing residential care homes for the frail and elderly in Sedrun, Trun and Davos (where the facility also served as a convalescent home).

The Ilanz Dominican Sisters were also present in several of the big cities in Switzerland's central belt, running the Sanitasspital (hospital) in Zürich (later relocated to nearby Kilchberg) and district kindergartens in several quarters of the city and additional operational centres further to the west in Basel and Fribourg. To the east, in Austria, they were active in Schruns with an agricultural college and a hospital and in Salzburg in providing care for the elderly. In Germany the Ilanz Dominican Sisters had daughter communities in Düsseldorf, Walberberg, Erkelenz and Schwichteler. Closer to home, across the Bodensee in Lindau they ran another old people's home. In Vechta in Lower Saxony there was a missionary centre with its own printing shop and a Dominican boarding school. Outside Europe, in 1922 missionary centres were set up in Fujian in mainland China, and in Taiwan across the water. There is another centre in Itapetininga, Brazil.

Societal changes in the second half of the twentieth century changed the focus of the Ilanz Dominican Sisters. Important community institutions came under public control, including in 1973 the hospital in Ilanz and the nursing academy (which subsequently, in 2011, was simply abolished by the cantonal authorities).

== Convent complex ==
Located up a gentle hillside on the left bank of the Rhine, the present convent complex was built to a design produced in 1969 by Walter Moser, the Zürich-based architect responsible for the design of 17 monasteries built across Switzerland in the modern style since 1960.

The four principal elements of the complex are the convent itself, the convent church, the meeting hall ("Haus der Begegnung") and a school that now accommodates the Surselva Handelsschule. The Haus der Begegnung itself includes a single- and double-sized class room, its own kitchen, a meditation room and an auditorium able to accommodate up to 200 people.

=== Convent church ===
The convent church is positioned at the heart of the complex. It has seating for 300. The architect Walter Moser has produced a contemplative white-walled interior, reminiscent in some of its elements of the work of Le Corbusier. Daylight enters through window apertures of varying sizes. The altar area, set one step above the rest of the church, is surrounded on three sides by benches. The altar, ambon and tabernacle, along with the seat for the officiating priest, are formed from Swiss Cristallina marble by the Zürich sculptor Alfred Huber (1908–1982). The front of the otherwise unadorned marble altar is faced with an inset relief of a wine cup.

An arcade runs along an inner wall of the church, supported by twelve pillars, each of which incorporates a candle, recalling the twelve apostles as "pillars of the church". The ceiling has been painted by Max Rüedi from Zürich with "undulating moving ribbons" ("wellig bewegten Farbbändern").

==== Windows ====
The twelve stained glass windows made by Max Rüedi together comprise an important feature in the overall design of the convent church.

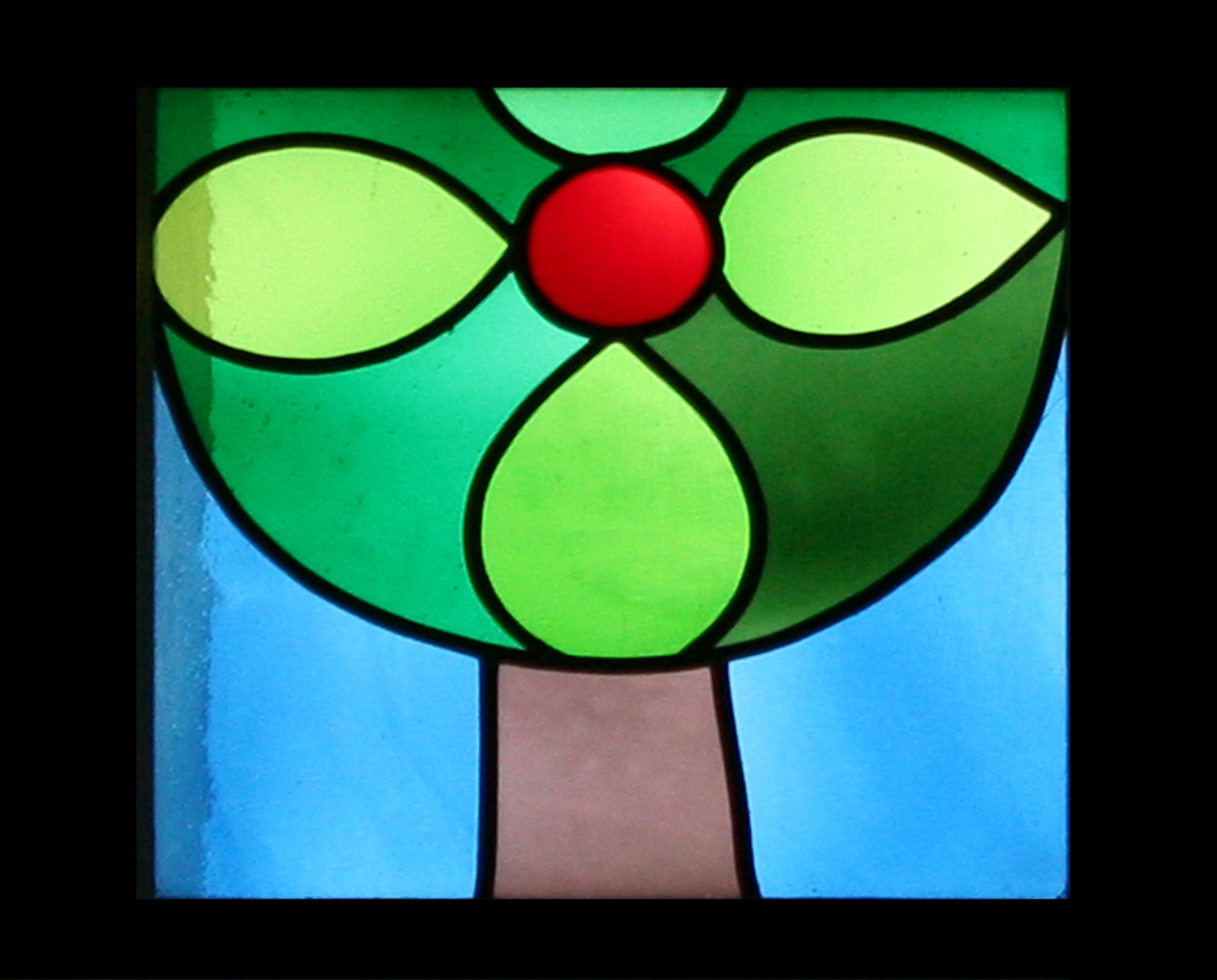
Paradiesesbaum (Tree of Paradise)

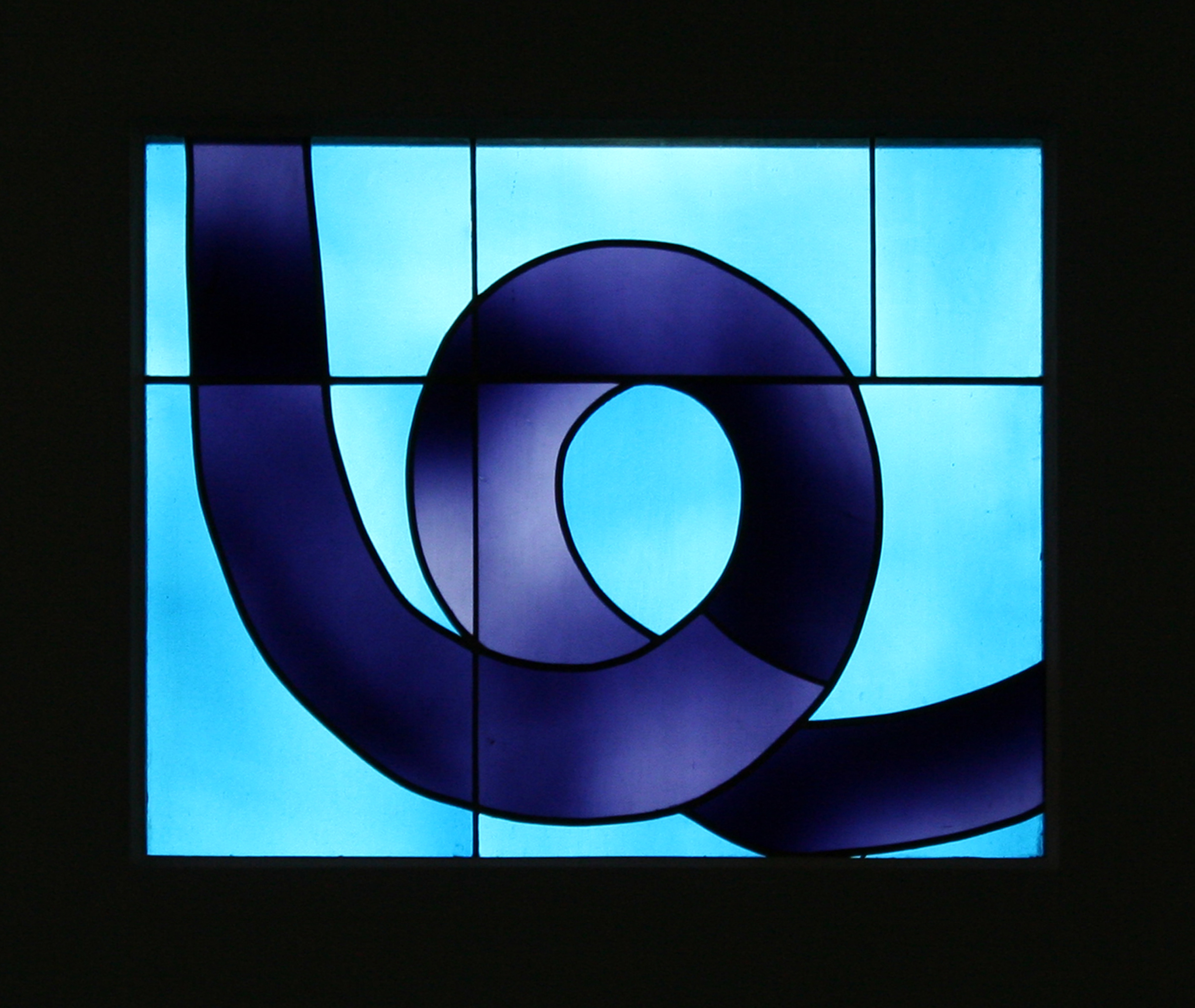
Schlange (Serpent)

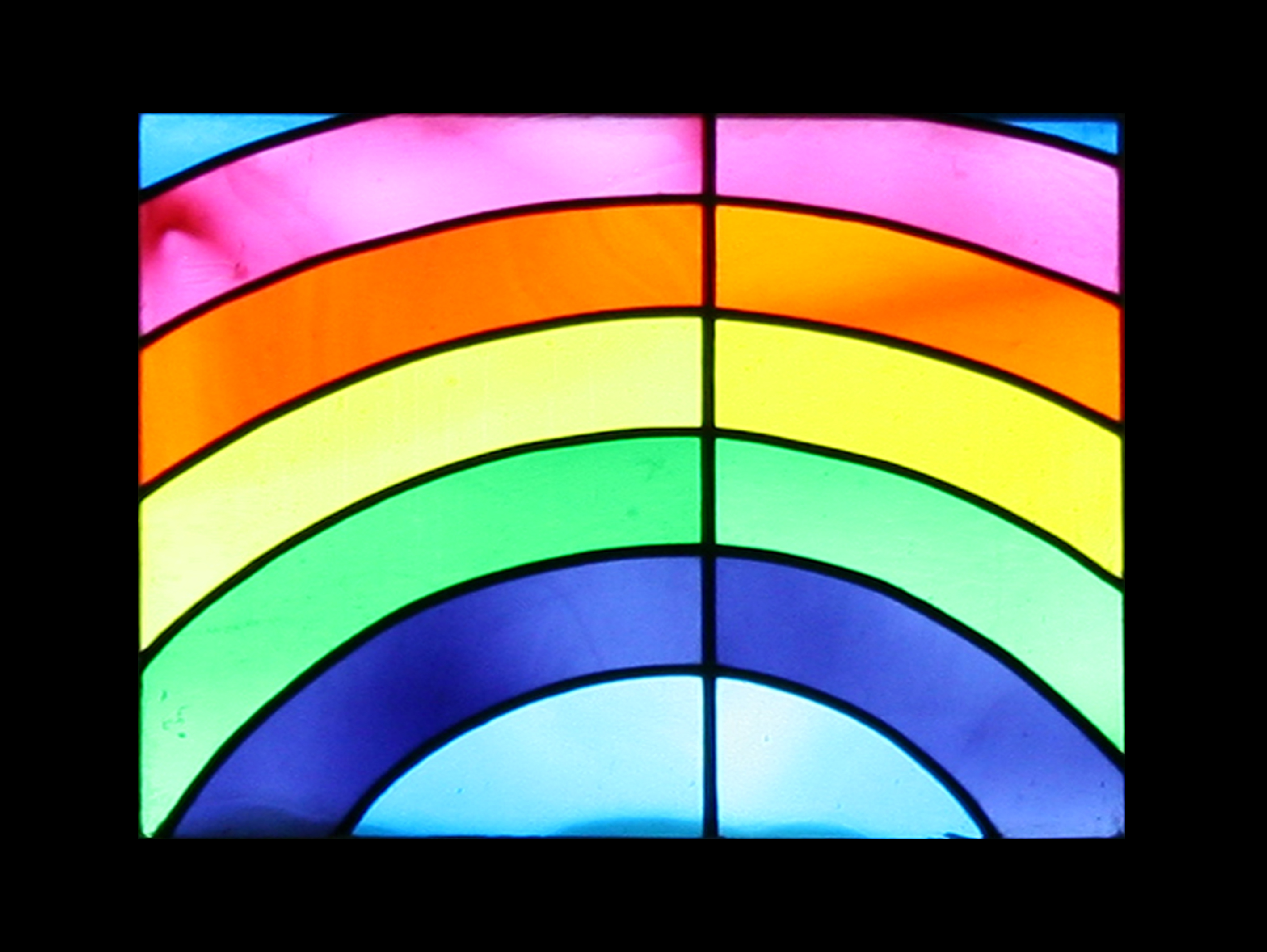
Regenbogen (Rainbow)

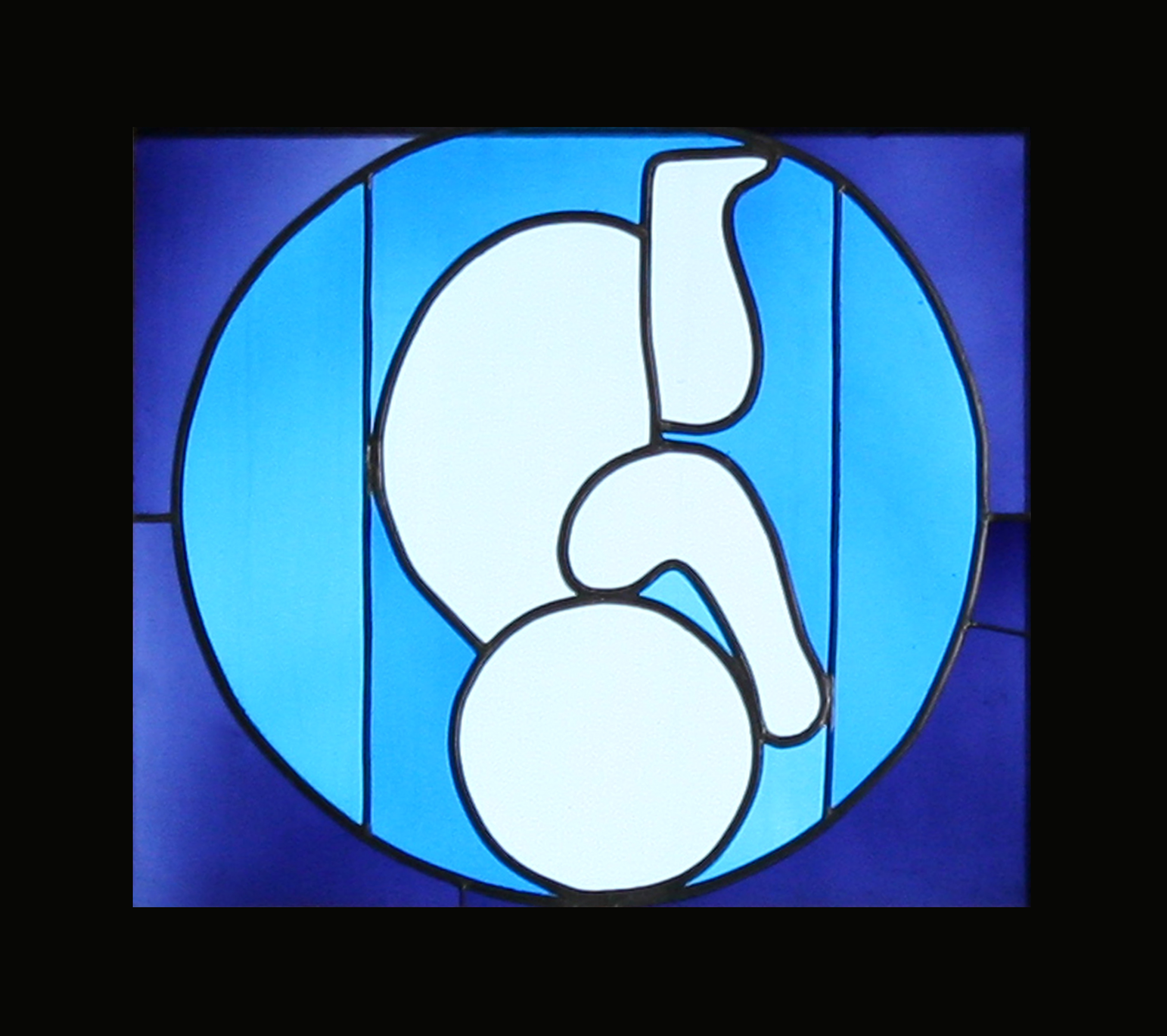
Menschwerdung (Incarnation)

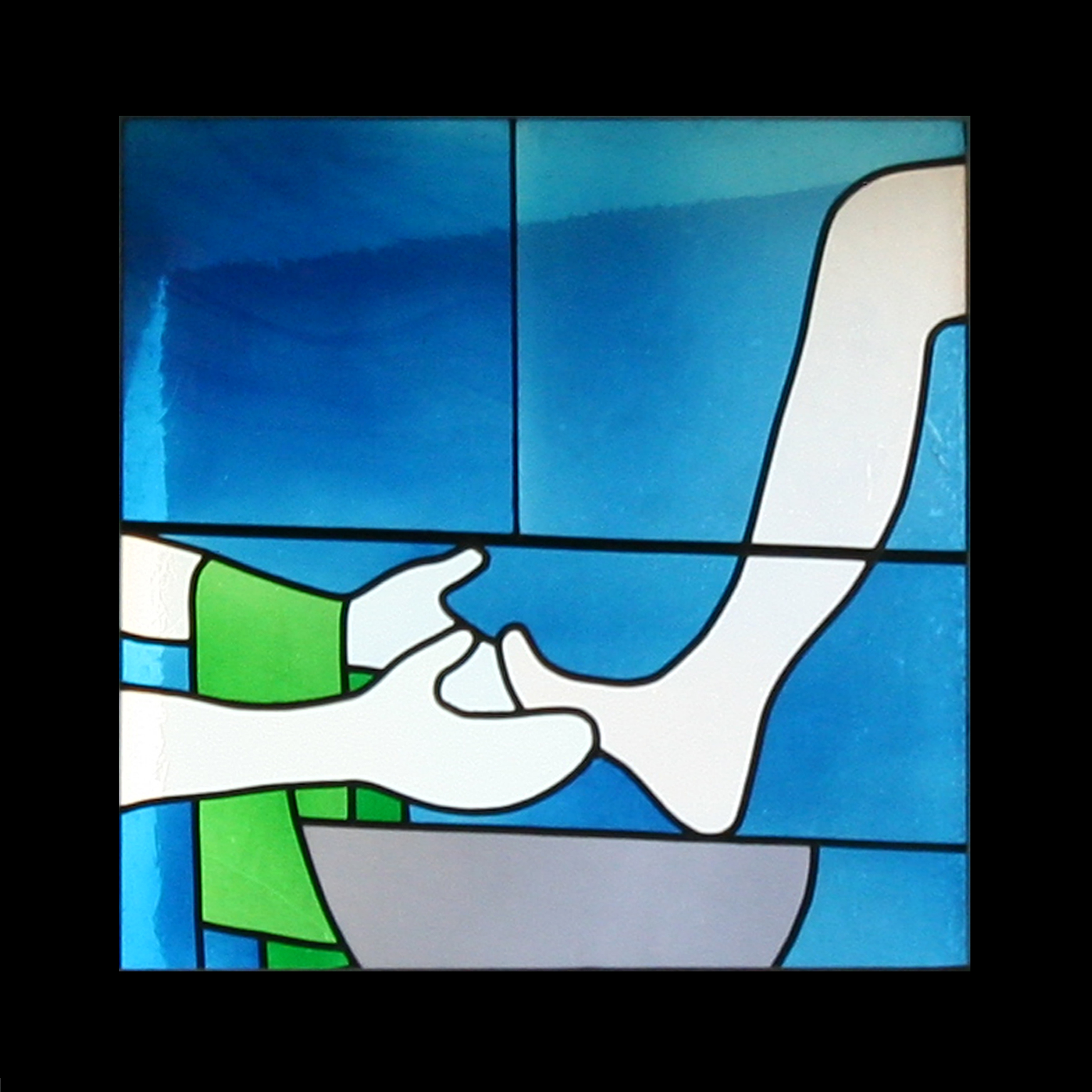
Fusswaschung (Footwashing)

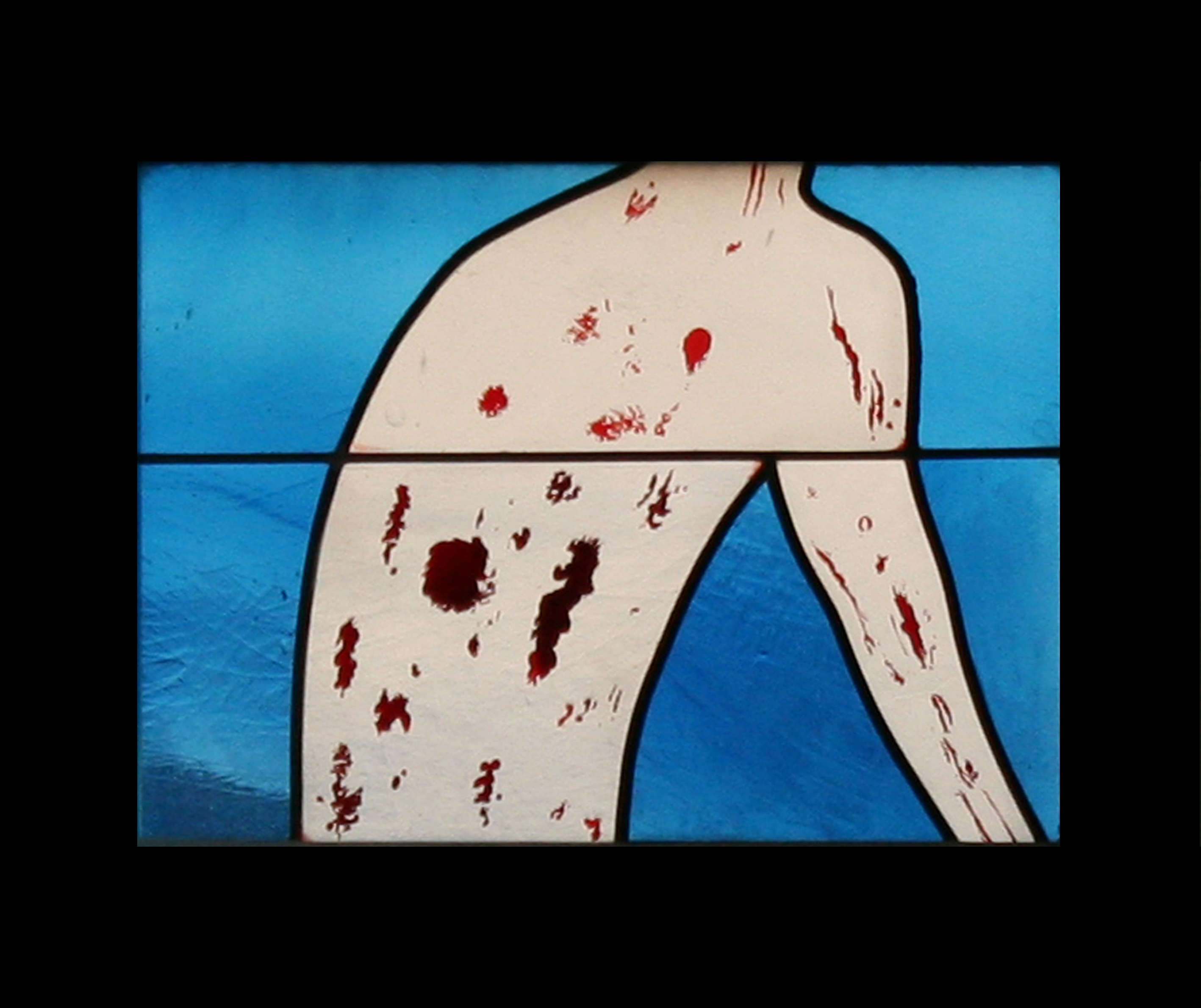
Geisselung (Whipping)

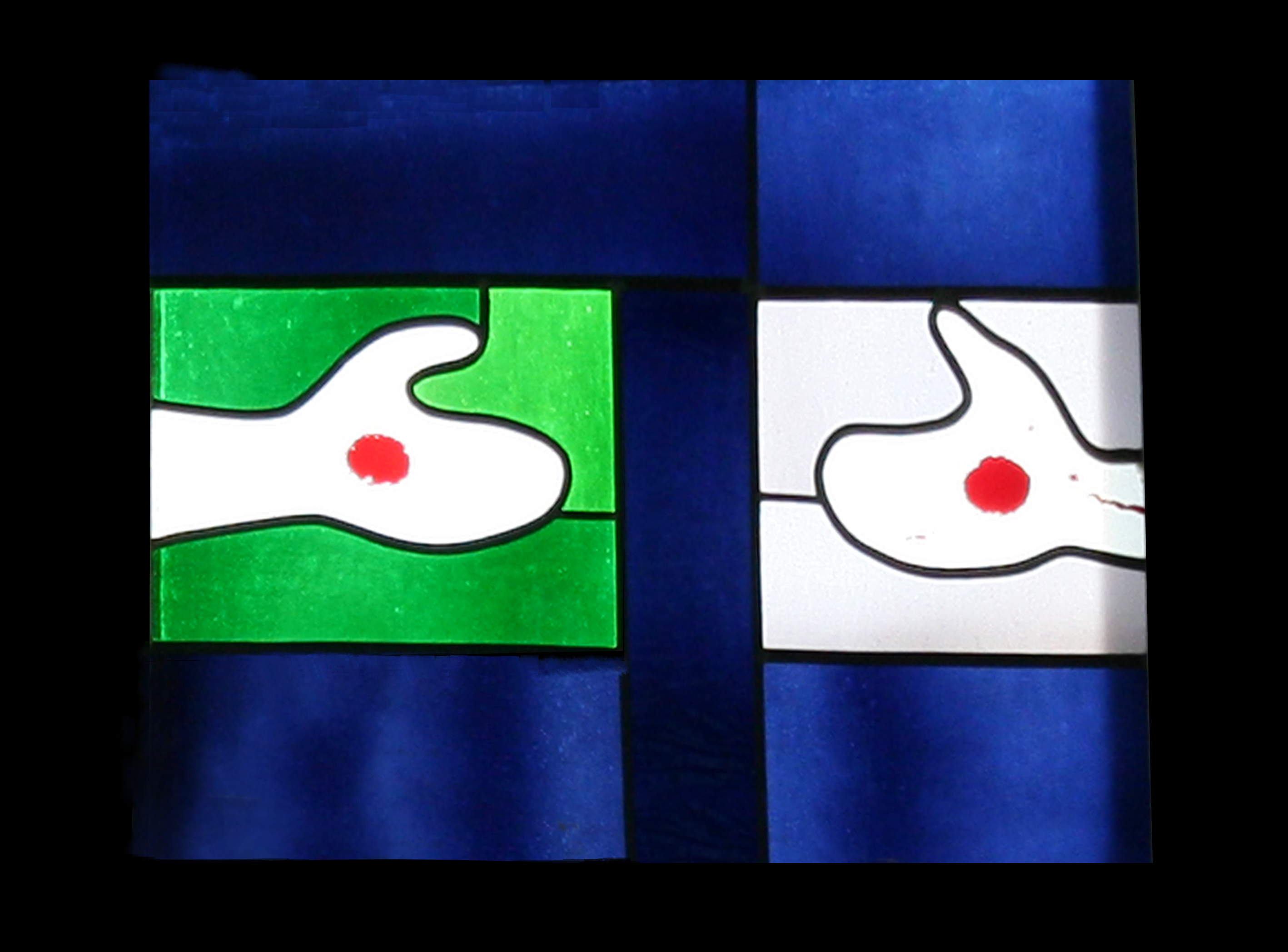
Kreuzigung (Crucifixion)

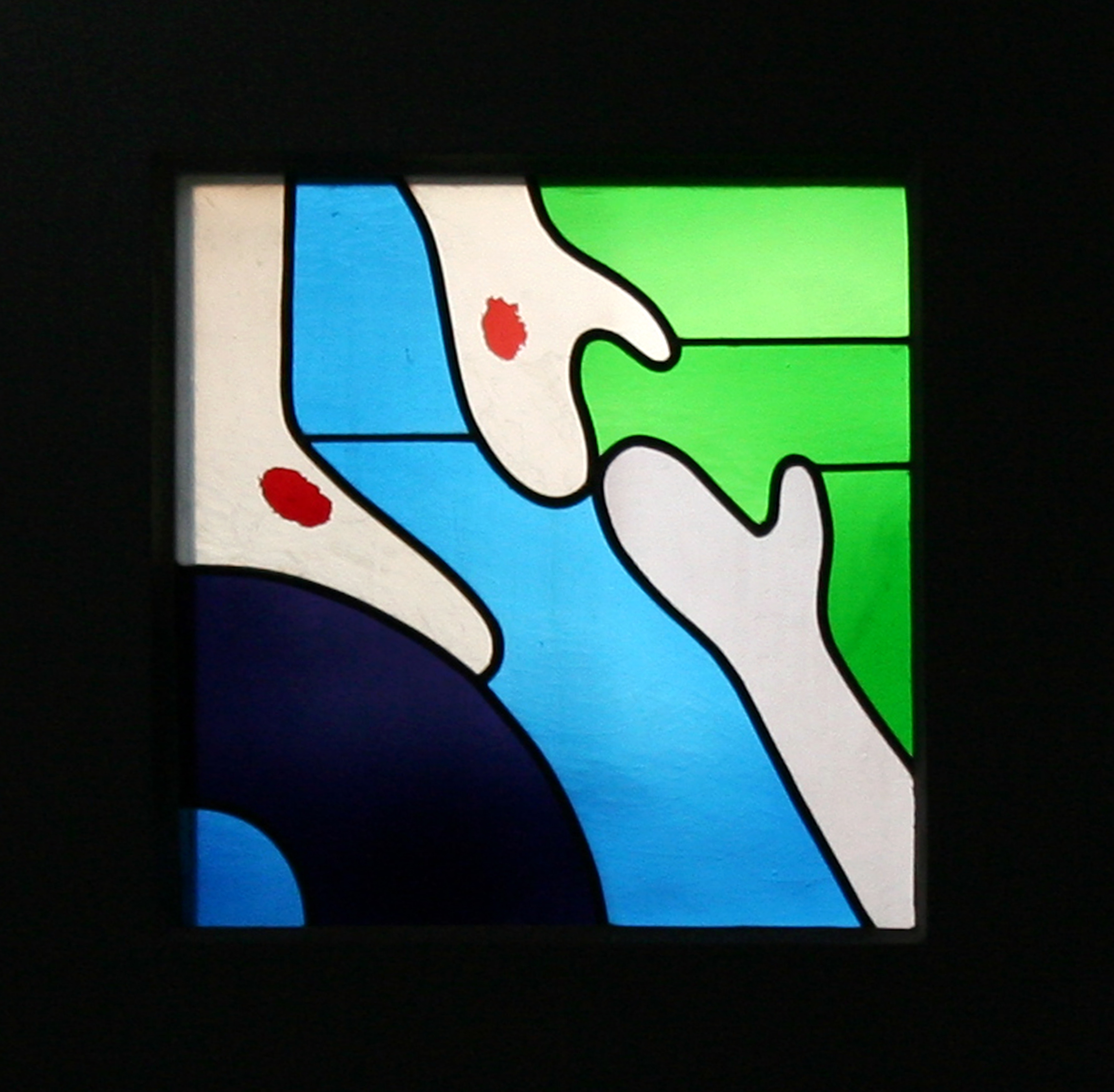
Abstieg (Descent into Hell)

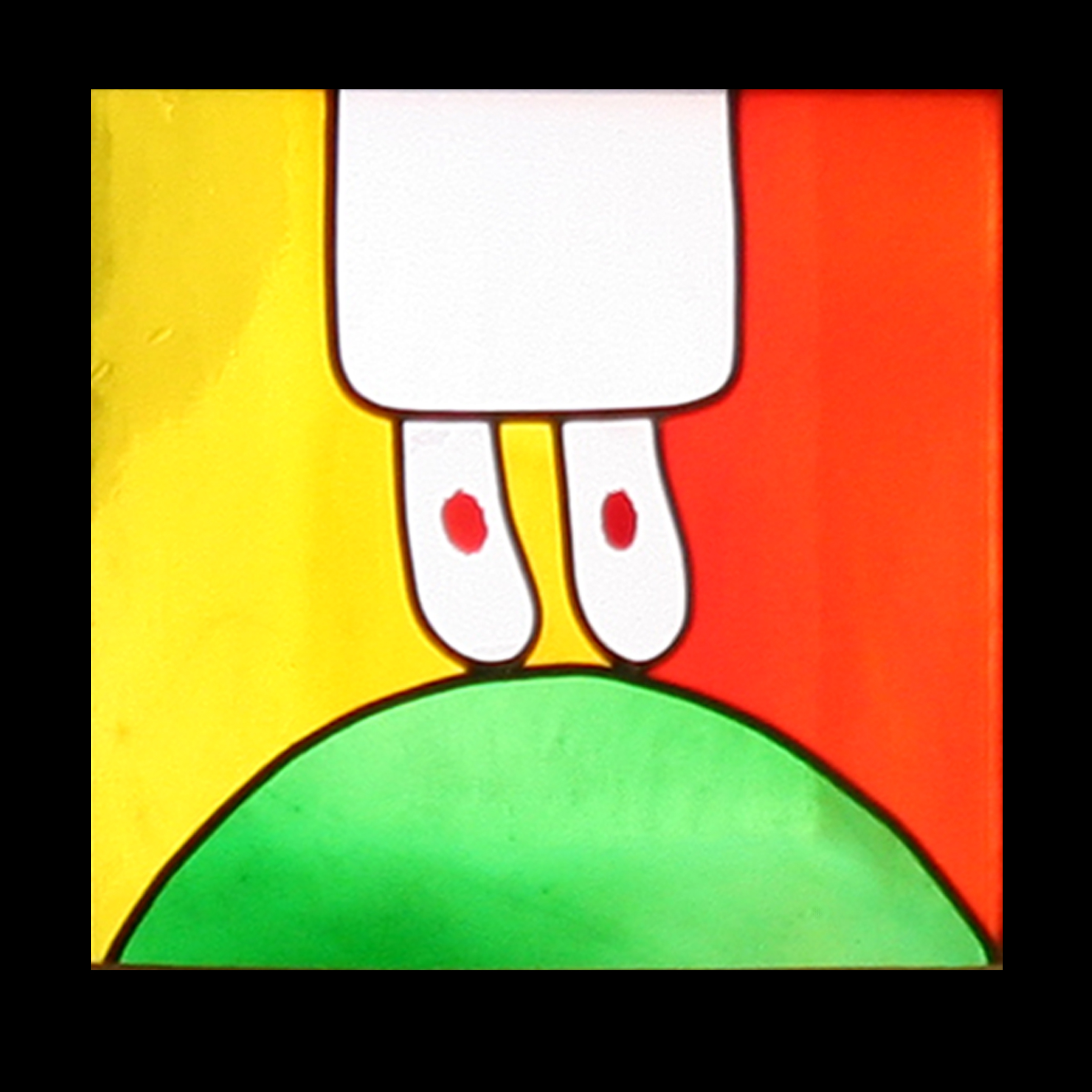
Himmelfahrt (Ascension into Heaven)

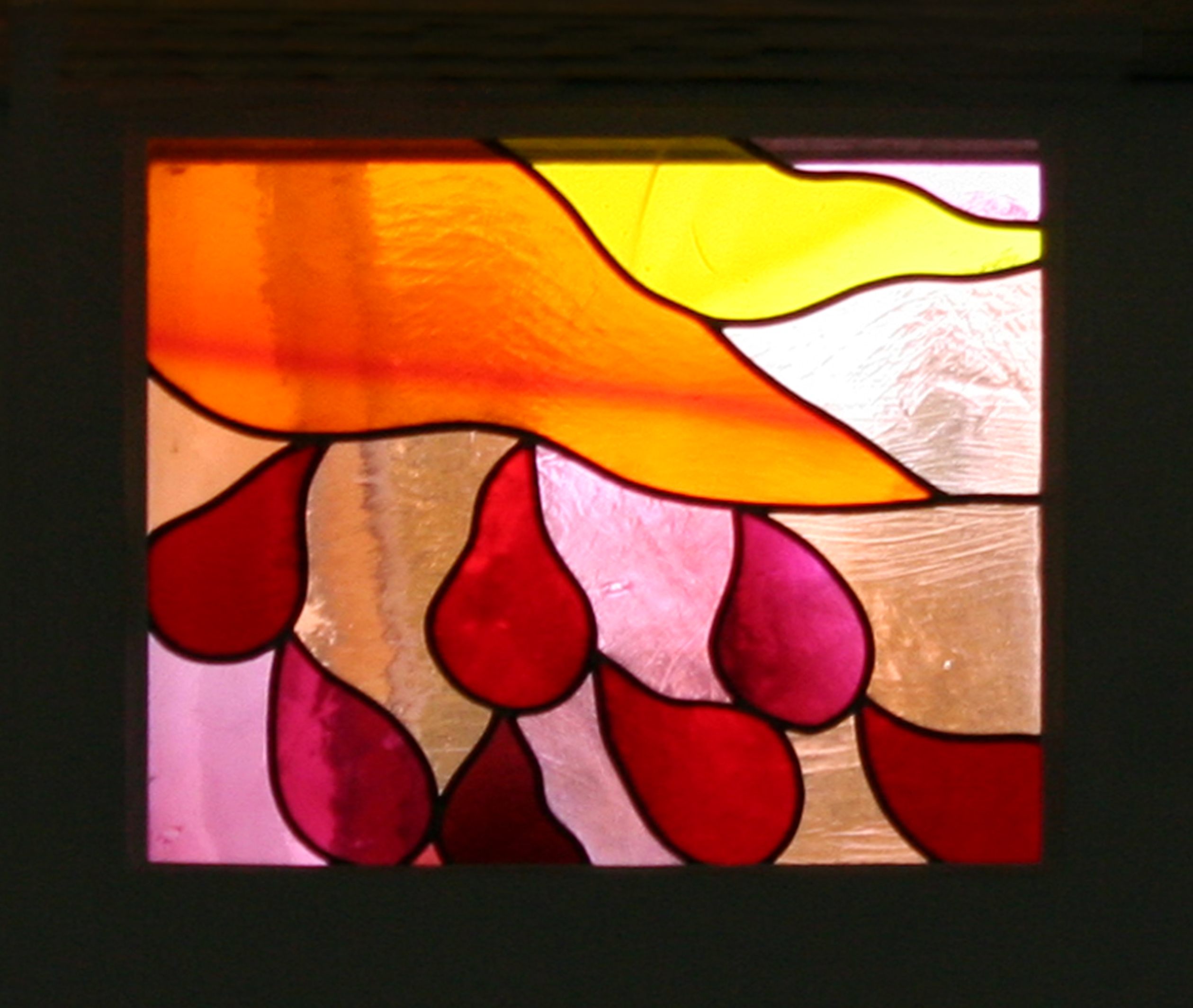
Pfingsten (Pentecost)

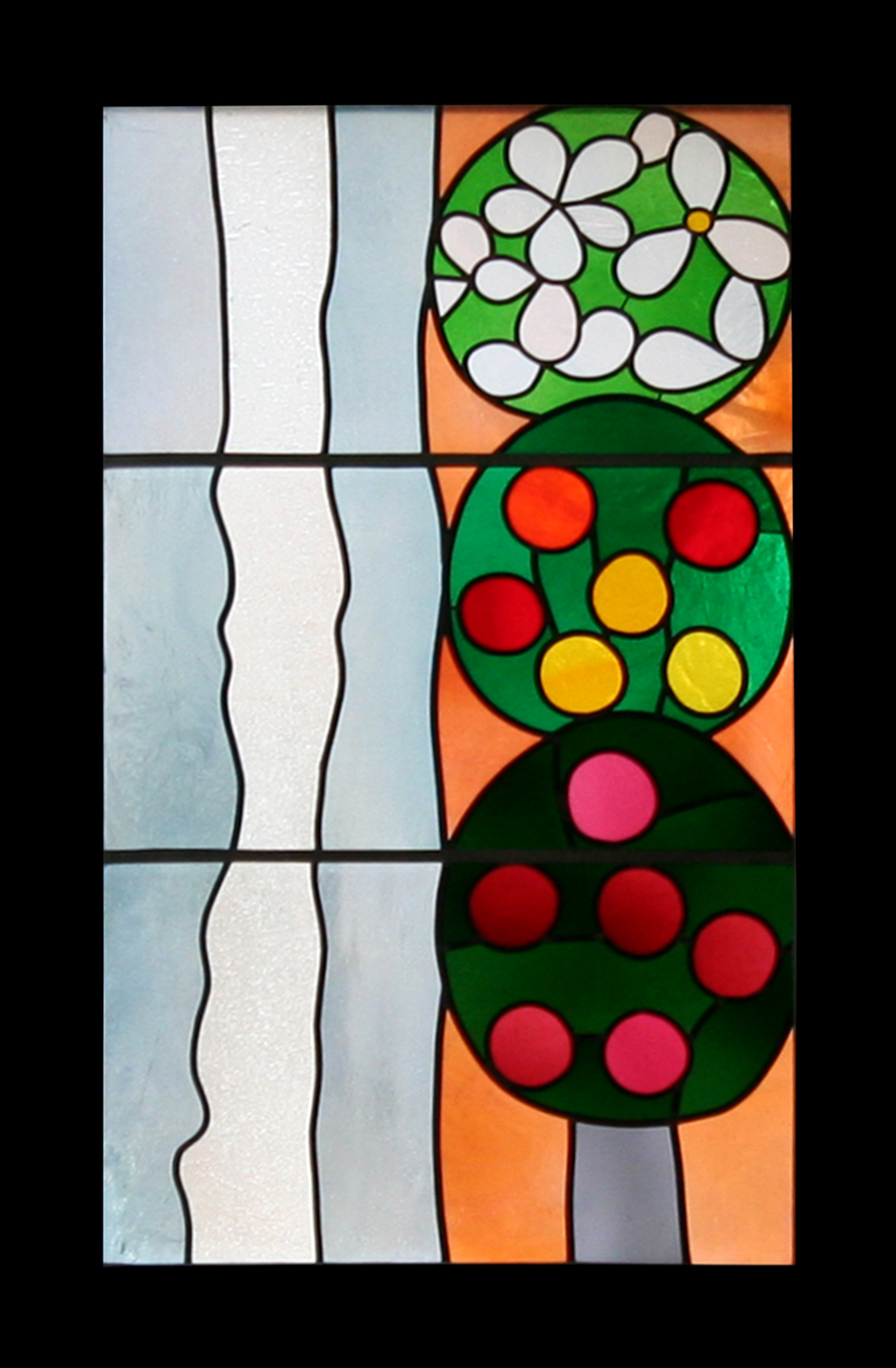
Lebensstrom (Current of life)

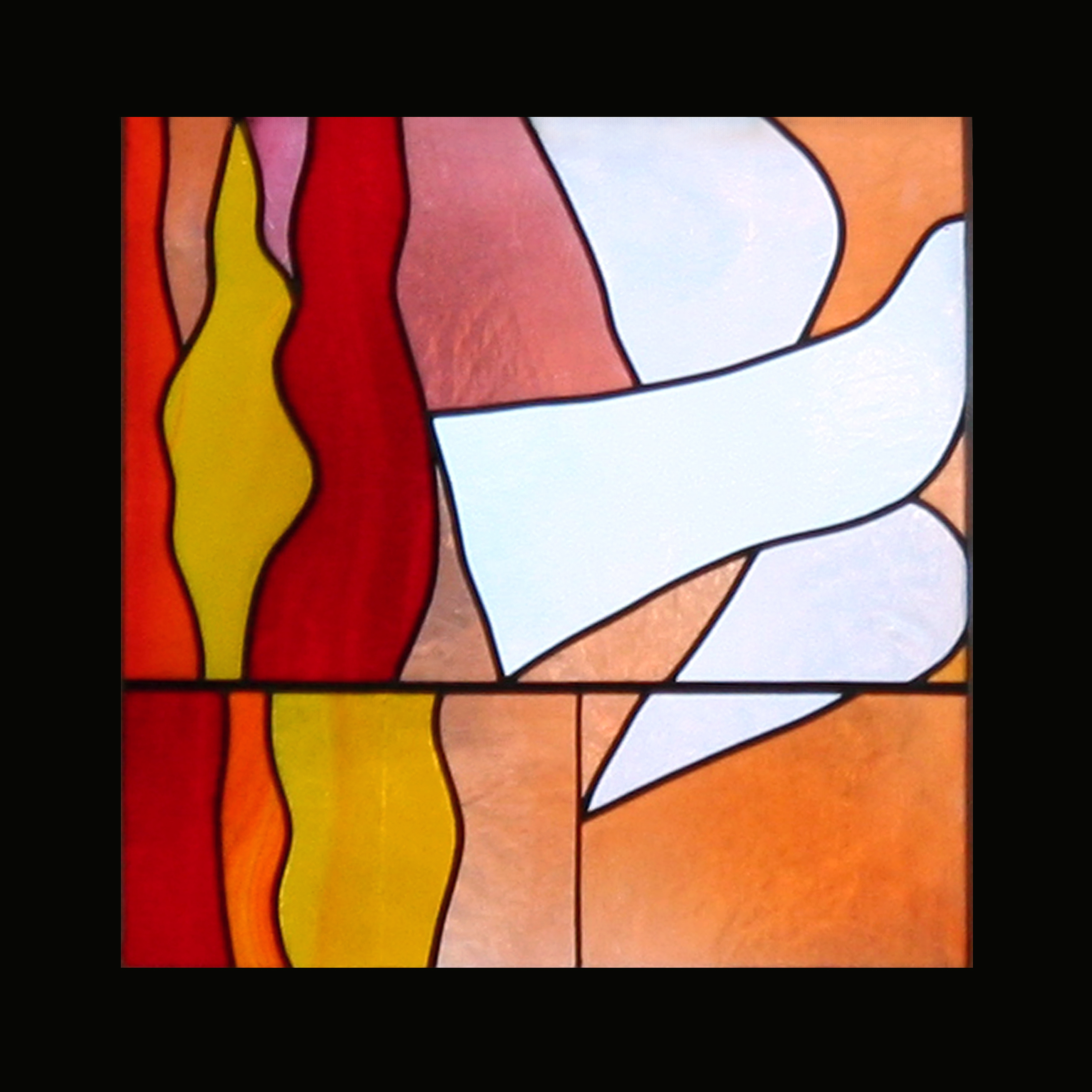
Vollendung (Completion/Perfection)

==== Organ ====
The organ is positioned on the south wall of the monastery church in three niches of differing heights. The instrument was built in 1972 by Mathis Orgelbau of Näfels in the adjacent canton. The commissioning and disposition particulars for the organ were drawn up by K. Kolly of Neuendorf.
