= Trub Abbey =

Former monastery in Bern, Switzerland

- Kloster Trub
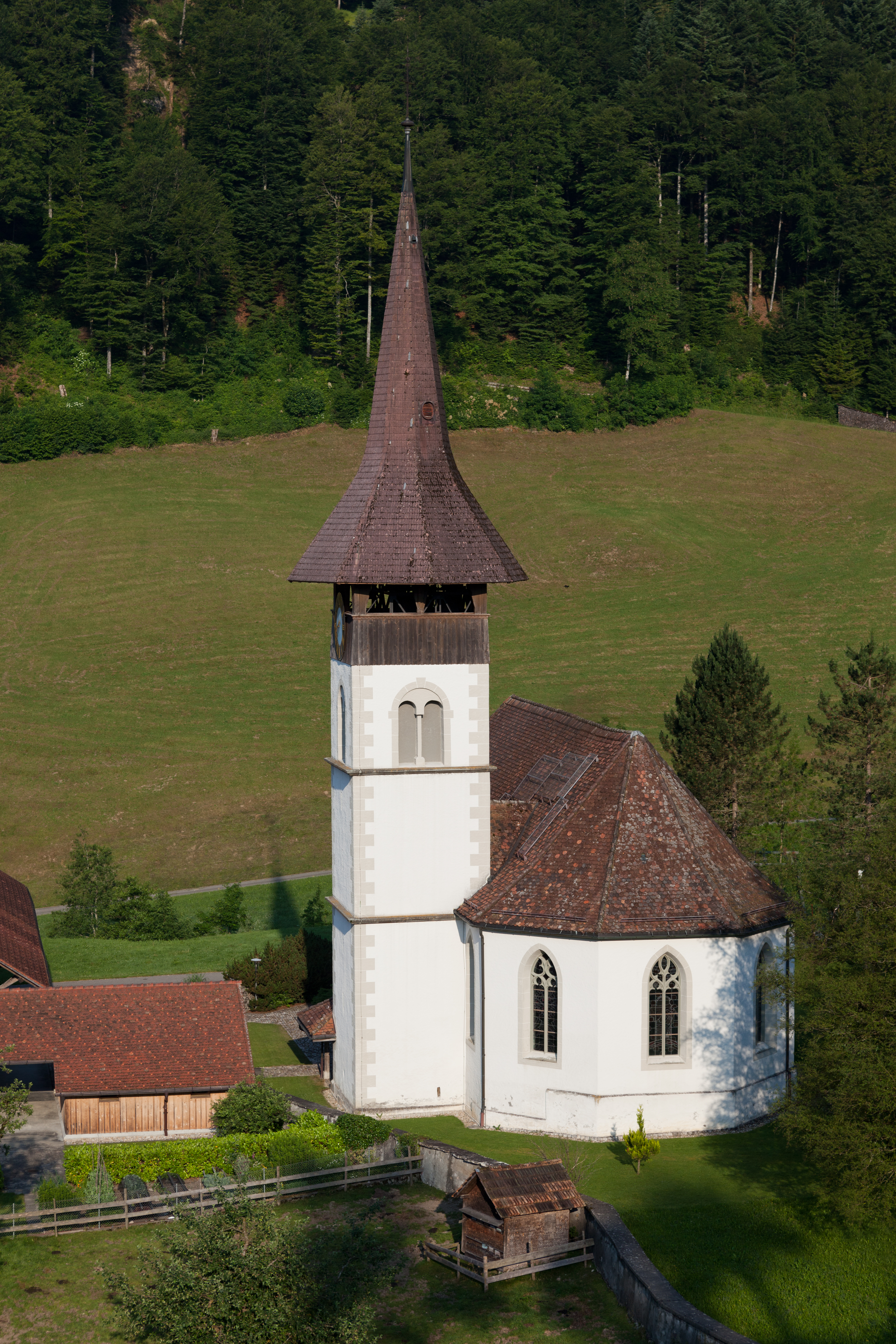
- The former abbey church

- Location within Switzerland

Monastery information
- Full name: Holy Cross
- Order: Benedictine
- Established: around 1128-30
- Disestablished: 1528

People
- Founder: Thüring von Lützelflüh

Site
- Location: Trub, Canton of Bern, Switzerland
- Coordinates: 46.943150°N 7.877221°E
- Visible remains: abbey church is still active as a Swiss Reformed Church
- Public access: the church is active

Trub Abbey is a former Benedictine monastery in the municipality of Trub in Bern Switzerland

== History ==
The coat of arms of the Abbey and eventually of the municipality

In 1125 Thüring von Lützelflüh donated land around modern Trub to St. Blaise Abbey in the Black Forest to establish a monk's cell. A few years later, between 1128 and 1130, he was able to separate Trub from St. Blaise and raise it to an independent Abbey. At that time it was dedicated to the Holy Cross. The Abbey's lands and rights, at that time it was recorded as monasterium de Trouba, were confirmed by Pope Innocent II and King Conrad III in 1139. Around 1224 it was known as the convent von Truob.

The secular and military rights over the monastery lands remained with the Lützelflüh family and their descendants, the Freiherren von Brandis until 1455. The rights were then sold to Kaspar von Scharnachtal who held them until his death in 1473, after which they transferred to the city of Bern. During the 13th century, the Abbey forged political ties with Bern and in 1286 its residents became citizens of the city.

The confirmation document of 1139 listed 40 properties that the Abbey owned, including 28 in the Emmental region and 7 in Oberaargau. The remaining five were more distant properties, two vineyards between Cressier and La Neuveville and farm houses in Därligen on Lake Thun, in Entlebuch, Canton of Lucerne and Otelfingen in Zürich. The Abbey buildings grew rapidly over the following years and a Romanesque church was built. Over the following centuries, the Abbey continued to receive or purchase property throughout western Switzerland. Several houses and places in these communities still bear the name Trub from when they were owned by the Abbey.

The village of Trub grew up around the Abbey and was under the low court of the Abbey. However, the high court was under the secular Kyburgs. The Abbey provided chaplains and lay priests to many communities within the Emmental, which they recruited from the local farmers. A total of 24 abbots are known to have presided over the Abbey. In the early years of the Abbey, these abbots came from the minor nobility or the Ministerialis (unfree knights in the service of a feudal overlord) class. After 1400, this changed and the abbots were now former farmers or livestock herders.

In 1414 the mostly wooden Abbey was almost totally destroyed in a fire. It was rebuilt in stone, but in 1501 large parts were destroyed again in a fire. In 1528 Bern accepted the new faith of the Protestant Reformation and secularized all the monasteries in their territory. Most of the Abbey library and its treasures did not survive the two fires and the Reformation. The last abbot of Trub, Heinrich Ruoff, and the remaining nine members residents received a stipend from the Canton to leave the Abbey. The church was converted into a Swiss Reformed parish church. The east and west wings of the Abbey gradually fell into disrepair and were demolished. The south wing was bought by a local farmer and converted into a farm house. The coat of arms of the Abbey became the coat of arms for the municipality of Trub.

== See also ==
- List of Christian monasteries in Switzerland
