= Rathausen children's home =

Former Catholic children's home in Lucerne, Switzerland

Rathausen Children's Home
- Kantonale Erziehungsanstalt Rathausen
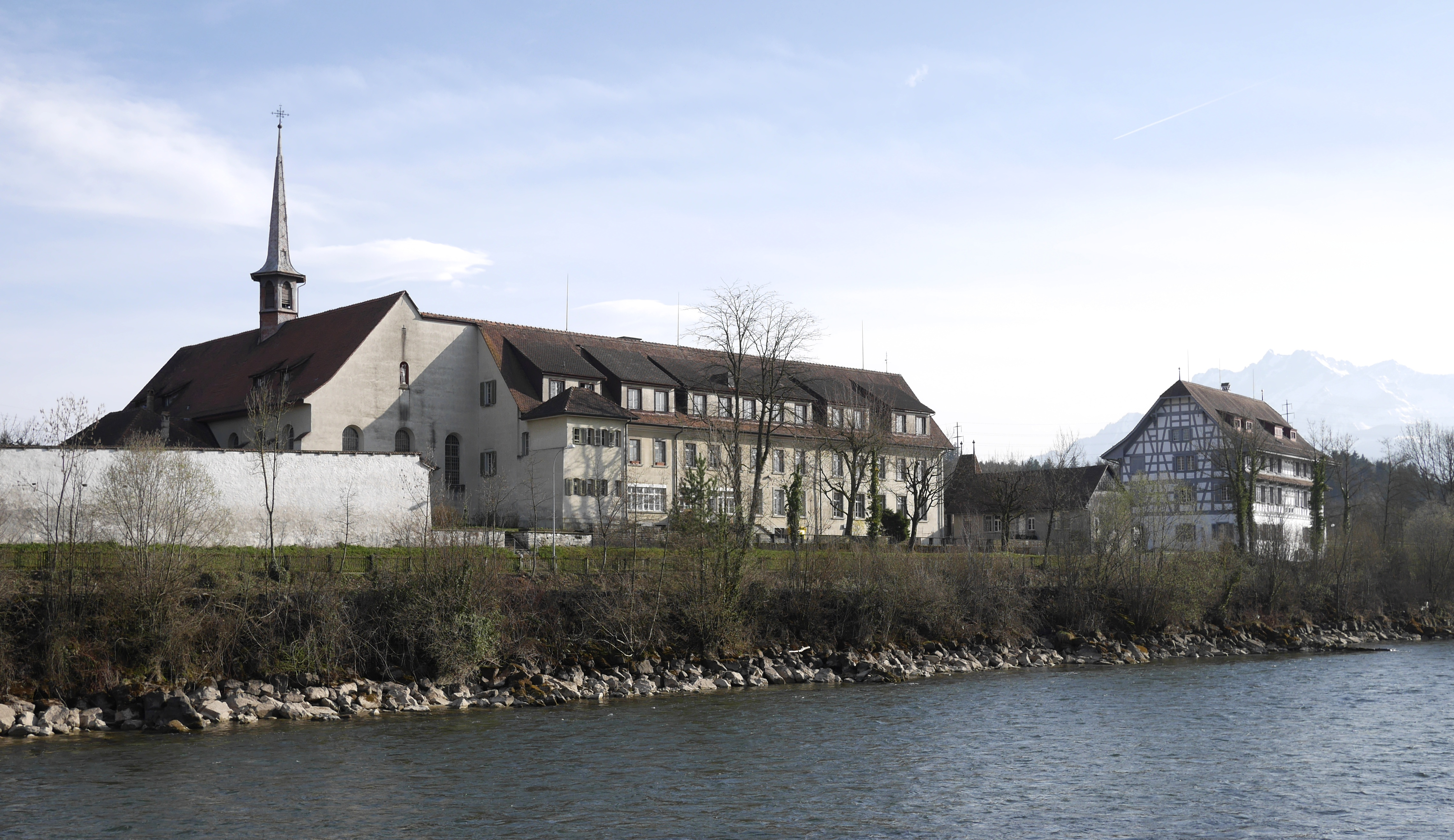
- Former names: Verpflegungs- und Erziehungsanstalt armer Kinder (1883–1934); Kantonale Erziehungsanstalt Rathausen (1934–1943); Kantonales Erziehungsheim Rathausen (1943–1951); Kinderdörfli Rathausen (1951–1988)

General information
- Type: Children's home
- Location: Rathausen, Canton of Lucerne, Switzerland
- Opened: 1883
- Closed: 1988
- Owner: Canton of Lucerne (1883–1988)

The Rathausen children's home (Kinderdörfli Rathausen) was a Catholic children's home that operated from 1883 to 1988 in the buildings of the former Cistercian convent of Rathausen in the Canton of Lucerne, Switzerland. Established as a public institution to house poor children, it became one of the largest children's homes in the canton, housing over 200 residents at its peak. The institution was later revealed to have been the site of systematic abuse and mistreatment of children in its care, leading to public apologies from the Canton of Lucerne and the Roman Catholic Church in 2012.

== History ==
=== Foundation ===
The Catholic children's home was created at the initiative of Julius Schnyder von Wartensee, a member of the Lucerne cantonal government. In 1882, the Grand Council of Lucerne decided to establish a "boarding and educational institution for poor children" (Verpflegungs- und Erziehungsanstalt armer Kinder). The institution was renamed the "Cantonal Educational Institution of Rathausen" (Kantonale Erziehungsanstalt Rathausen) in 1934, and the "Cantonal Educational Home of Rathausen" (Kantonales Erziehungsheim Rathausen) in 1943. After a complete reorganization in 1951 and until its closure in 1988, the establishment was known as the "Children's Village of Rathausen" (Kinderdörfli Rathausen).

The foundation of the children's home was part of public policy to combat poverty in Switzerland. Linked to the economic crisis of the era, which also affected agriculture in the Canton of Lucerne, it represented a response to growing criticism of the practice of child labor placement. Additionally, the possibility of accommodating poor children in the institution at modest cost relieved the financial burden on municipalities. The planned capacity of 200 residents was reached by 1885, and subsequently demand for places always exceeded supply. The majority of the children came from the Canton of Lucerne or were originally from a Lucerne municipality.

=== Organization and administration ===
The canton provided the buildings and 50 poses of agricultural land and granted annual funding from the ordinary budget or from revenues of the Cantonal Savings and Credit Bank. This was supplemented by contributions from municipalities and donations. The establishment was conceived as a private institution under public law. In this way, the authorities sought to contain pressure on public finances and limit potential financial claims from municipalities and individuals. The Lucerne Cantonal Council exercised financial oversight and appointed members of an expanded commission that established the institution's regulations and ensured compliance. This commission designated from within itself a supervisory commission of three to five members that served as the governing body.

The home's direction was entrusted to a Catholic clergyman whose appointment was subject to approval by the Bishop of Basel. Sisters of Ingenbohl were responsible for managing the house and caring for the children. The establishment employed a prefect and several lay staff as teaching personnel, domestic helpers, craftsmen, and farm workers.

=== Facilities and daily life ===
The former convent was only partially suitable for housing children and required significant repairs. After a major fire, the buildings had to be reconstructed in 1903–1904. The house had a large vegetable garden and an agricultural operation (Milchhof) that were intended to ensure its self-sufficiency. Work education played a central role in daily life: boys were assigned to agricultural work, while girls devoted themselves to household tasks (cooking, sewing, laundry) or gardening. School education (primary and secondary) was provided internally and placed under the responsibility of the Sisters of Ingenbohl. Starting in 1885, a lay teacher took care of secondary school boys. A proper secondary school was opened at Rathausen in 1935. However, the belief that children placed in institutions were not very gifted was widespread. Religion, considered an essential pedagogical instrument, and its practices were at the heart of the residents' daily life.

=== Abuse and reorganization ===
While criticism of the education provided at the institute was expressed on several occasions, it was rarely reported externally. In 1949, at the request of the official guardian of Winterthur, the Lucerne Cantonal Council commissioned an external commission to investigate living conditions at Rathausen. The investigation revealed severe repressive practices (humiliations, corporal punishment, solitary confinement), mass management based on a strict daily schedule, and at the staff level, a lack of resources as well as insufficient training and professional development. Accusations of sexual assaults on children were also made. In response, the director was dismissed and the establishment was reorganized and placed under the responsibility of a newly created private foundation (1951).

As part of the reorganization, management implemented a "family" system in which the sisters, as "group mothers," each cared for approximately 25 boys and girls. Instead of large dormitories, residential pavilions were constructed outside the former convent, whose enclosure was demolished. The number of residents was reduced to 150 (104 in 1974, 46 in 1982). Due to lack of replacements, the Sisters of Ingenbohl left Rathausen in 1972. The clergy also abandoned direction of the institute in 1976, which thus passed entirely under the responsibility of lay people. From 1979 to its closure in 1988, the establishment was transformed into a special school for children and adolescents with behavioral disorders recognized by the Federal Social Insurance Office. In 1990, the Stiftung für Schwerbehinderte Luzern, which had already been using the institution's vacant premises since 1983 to house people with severe disabilities, became owner of the Rathausen complex.

== Historical reassessment ==
Years after its closure, the home returned to public attention following testimonies from former residents who denounced the violence and abuse they had suffered. The Canton of Lucerne and the Roman Catholic Church in Lucerne commissioned two scientific studies that were presented to the public in 2012 and revealed serious dysfunctions. Until the 1970s, these problems affected the entire cantonal system of institutional placement and particularly struck Rathausen, one of the largest homes. Consequently, the Church and the canton presented their apologies to the affected persons, who often suffered their entire lives from trauma and the stigmatization linked to their past as institutionalized children. Due to the late reckoning with this history, no officials were held accountable.

== Bibliography ==
- Bieri, Beat: Das Kinderzuchthaus. Misshandelt nach göttlichem Recht, 2010 (documentary film, updated version 2012).
- Akermann, Martina; Furrer, Markus; Jenzer, Sabine: Bericht Kinderheime im Kanton Luzern im Zeitraum von 1930-1970. Schlussbericht zuhanden des Regierungsrats des Kantons Luzern, 2012.
- Ries, Markus; Beck, Valentin (ed.): Hinter Mauern. Fürsorge und Gewalt in kirchlich geführten Erziehungsanstalten im Kanton Luzern, 2013.
- Jenzer, Sabine: "Vom Lehrerseminar zum Kinderheim – Stationen der jüngeren Geschichte von Rathausen", in: Ebikon, Kloster Rathausen, 2016, pp. 41-51.
- Bossard-Borner, Heidi: Vom Kulturkampf zur Belle Epoque. Der Kanton Luzern 1875 bis 1914, 2017, pp. 239-247.
