= Lieu-Croissant Abbey =

Monastery in Doubs, France

Coordinates: 47°29′08″N 6°33′47″E

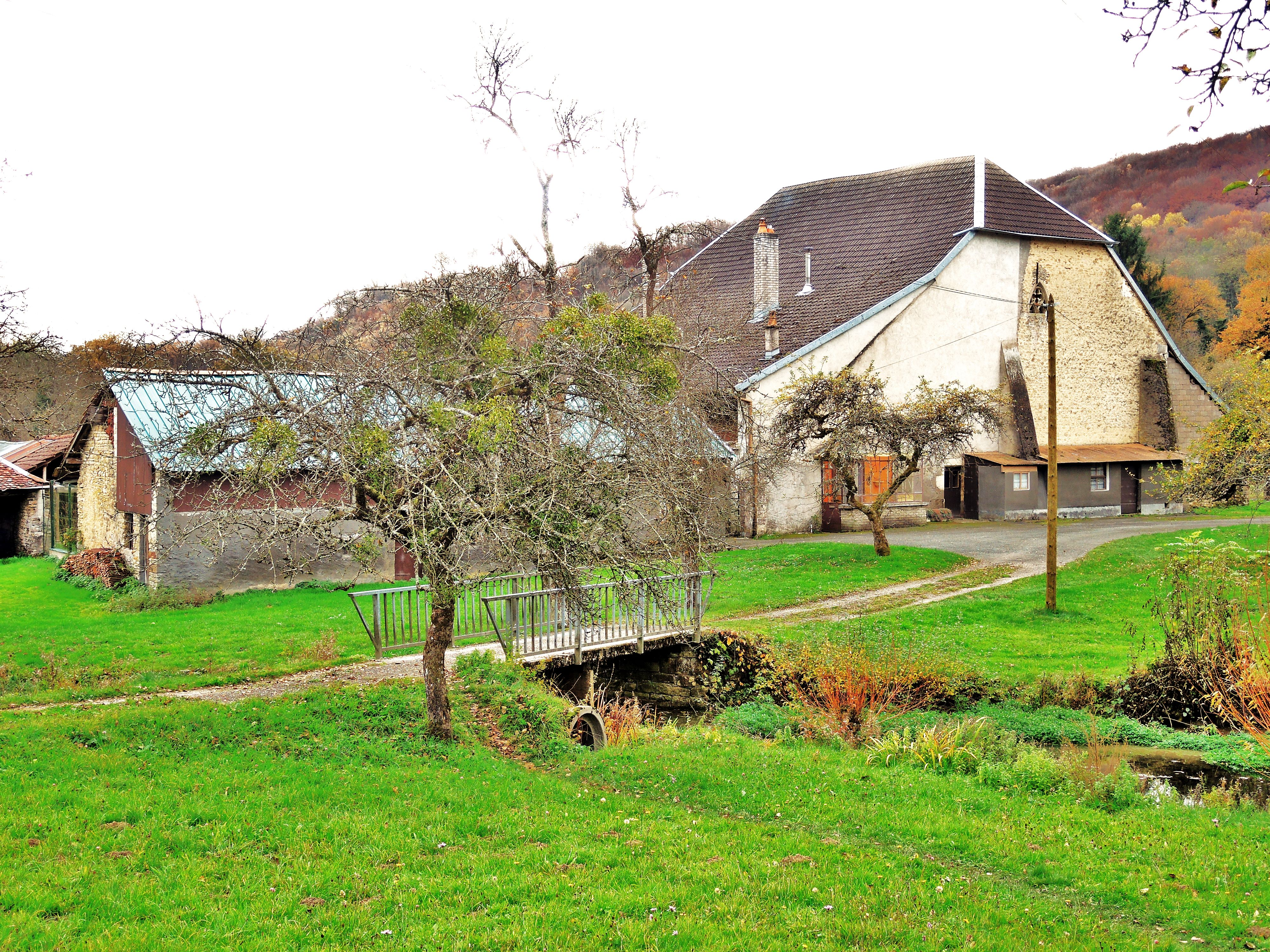
The abbey site in Mancenans

Lieu-Croissant Abbey otherwise Lieucroissant Abbey (French: Abbaye de Lieu-Croissant or de Lieucroissant) was a Cistercian abbey in Mancenans, a commune of Doubs in France. It was first built in 1134 and it was destroyed during the French Revolution in 1791.

Lieucroissant was a daughter house of Lützel Abbey, of the filiation of Morimond. During the Crusades on the way from Milan to Cologne, the relics of the Magi were entrusted to the monks of this abbey, earning it the nickname Abbaye des Trois Rois (Abbey of the Three Kings).
