= Lucelle Abbey =

Abbey in Haut-Rhin, France

Coordinates: 47°25′21″N 7°14′47″E

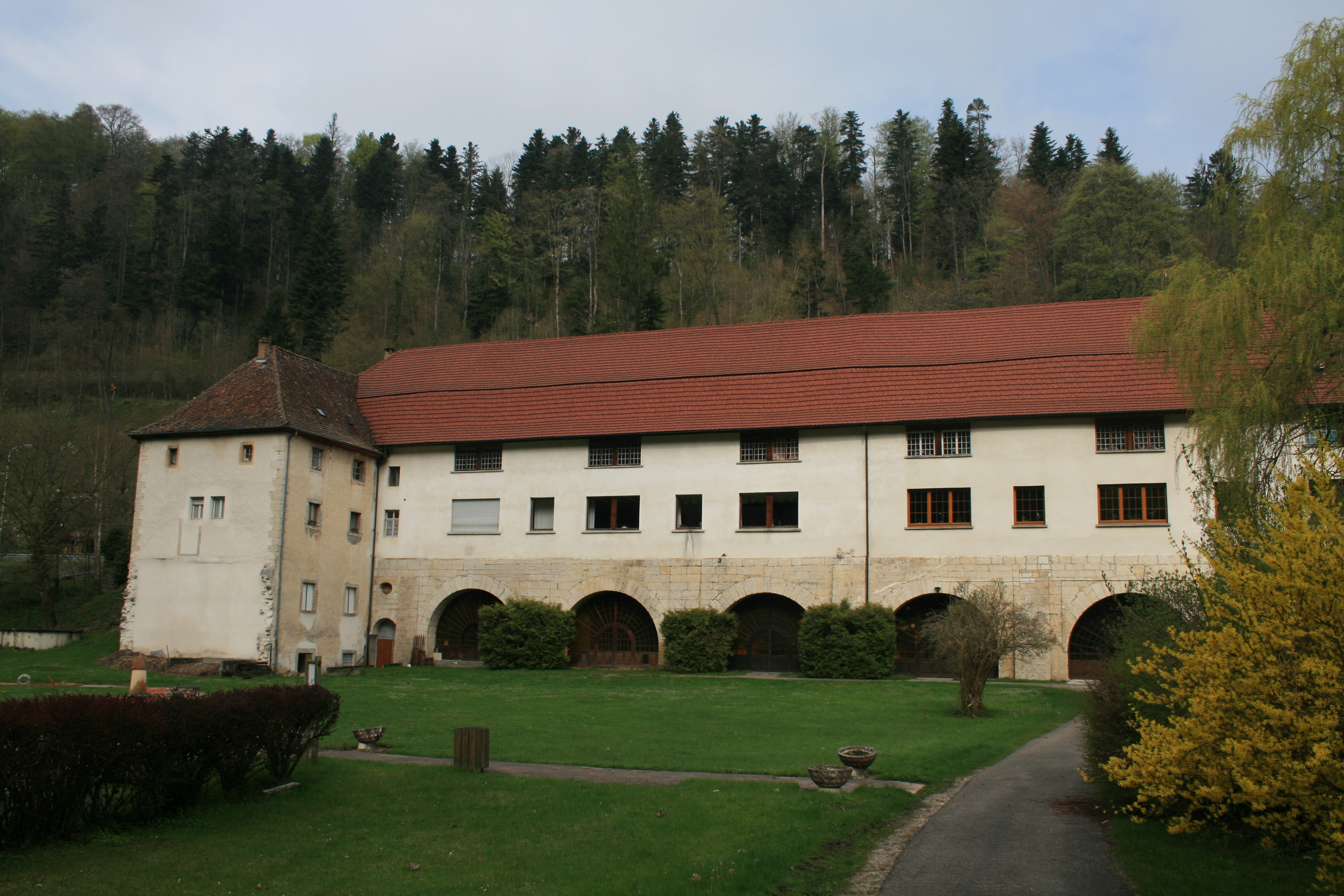
A part of the former abbey

Lucelle Abbey or Lützel Abbey (French: Abbaye de Lucelle; German: Kloster Lützel) was a Cistercian monastery in the present village of Lucelle, in the Haut-Rhin department in Alsace, France, but located right on the Swiss border.

The name of the original foundation was Lucis cella, the "cell of light".

Lucelle was founded in 1124 as a daughter house of Bellevaux Abbey, which in its turn was a daughter house of Morimond Abbey. It was dissolved in 1792 during the French Revolution.

== Daughter houses ==
The following were daughter houses settled from Lucelle:

- Neubourg Abbey (1130/1131)
- Kaisheim Abbey (1133)
- Lieu-Croissant Abbey (1134)
- Salem Abbey (1134/1137 or 1138)
- Frienisberg Abbey (1131/1138)
- Pairis Abbey (1139)
- St. Urban's Abbey (1194)

Lützel Abbey seems also to have founded a small Cistercian nunnery, Kleinlützel Priory in Switzerland, in about 1136–1138, although there is no direct evidence that they did so or that the women's community at Kleinlützel was Cistercian. In 1264 the foundation was given to the Augustinian Canons of Basle. Lützel Abbey regained possession of the premises at the beginning of the 16th century.

== Bibliography ==
- Munch, Gérard (2010), Économie et patrimoine d'un monastère cistercien. Lucelle aux XIIe, XIIIe et XIVe siècles (doctoral thesis, University of Strasbourg, 9 November 2010)
- Claerr-Stamm, Gabrielle (2008), Les riches heures de l'abbaye de Lucelle au temps de Nicolas Delfis 1708-1751, Riedisheim 2008
- Zimmermann, Jean (1999), "L'histoire de Lucelle, une abbaye cistercienne", in: Claerr-Stamm 1999, pp. 9–62
- Claerr-Stamm, Gabrielle et al., Lucelle. Histoire, fouilles, vestiges, Riedisheim, 1999 (11993)
- Kohler, François (1991), "Lucelle", in: Bernard Prongué, Le Canton du Jura de A à Z, Porrentruy 1991
- Chèvre, André (1982), "Cisterciens de Lucelle", in: Helvetia Sacra, Abteilung 3 (Die Orden mit Benediktinerregel), Band 3 (Die Zisterzienser und Zisterzienserinnen […] in der Schweiz), Bern 1982, pp. 290–311, with short biographies of all abbots
- Le Haut-Rhin. Dictionnaire des Communes, 3 Bände, Colmar 1980–1982; Band 2, 1981, subheading "Lucelle", pp. 821–828
- Chèvre, André (1973), Lucelle. Histoire d'une ancienne abbaye cistercienne, Delémont 1973
- Meyer, Werner (1968), Die Löwenburg im Berner Jura. Geschichte der Burg, der Herrschaft und ihrer Bewohner, Basel etc 1968
- Weis-Müller, Renée (1968), "Der Lützelhof in Basel. Gründung der Abtei Lützel und ihre Verbindung zu Basel, Cluny und die Gründung von St. Alban", in: Basler Stadtbuch 1968, pp. 82ff.
- Suratteau, Jean-René (1965), Le Département du Mont-Terrible sous le régime du Directoire (1795–1800), Paris 1965, pp. 326, 336–337 and passim
- Chèvre, André (1964), "Conflits entre les prince-éveques et l'abbaye de Lucelle au XVIIIe siècle", in Festschrift Oskar Vasella, Fribourg 1964, pp. 368–385
- Bienz, Georg and Galluser, Werner A. (1962), "Die Kulturlandschaft des schweizerischen Lützeltals", in: Regio Basiliensis 3, pp. 67–99
- Grenacher, Franz (1962), "Die Löwenburg in der Kartographie des Fürstbistums Basel und auf Plänen der Abtei Lützel", in: Regio Basiliensis 3, pp. 123–137
- Meyer, Werner (1962), "Aus der Geschichte der Herrschaft Löwenburg und ihrer Besitzer", in: Regio Basiliensis 3, pp. 104–113
- Regio Basiliensis, Band 3, Basel 1961/1962: several essays on the Löwenburg, the Lützeltal and Lützel
- Specklin, Robert (1961), "Etudes sur la Jura alsacien", in: Bulletin de la Société d’Histoire et de Sciences Naturelles de Mulhouse, Nr. 10 (1961)
- Stintzi, Paul (1961), "Lützel. Notizen aus der Geschichte der Abtei", in: Annuaire de la Société d’histoire sundgovienne, 1961, pp. 10–56
- Stintzi, Paul (1957), "Die ehemalige Kirche der Zisterzienser-Abtei Lützel", in: Revue d'histoire ecclésiastique suisse 51, 1957, pp. 233–237
