= Mancenans =

- Commune
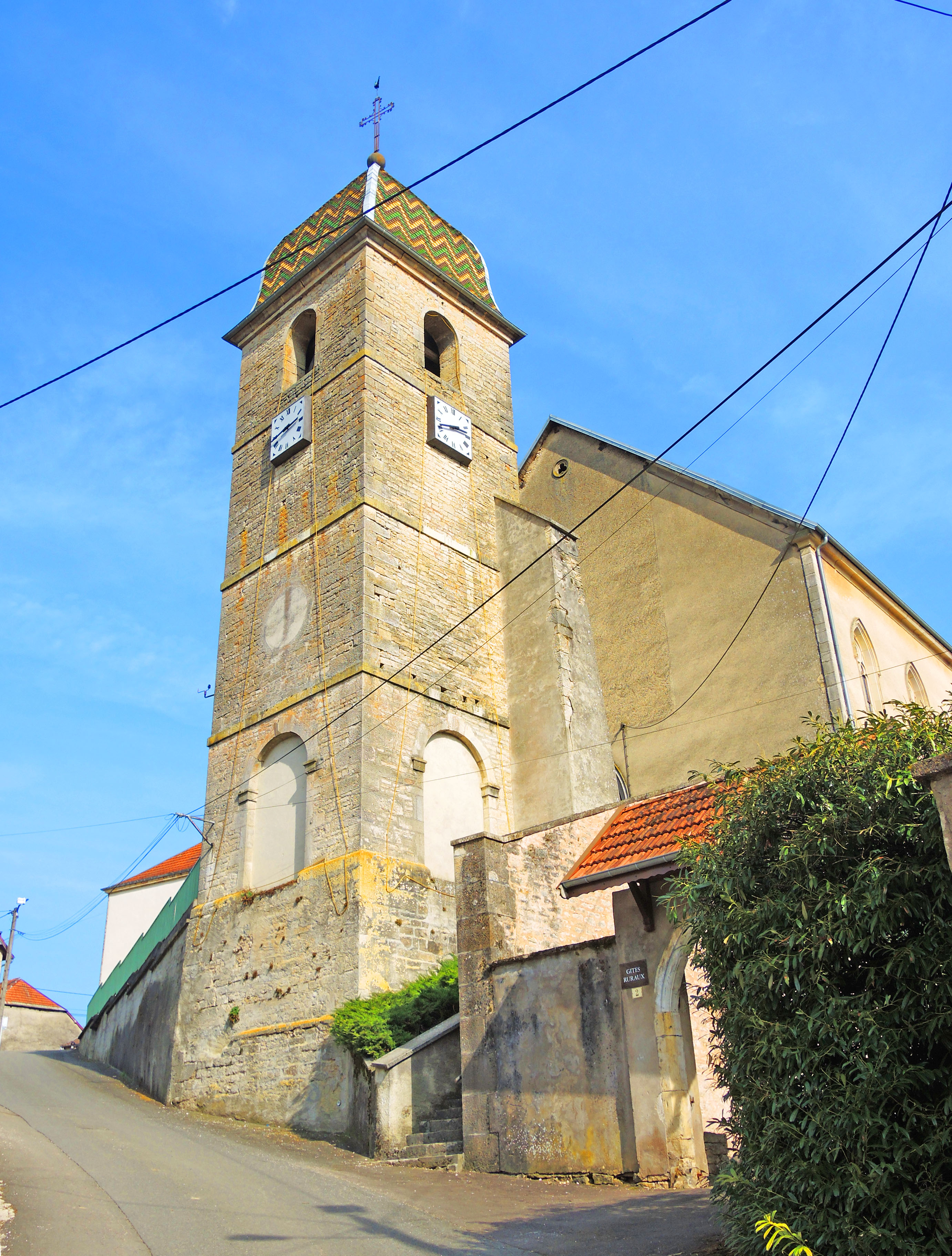
- The church in Mancenans

- Coat of arms
- Location of Mancenans
- Location within France Location within Bourgogne-Franche-Comté
- Coordinates: 47°27′18″N 6°32′37″E
- Country: France
- Region: Bourgogne-Franche-Comté
- Department: Doubs
- Arrondissement: Montbéliard
- Canton: Bavans

Government
  - Mayor (2020–2026): Olivier Perriguey
- Area^{1}: 11.94 km^{2} (4.61 sq mi)
- Highest elevation: 501 m (1,644 ft)
- Lowest elevation: 283 m (928 ft)
- Population (2023): 321
  - Density: 26.9/km^{2} (69.6/sq mi)
- Time zone: UTC+01:00 (CET)
  - Summer (DST): UTC+02:00 (CEST)
- INSEE/Postal code: 25365 /25250
- ^{1} French Land Register data, which excludes lakes, ponds, glaciers > 1 km^{2} (0.386 sq mi or 247 acres) and river estuaries.

Mancenans (French pronunciation: [mɑ̃snɑ̃]) is a commune in the Doubs department in the Bourgogne-Franche-Comté region in eastern France.

== Geography ==
Mancenans lies 4 km (2.5 mi) west of L'Isle-sur-le-Doubs between the hills of Châtel and Replain.

== Population ==
Historical population
Year	Pop.	±% p.a.
1968	255	—
1975	322	+3.39%
1982	350	+1.20%
1990	322	−1.04%
1999	284	−1.39%
2007	346	+2.50%
2012	325	−1.24%
2017	308	−1.07%
2023	321	+0.69%
Source: INSEE

== See also ==
- Communes of the Doubs department
