= Walter Moser (architect) =

Swiss architect (1931–2023)

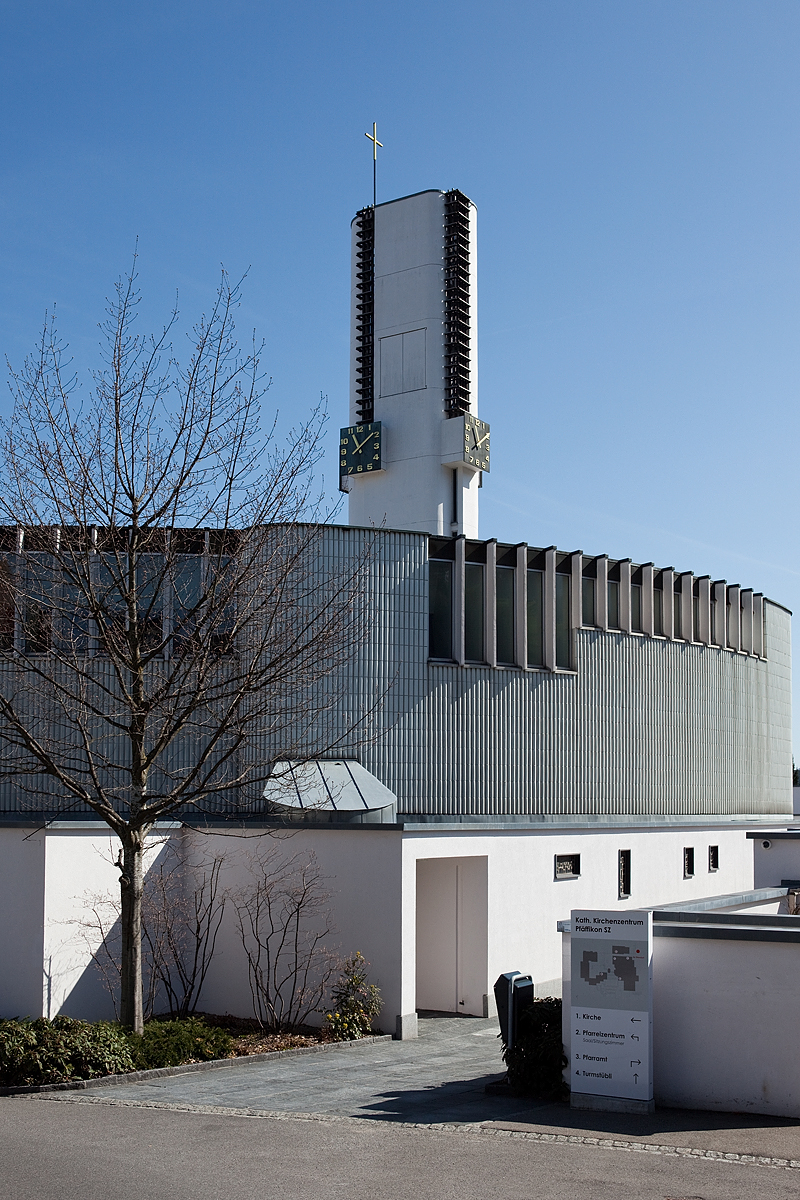
St. Meinrad church, Pfäffikon: 1968

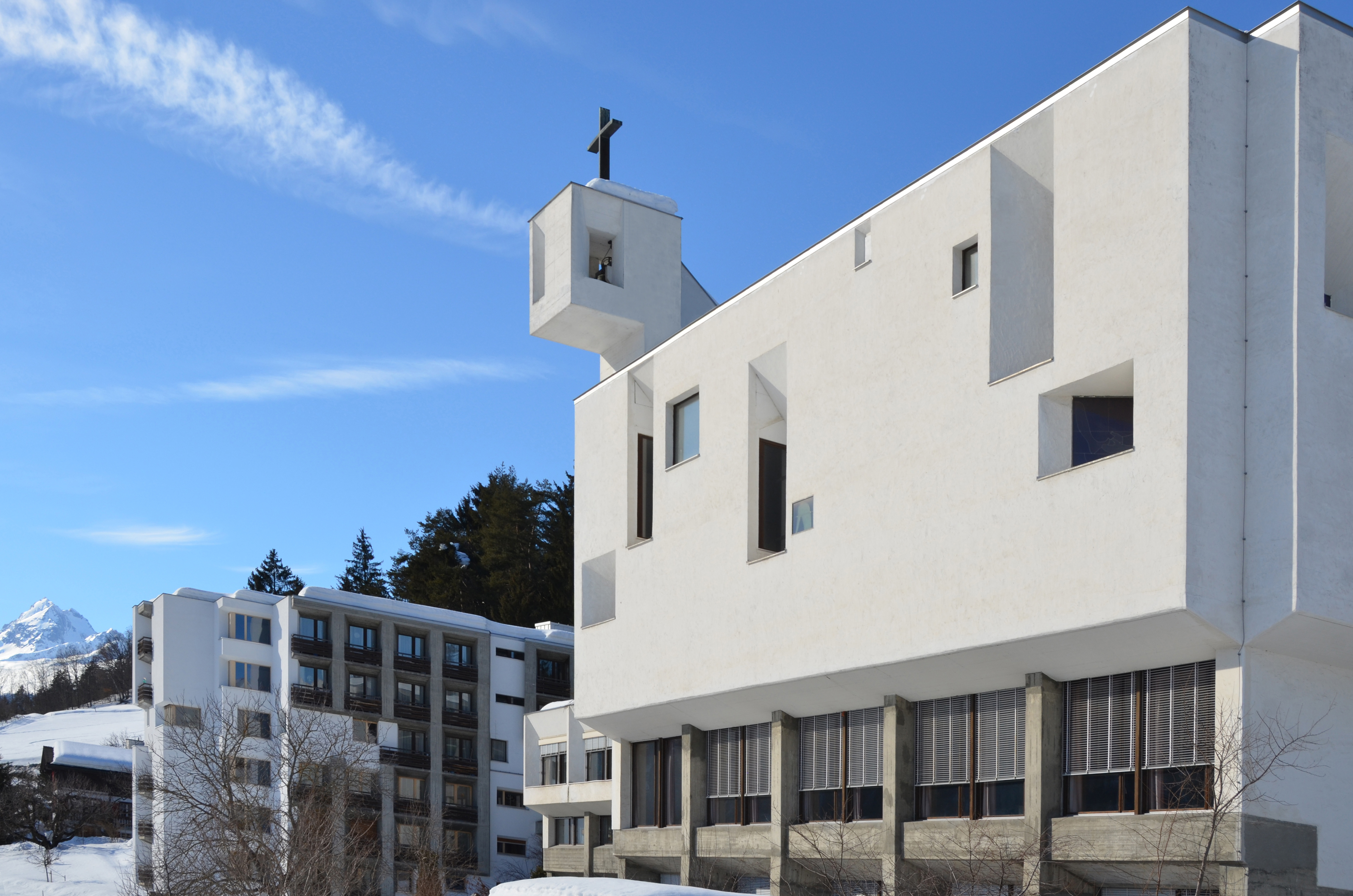
Dominican Convent chapel, Ilanz: 1969-1973

Walter Moser (11 April 1931 – 3 April 2023) was a Swiss architect. From 1960 he worked on sixteen new churches and church complexes in the modern sacral style. Although he was chiefly known for his work for the Roman Catholic church, he also worked on a number of secular public buildings and developments, and carried out many renovation and restoration projects on "historical" churches in German-speaking German speaking central and eastern Switzerland.

== Life and works ==
Walter Moser was born on 11 April 1931 in Schaffhausen, the most northerly of the Swiss cantons. He is the son of one architect and the father of two. His father, Alois Moser (1900–1972), was also responsible for a number of important new Catholic churches, including those in his home town of Würenlos (condemned at the time by locals as "much too modern"), Untersiggenthal and nearby Killwangen.

Moser concluded his schooling at Zürich's Rämibühl Canton School (as it was known at that time), having gained his "matura diploma", which opened the way for university-level education. He moved on to the Federal Institute of Technology (ETH) where he studied Architecture, graduating in 1955. He was part of a vintage cohort at the ETH. One contemporary who became a life-long friend was Theo Senn, a Finnish architecture student, completely fluent not just in Finnish and Swedish, but also in German and French. Armed with his degree, Walter Moser teamed up with his father for a couple of years. They worked together on a completely new church in Langenthal and another at Emmenbrücke (LU).

Between 1958 and 1960, Moser lived in Finland. He worked in Helsinki with Alvar Aalto, who was hugely influential in respect of his own subsequent work. In 1960 Walter Moser returned to Switzerland and set up his own architecture practice in Zürich. He entered a number of architecture competitions which led to a series of commissions for new Catholic churches in German-speaking German speaking Switzerland. Since the 1970s the work on new churches has been complemented by renovation and reconstruction work on important historical and contemporary church buildings.

Some of his most important secular buildings were in the Grünau quarter on the western side of Zürich. The development has subsequently undergone extensive repairs, but the "brutalism" of Moser's 1970s designs has been respected. His contributions include the Grünau retirement home, the school building, the kindergarten and the public swimming pool, which between them set the architectural tone for the overall development.

Moser worked extensively with high-profile visual artists for the embellishment of his buildings. These included Max Rüedi, Herbert Albrecht, Otto Müller and Alfred Huber.

From 1984, Walter Moser was joined at his Zürich architecture practice by his son, Andreas Moser.

Walter Moser died on 3 April 2023, at the age of 91.
