= Kleinlützel Priory =

Kleinlützel Priory was a small religious house at Kleinlützel, a community in the district of Thierstein in the Canton of Solothurn in Switzerland. During the course of its history it housed several different religious communities.

== History ==
The early history of the priory is poorly documented. In about 1136-1138 a small women's religious community, the Minor Lucella, was established. There is no firm evidence that this was a community of Cistercian nuns, but the similarity of names strongly suggests that it was a foundation or dependency of the Cistercian Lützel Abbey (Lucella), which clearly had a connection with the place. The establishment was transferred in 1264 to the Canons Regular of the Priory of St. Leonhard in Basel. In 1486 it became a house of Canonesses Regular, who relocated in 1494 or 1495 to Schwarzenthann, where they remained until their community was suppressed in 1530. The buildings at Kleinlützel suffered serious damage during the Swabian War (1499) and were destroyed in 1525 during the wars of the peasants.

Lützel Abbey seems to have taken possession of the buildings in 1505, and after 1525 to have rebuilt at least some of them, including the chapel which still stands, along with some of the service buildings. The monks of the abbey occupied the priory until 1777, when they abandoned it.

== Sources and external links ==
- Kleinlützel municipal website (in German)
- Review of "Helvetia Sacra" IV/2: Die Augustiner-Chorherren und die Chorfrauen-Gemeinschaften in der Schweiz (in German)
