= Claro Abbey =

Benedictine community of nuns in Switzerland

Coordinates: 46°15′25″N 9°2′10″E

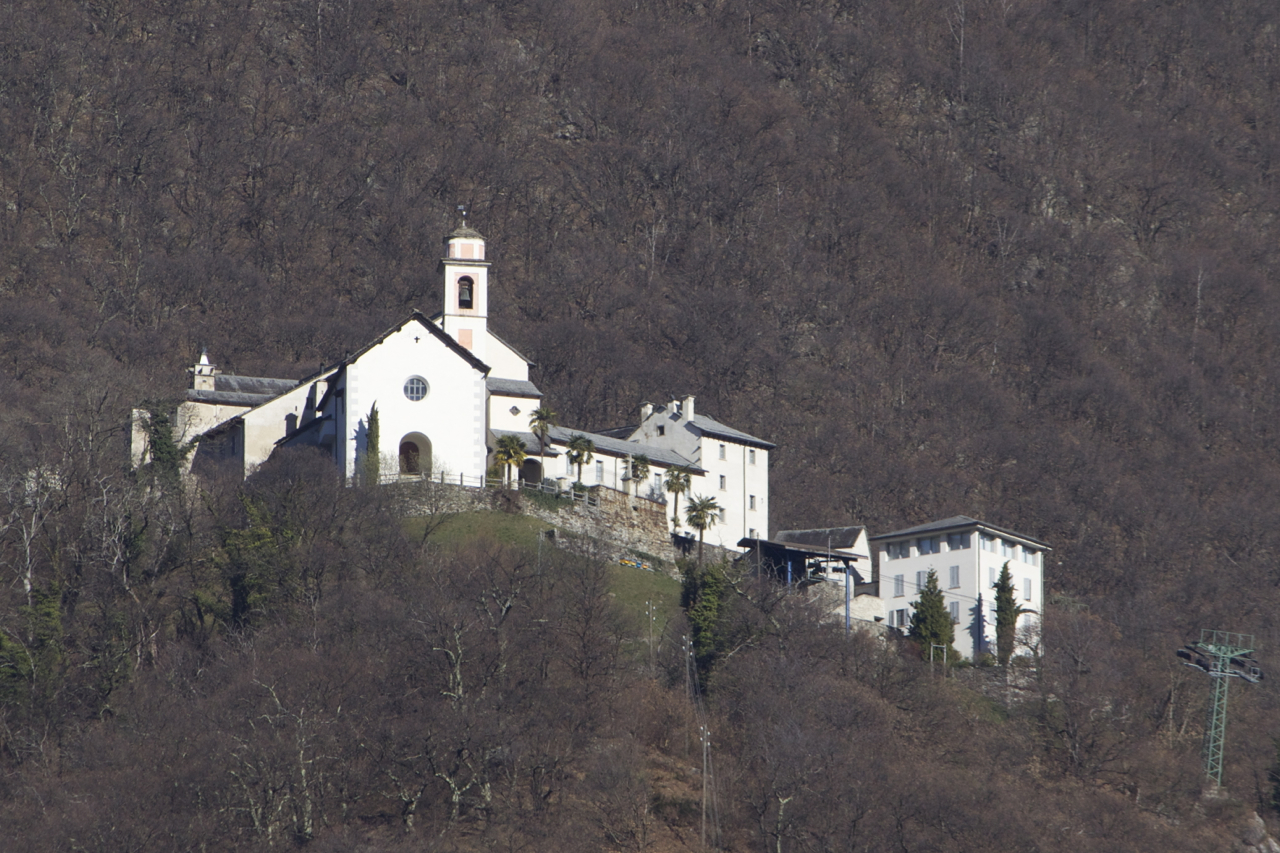
Claro Abbey

Claro Abbey (Italian: Monastero di Santa Maria Assunta supra Claro) is a Benedictine community of nuns, dedicated to the Assumption of the Virgin Mary, situated twenty minutes by foot to the east of the village of Claro in the Canton of Ticino, Switzerland.

== History ==
The abbey was founded in 1490 on the initiative of Scolastica de Vincemalis, a Benedictine religious of Milan who on 13 May 1490 became the establishment's first abbess. The monastery grew rapidly, and by 1516 was home to 16 nuns. In 1559, the religious were charged by decree of Pope Paul IV to relaunch and supervise Seedorf Abbey in the Canton of Uri. Intended for the education of girls, the buildings were enlarged several times during the 17th century, and again in the second half of the 20th century.

The abbey is registered as a cultural asset of regional importance.

== Sources ==
- Website of the Monastero di Claro (in Italian)
- Dizzionario istorico della Svizzera: Claro (in Italian)
